= Trade group efforts against file sharing =

Arts and media industry trade groups, such as the International Federation of the Phonographic Industry (IFPI) and Motion Picture Association of America (MPAA), strongly oppose and attempt to prevent copyright infringement through file sharing. The organizations particularly target the distribution of files via the Internet using peer-to-peer software. Efforts by trade groups to curb such infringement have been unsuccessful with chronic, widespread and rampant infringement continuing largely unabated.

== Rationale ==
The trade groups also claim that widespread copyright infringement on the Internet hurts sales, in turn affecting the artists who depend on royalties. Various economic studies support these claims, but not always to the degree the trade groups report. Other studies show mixed effects, and sometimes overall net social "welfare" benefits.

== Actions against Internet service providers ==
In March 2007, Irish Recorded Music Association (IRMA) members sued Eircom Limited, the largest broadband provider in Ireland, over alleged illegal file sharing by subscribers. IRMA had previously demanded that Eircom install filtering technology or take other steps to block IRMA's copyrighted music from being shared.

In November 2008, a group of 34 film and television studios (including Village Roadshow, Warner Brothers, Sony Pictures, Disney and the Seven Network), represented by the Australian Federation Against Copyright Theft (AFACT) launched action in the Federal Court of Australia against iiNet, Australia's third-largest internet service provider. AFACT alleged that iiNet customers had breached its members' copyright by using peer-to-peer software to share and download films and television programs, and that iiNet had not acted against the alleged file-sharers despite 18 notifications of copyright infringement. The Federal Court found that this was not the case. The case was taken on appeal to the High Court of Australia where it was dismissed unanimously, finding that iiNet "had no direct technical power" to stop users from downloading copyrighted material illegally.

== Actions against file sharing services ==
=== Litigation ===
The RIAA first noticed that Internet sites were offering unauthorized recordings in early 1997, so the organization began sending cease-and-desist letters to the operators of such sites, leading to voluntary shutdowns of some.

In mid-1997, the RIAA took the recording industry's first collective legal action against online file-sharing of music, filing copyright infringement claims against the operators of three U.S.-based MP3 file-sharing sites. Each case could have resulted in a statutory damage award of over $1 million, but all three were settled out-of-court with permanent injunctions in January 1998.

In 1998, the RIAA sued the operators of two more sites, resulting in permanent injunctions and monetary damage awards against the defendants, who were also required to perform community service.

In late 1999, RIAA labels sued Napster for providing a peer-to-peer file sharing network for MP3 files. The plaintiffs claimed that Napster "facilitate[d] piracy of music on an unprecedented scale." Napster became bankrupt during the case; and has since been taken over by Roxio and provides a download service which is sanctioned by the RIAA.

In 2002, the RIAA sued Aimster, which provided a similar service.

In 2003, MPAA studios sued Grokster and other file sharing services in a case that would eventually go to the Supreme Court of the United States. The court held that producers of technology could be held liable for intent to induce infringement.

In 2006, RIAA labels sued the developers of LimeWire, a client for the Gnutella file sharing network.

=== Support of police actions ===
In a controversial May 2006 raid, Swedish National Bureau of Investigation and local police seized the servers of BitTorrent tracker The Pirate Bay, causing a three-day outage. The raid appeared to be motivated by pressure from the Motion Picture Association of America (MPAA), a group that filed police complaints in Stockholm and Gothenborg in 2004 and 2005 against The Pirate Bay and sent a letter to Sweden's state secretary requesting action. The raid was publicized as a success by the MPAA, but ridiculed by The Pirate Bay's operators. The 2006 raid was detailed in the documentary Steal This Film.

In January 2012, the Hong Kong-based file sharing website Megaupload was discovered to be hosted on servers in the state of Virginia, allowing the US government to take action against it. On January 19, the website was shut down and its founder, Kim Dotcom, along with four others involved in the website, were arrested. The indictment issued claims that Megaupload has cost copyright holders $500 million due to its facilitation of illegal downloads. The MPAA requested Carpathia, Megaupload's server host, to retain Megaupload's 25 petabytes of data in case the MPAA decided to sue Megaupload for copyright infringement. While this data includes information on 66.6 million Megaupload users, the MPAA stated that it is not interested in the identities of individual users.

=== Peer-to-peer spoofing ===
The RIAA has apparently in the past been revealed to and may have admitted to the practice of spoofing, deliberately flooding P2P networks with "junk music". A further reference to such activity was discovered when computer software and source code along with emails were stolen from US Company "Media Defender"; their software was designed to facilitate "interdiction" on all the then known peer-to-peer file sharing networks. The contents of the emails made it clear that both P2P network monitoring and interdiction were undertaken by Media Defender.

=== Denial-of-service attacks ===
Aiplex Software, an India-based technology company, revealed in 2010 that it has made denial-of-service attacks on torrent hosting websites on behalf of movie studios. Internet activists retaliated against Aiplex and industry trade groups with denial-of-service attacks of their own, coordinated through Operation Payback.

== Lawsuits against individuals ==
From 2005 through 2008, the Recording Industry Association of America (RIAA) saw lawsuits against individual consumers as a way to combat the problem of Internet-based copyright infringement. RIAA President Cary Sherman claimed that the large number of lawsuits filed has "arrested the growth of a runaway solution that would have grown worse and worse." As of July 2006, the RIAA had brought lawsuits against more than 20,000 people in the United States suspected of distributing copyrighted works. Yet, through 2008, album sales continued to decline from their 1999 peak.

=== Participating plaintiffs ===
The RIAA has brought file sharing lawsuits against individuals naming the following plaintiffs.

- EMI labels: Capitol Records, Priority Records, Virgin Records
- Sony BMG labels: Arista Records, Bertelsmann Music Group, LaFace Records, Sony Records, Zomba Label Group
- Universal Music Group labels: Interscope Records, Loud Records, Motown Records
- Univision labels: Fonovisa Records
- Warner Music Group labels: Atlantic Records, Elektra Records, Lava Records, London-Sire Records, Maverick Records, Warner Bros. Records

The MPAA has brought file sharing lawsuits against individuals naming the following plaintiffs.

- Lions Gate Entertainment
- News Corporation studios: 20th Century Fox
- Paramount Pictures
- Sony Pictures studios: Columbia Pictures, Metro-Goldwyn-Mayer, Screen Gems
- Time Warner studios: New Line Cinema, Warner Bros.
- Universal Studios
- The Walt Disney Company

=== Scope of distribution rights ===
A critical case, which may not only determine the fate of the RIAA's litigation campaign, but also impact the scope of copyright across the internet, is Elektra v. Barker. In that case, Tenise Barker, a 29-year-old nursing student in the Bronx, moved to dismiss the RIAA's complaint for lack of specificity, and on the ground that merely "making available" does not constitute a copyright infringement. In opposing Ms. Barker's motion, the RIAA argued that "making available" is indeed a copyright infringement. Upon learning of the RIAA's argument, which sought to expand copyright law, the Computer & Communications Industry Association, the U.S. Internet Industry Association, and the Electronic Frontier Foundation (EFF) submitted amicus curiae briefs supporting Ms. Barker's motion and rebutting the RIAA's argument. The Motion Picture Association of America, in turn, submitted a brief supporting the RIAA. The U.S. Department of Justice submitted a "Statement of Interest" refuting one argument made by the EFF, but taking no position on the "making available" issue; the DOJ stated that it has never prosecuted anyone for "making available". The case was argued before Judge Kenneth M. Karas in Manhattan federal court on January 26, 2007. The same issue has been briefed in a more recent case, Warner v. Cassin. In March 2008, Judge Karas ruled in "Barker" that simply "making available" (such as dropping a file in a shared folder) did not constitute copyright infringement.

=== Amnesty programs ===
Between September 2003 and April 2004, the RIAA, through its Clean Slate Program, offered individual file sharers amnesty for past infringements, "on the condition that they refrain from future infringement", and delete the infringing material. Individuals were no longer eligible for amnesty once they had been sued. The program is now discontinued.

The RIAA states this was an educational initiative about illegal file sharing, and was stopped due to increased public awareness in the issues. The program may also have been stopped due to the low number of takers.

There is some doubt about whether the RIAA can offer this protection, with some attorneys claiming the offer of amnesty was misleading, and legal documents provided by the RIAA "provides ... no promise not to sue you."

A lawsuit brought in California state court, Parke v. RIAA, alleged the RIAA had committed fraudulent business practices by offering the program.

=== Collection of evidence ===
The RIAA and MPAA contracted MediaSentry, on behalf of plaintiff labels and studios, to collect information about IP addresses sharing potentially infringing files on peer-to-peer networks. Collected information included lists of potentially infringing files an IP address reports as available for downloading, files actually downloaded by MediaSentry from an IP address, and dates and times of the observations.

In the United States, MediaSentry is not licensed as a private investigator in some of the states in which observed files are physically located. Because of this, beginning in February 2008, some defendants have challenged the legality of MediaSentry's practices, by seeking to exclude evidence collected by MediaSentry from the lawsuits, and by filing complaints with state licensing boards.

The RIAA asserted that MediaSentry is not a private investigator, so does not require licensing in any jurisdiction. Nevertheless, sometime in 2008 the RIAA quietly discontinued using MediaSentry's services. A February 2008 redesign of MediaSentry's website removed a section on "litigation support services" which described "gathering evidence for civil/criminal litigation and prosecution".

=== Early settlement offers ===
In February, 2007, the RIAA launched an 'early settlement program' directed to ISP's and to colleges and universities, urging them to pass along letters to subscribers and students offering early "settlements", prior to the disclosure of their identities. When accepted, these offers can save the RIAA the expense to procure the identities through a Doe lawsuit naming multiple defendants.

The settlement letters urged ISP's to preserve evidence for the benefit of the RIAA and invited the students and subscribers to visit an RIAA website for the purpose of entering into a "discount settlement" payable by credit card. By March 2007, the focus had shifted from ISP's to colleges and universities.

The average settlement amount offered by the RIAA is around $3,000, but it depends on the number of infringements In one case in 2008, 18 UC Berkeley students were informed by the RIAA's lawfirm that they were infringing on copyrights through the use of Limewire. They were offered a settlement of $750 per song in order to avoid legal action.

=== Identification of defendants ===
Between 2002 and 2003, the RIAA attempted to get Verizon to disclose the identities of file-sharing customers based on a simple one-page subpoena. Verizon attorney Sarah Deutsch challenged the subpoena's validity on procedural and privacy grounds. In December 2003, this failed when a federal appeals court overturned a lower court order. The RIAA claims this procedure was sanctioned by the Digital Millennium Copyright Act, but the appeals court ruled that the DMCA regulation applies only to data actually hosted by an Internet service provider, rather than data on a customer's computer. The United States Supreme Court declined to review this ruling in 2004. As a result, the RIAA must now file individual civil suits against each accused file-sharer, and the ISP and alleged file-sharer have more legal avenues for preventing disclosure of their identity, making the entire process much more expensive, slow and complicated. The court opinion was written by Judge Douglas Ginsburg. The RIAA typically files suits against multiple Does.

The RIAA names defendants based on ISP identification of the subscriber associated with an IP address, and as such do not know any additional information about a person before they sue. After an Internet subscriber's identity is discovered, but before an individual lawsuit is filed, the subscriber is typically offered an opportunity to settle. The standard settlement is a payment of several thousand dollars to the RIAA, and an agreement not to engage in file-sharing of RIAA music.

The Electronic Frontier Foundation, American Civil Liberties Union and Public Citizen oppose the ability of the RIAA and other companies to "strip Internet users of anonymity without allowing them to challenge the order in court".

The RIAA's methods of identifying individual users have led to the issuing of subpoenas to a dead grandmother, an elderly computer novice, and even those without any computer at all. The RIAA has also brought lawsuits against children, some as young as 12.

The RIAA looks to various colleges and universities throughout the United States as some of the biggest offenders of peer to peer file sharing. It has found California colleges and universities to have received the most pre-litigation letters and copyright infringement notices.

In 2005, Patricia Santangelo made the news by challenging the RIAA's lawsuit against her. While she succeeded in getting the lawsuit against her dismissed two years later, her children were then sued. A default judgment entered against her daughter Michelle for $30,750 for failing to respond to the lawsuit, was subsequently vacated.

=== Counterclaims ===
Another defendant, Tanya Andersen, a disabled 41-year-old single mother living in Oregon, filed counterclaims against the RIAA including a RICO charge. The RIAA requested deposition of her 10-year-old daughter. Subsequently, on July 4, 2007, the RIAA dropped the case, leaving open only the question of attorneys fees and the RIAA's liability under Ms. Andersen's counterclaims. Thereafter, Ms. Andersen sued the RIAA, the record company plaintiffs, Safenet (MediaSentry), and Settlement Support Center LLC, for a huge list of accusations including fraud and negligent misrepresentation, violations of ORICO, abuse of legal process and malicious prosecution subsequently amending her complaint to turn the case into a class action.

In Texas, July 2007, Rhonda Crain (Sony v. Crain) sought leave to add a counterclaim against the RIAA for knowingly engaging in "one or more overt acts of unlawful private investigation" in the RIAA case against Crain.

In one file-sharing case, the RIAA has been referred by the defendants as "a cartel acting collusively in violation of the antitrust laws and of public policy, by tying their copyrights to each other, collusively litigating and settling all cases together, and by entering into an unlawful agreement among themselves to prosecute and to dispose of all cases in accordance with a uniform agreement, and through common lawyers, thus overreaching the bounds and scope of whatever copyrights they might have". In Arista v. Limewire this was as well alleged by the defendants and referred to in the defendants counterclaim.

See, e.g. UMG v. Lindor, where the RIAA has moved to "strike" those accusations. The motion to strike the charges is pending, and was scheduled to be taken under consideration by the Court on October 2, 2007. See also Arista vs. Limewire for a detailed overview.

In February 2008 it was alleged by a group of artist managers & lawyers that the RIAA has been withholding settlements from artists for several years. The RIAA gained the money through lawsuits claiming to defend the rights of artists, although none of the artists whose music was 'illegally' downloaded reportedly received any of the settlement money.

In September 2008, Charles Nesson filed a counterclaim on behalf of Joel Tenenbaum for abuse of process, claiming "ulterior purposes" of intimidation of other users.

=== Determination of damages ===
By US Copyright Law, between $750 and $30,000 in damages can be sought for copyright infringement. The RIAA typically seeks $750 per song file in statutory damages.

In UMG v. Lindor, the defendant argued that the RIAA's damage theory was unconstitutional because it sought 1071 times the actual cost per track in online stores ($.70). After a Brooklyn Federal Court judge upheld the legal theory behind the RIAA's assessment of damages in November 2006, UMG dropped the lawsuit.

In 2008, federal judge Xavier Rodriguez ruled that teenager Whitney Harper would only have to pay $200 in damages per song that she shared on the KaZaA network, instead of the $750 per song that the RIAA was seeking. Since KaZaa did not expressly inform Harper that her actions were illegal, Rodriguez determined that she had unknowingly committed copyright infringement.

In Capitol v. Thomas, a Minnesota mother was ordered to pay $222,000 ($9,250 per song) in damages to the RIAA for illegally sharing 24 songs on Kazaa. Before they first sued, the RIAA offered a settlement of $5,000, which Thomas refused. After three trials and multiple appeals, at one point of which statutory damages awarded were $1,920,000, the Supreme Court refused to hear Thomas's case in March 2013. Thomas maintains that it will be impossible for the RIAA to collect the $222,000 fee due to her inability to pay.

=== Awarding of costs to prevailing parties ===
In 2006, the Electronic Frontier Foundation, the American Civil Liberties Union, Public Citizen, the ACLU of Oklahoma Foundation, and the American Association of Law Libraries submitted an amicus curiae brief in support of the motion for attorneys fees that has been made by Deborah Foster in Capitol Records v. Debbie Foster, in federal court in Oklahoma, requesting that attorney's fees be awarded to the defendant and alleging a pattern of inadequate investigation and abusive legal practices by the RIAA. The RIAA asked the Court not to accept the amicus curiae brief, claiming that the "Movants attempt to paint a false picture of Plaintiffs and the recording industry run amok". On February 6, 2007, the attorney's fee motion was granted. On July 16, 2007, the Court ordered the RIAA to pay Ms. Foster $68,685.23 in attorneys fees.

In an Oklahoma case, Capitol Records v. Deborah Foster, the RIAA was forced to dismiss a case after a woman filed a motion for leave to make a motion for summary judgment and attorneys fees, stating that she had nothing to do with file sharing and that her only nexus to the case was that she had paid for internet access. The judge ruled that the RIAA's withdrawal of the case—after one and a half years of litigation—did not immunize it from possible liability for attorneys fees, holding that the defendant was a "prevailing party" under the Copyright Act. The Court subsequently ruled that defendant was entitled to be reimbursed for her reasonable attorneys fees, since the RIAA's pursuit of its case was, at best, "marginal", and was being pursued to extract a settlement from someone who was clearly known not to be the direct infringer. The Court noted that the mere fact that Ms. Foster was a person who paid for an internet access account was not a basis for a copyright infringement lawsuit against her. Ms. Foster's motion for attorneys fees had been supported by an amicus curiae brief of the American Civil Liberties Union, Public Citizen, the Electronic Frontier Foundation, the American Association of Law Libraries, and ACLU Foundation of Oklahoma.

Other instances in which the RIAA was known to have been forced to back out of a case to avoid a loss, are Priority Records v. Brittany Chan in Michigan, Virgin Records v. Tammie Marson in California, and Elektra v. Wilke in Illinois.

=== End of mass lawsuits ===
Hilary Rosen was the RIAA's president and chief executive officer from 1998 to 2003 and under her leadership, the company commenced a legal campaign to reduce illegal file-sharing. Rosen has expressed "concern that the lawsuits have outlived most of their usefulness" and that music devices should try "to work better together."

In December 2008 the Wall Street Journal reported that the RIAA had dropped its program of mass lawsuits in favor of cooperative enforcement agreements with a number of ISPs. The RIAA still reserves the right to file lawsuits against 'particularly flagrant' offenders, but the article predicted these lawsuits would "slow to a trickle."

The RIAA has stated on their website that the intention of the lawsuit program was to bring awareness to the illegality of file-sharing. Although there is evidence that the lawsuit program has reduced the amount of files offered by large file-sharers, one source stated in 2006 that there was a limited effect on those who offer less than 1000 files. Overall, the lawsuits have had a negligible effect on the availability of files at any random time.

== Public relations campaigns ==
Trade groups have conducted various public relations campaigns targeting consumer file sharing:

- The MPAA's "Respect Copyrights" campaigns, including the "Who Makes Movies?" and "You can click, but you can't hide" sub-campaigns.
- The RIAA's "Soundbyting" campaign.
- Access Copyright's "Captain Copyright" campaign in Canada.
- The Business Software Alliance's "Define The Line" campaign.
- The Federation Against Software Theft's "Piracy is theft" campaign in the UK.

== Criticism ==
There is much criticism of the RIAA's policy and method of suing individuals for copyright infringement, notably with Internet-based advocacy groups such as the Electronic Frontier Foundation and Students for Free Culture. To date, the RIAA has sued more than 20,000 people in the United States suspected of distributing copyrighted works and settled approximately 2,500 of the cases. Brad Templeton of the Electronic Frontier Foundation has called these types of lawsuits spamigation and implied they are done merely to intimidate people.

The RIAA was criticized in the media after they subpoenaed Gertrude Walton, an 83-year-old woman who died in December 2004. Walton was accused of swapping rock, pop and rap songs. RIAA spokesman Jonathan Lamy commented that legal proceedings had commenced before Walton died. "Our evidence gathering and our subsequent legal actions all were initiated weeks and even months ago."

In a Brooklyn case, Elektra v. Schwartz, against RaeJ Schwartz, a Queens woman with multiple sclerosis, the RIAA's lawyers wrote to the judge that they were in possession of a letter in which "...America Online, Inc., has confirmed that defendant was the owner of the internet access account through which hundreds of plaintiffs' sound recordings were downloaded and distributed to the public without plaintiffs' consent." After the defense received a copy of the letter, it turned out that the letter merely identified Ms. Schwartz as the owner of an internet access account and said nothing at all about "downloading" or "distributing".

The RIAA has also been criticized for bringing lawsuits against children, including 12-year-old Brianna LaHara of New York City in 2003 and 13-year-old Brittany Chan of Michigan. Under the threat of a possible defendant's motion for summary judgment and attorneys fees, the RIAA withdrew the case Priority Records v. Chan. while LaHara's mother agreed to pay $2,000 in settlements.

The RIAA's recent targeting of students has generated controversy as well. An April 4, 2006 story in the MIT campus newspaper The Tech indicates that an RIAA representative stated to Cassi Hunt, an alleged file-sharer, that previously, "the RIAA has been known to suggest that students drop out of college or go to community college in order to be able to afford settlements."

The RIAA has also filed a lawsuit against a woman who has never bought, turned on, or used a personal computer for using an "online distribution system" to obtain unlicensed music files. This occurred again in the Walls case;

"I don't understand this", said James Walls, "How can they sue us when we don't even have a computer?"

The RIAA filed a lawsuit against Larry Scantlebury, a man who had died. They offered the deceased man's family a period of sixty days to grieve the death before they began to depose members of Mr. Scantlebury's family for the suit against his estate.

An academic study by Depoorter et al. (2011) among American and European college students found that users of file-sharing technologies were relatively anti-copyright and that copyright enforcement efforts generated backlash, hardening pro-file sharing beliefs among users of these technologies.

== See also ==
- Graduated response
- Legal issues with BitTorrent
- Odex's actions against file-sharing
- Open Music Model
- Torrent poisoning
- Virtual private network
- Warez
- Internet vigilantism
