= ABC iview =

Video-on-demand service

- Website type: Video on demand; Catch-up TV; Internet television
- Available in: English
- Headquarters: Brisbane, Queensland, {{{location_country}}}
- Area served: Australia
- Owner: Australian Broadcasting Corporation
- Services: streaming service
- Website: www.iview.abc.net.au
- Registration: Optional for livestreams required for on demand
- Launched: 28 July 2008; 18 years ago
- Current status: Active

ABC iview is a video-on-demand and catch-up TV service run by the Australian Broadcasting Corporation. Currently iview video content can only be viewed by users in Australia. As of 2016, ABC iview attracts around 50 million plays monthly and accounts for around half of the total time streamed by Australian TV video services. The service was commissioned by head of multiplatform Dan Fill working for the director of television Kim Dalton and in collaboration with director of innovation Ian Carroll. ABC iview's incredible success has grown over the years: in 2025, it was the number one reaching screen network service in Australia, with an average 12.34 million viewers per week.

== History ==
After running for several months in beta form under the name "ABC Playback", the service became available as a Flash website in July 2008. This was the next step after the video podcasting of ABC TV programs since July 2006.

The iview Flash website was redesigned in 2009 and 2010, to cater for a large increase in content.

An iOS app for iPads was launched in December 2010, followed by a mobile version for iPhone in June 2012. An iview Android app supporting phones and tablets on Android 4.0.3 and above was released on 18 December 2013.

Over the following years, iview was released to a range of smart TVs, games consoles and other devices.

== Content and programming ==
ABC iview provides on-demand access to almost all the TV programs that are broadcast on the ABC's linear broadcast channels (ABC TV, ABC Family, ABC Kids, ABC Entertains, ABC News), as well as simulcast live streams of those channels and original content and programs acquired exclusively for ABC iview.

Programs are categorised by these genres:

- Arts
- Culture
- Comedy
- Documentary
- Drama
- Kids
- Lifestyle
- News and current affairs
- Panel and discussion
- Regional Australia
- Sport

In September 2015, the ABC added a dedicated Arts channel to iview.

Some shows premiere on iview before they feature on broadcast television, such as Rake and the BBC's Class.

=== Live streams ===
- In late 2010, a live stream of ABC News was made available on the iview website, and then subsequently on iOS and Android apps.
- On 1 December 2015, a simulcast live stream of the main ABC TV channel was added to the iview website, iOS and Android apps.
- On 18 July 2016, the ABC added simulcast live streams for all the remaining broadcast channels (ABC Family/ABC Kids, ABC Entertains).
- On 1 May 2018, the ABC added state-based streams (VIC, QLD, TAS, NT, NSW, WA, SA, ACT) of ABC main channel.

== Devices and access ==
=== Website ===
The iview website streams video at up to 4,500 Kbps using HTML5-based technology.

=== Mobile devices ===
- Apple iPad (from 2010)
- Apple iPhone and iPod Touch (from 2012)
- Android phones and tablets on Android v5.0 and above (from 2019)

=== Smart TVs ===
- Sony Bravia
- Samsung Smart TVs ("Orsay") (from 2011) and Samsung Tizen OS (from 2015)
- Panasonic Viera Cast (from 2011)
- LG Netcast (from 2011) & WebOS (from 2014)
- FreeviewPlus certified (HbbTV) devices (from 2014)
- Hisense Smart TVs (from February 2020)

=== Video game consoles ===
- Microsoft Xbox 360 (2011–2018)
- Microsoft Xbox One (from 2015)
- Microsoft Xbox Series X/S (from 2020)
- Sony PlayStation 3 (from 2008)
- Sony PlayStation 4 (from 2015)

=== Media streamers ===
- Foxtel IQ (from 2019)
- Apple TV 4th generation and later (from March 2016)
- Telstra TV (from December 2015)
- Fetch TV (from 2013)
- Chromecast devices

=== Offline viewing ===
Unlike the ABC's podcasts, programmes on the iview service are not officially downloadable and are only available to watch for a short time after the program has aired on the ABC.

In 2012, the ABC sent a legal notice to the author of an open-source program called Python-iView which enabled users to download videos from the ABC. Other download tools such as youtube-dl continue to claim support for unofficially downloading from the site.

=== Unmetering ===
In late 2008, the iview website video player was updated to allow for unmetering (zero-rating) by several Australian ISPs through network peering arrangements. The ISPs included Internode, iPrimus, Westnet, Apex Internet and Adam Internet. iiNet was able to offer iview unmetered without the peering upgrade. In addition, AARNet, Cinenet and Comcen since offer unmetered access to iview. ABC TV live streams and content not streamed using Adobe Flash (i.e. through the iPad and Internet connected TVs) is currently not unmetered; however, this may change in the future.

In October 2016, Optus added ABC iview to their zero-rating offer for Optus mobile customers.

== See also ==
- Internet television in Australia
- List of streaming media services
