= TPG (internet service provider) =

Australian internet service provider

- Formerly: Total Peripherals Group
- Type: Subsidiary
- Industry: Telecommunications
- Founded: 1986; 40 years ago
- Headquarters: Barangaroo, New South Wales, Australia
- Area served: Australia
- Services: Internet service provider Online television
- Revenue: ▲A$2.495 billion (2014)
- Operating income: ▲A$890 million (2018)
- Net income: ▲A$396 million (2018)
- Total assets: ▲A$832.4 million (2014)
- Total equity: ▲A$832 million (2014)
- Number of employees: 5,083 (July 2016)
- Parent: TPG Telecom
- Website: tpg.com.au

TPG is an Australian internet service provider that specialises in consumer and business internet services as well as mobile telephone services. As of August 2015, TPG is the second-largest internet service provider in Australia and is the largest mobile virtual network operator. As such, it has over 671,000 ADSL2+ subscribers, 358,000 landline subscribers and 360,000 mobile subscribers, and owns the second-largest ADSL2+ network in Australia, consisting of 391 ADSL2+ DSLAMs. It also operates in New Zealand.

The company was formed from the merger between Total Peripherals Group, which was established in 1986 by David and Vicky Teoh, and SP Telemedia in 2008. In August 2018, TPG and Vodafone Hutchison Australia announced their intention to merge, with TPG holding a 49.9% stake in the merged company. In February 2020, the Federal Court of Australia decided against an objection by the Australian Competition & Consumer Commission opposing that merger. On 13 July 2020, Vodafone Hutchison Australia merged with TPG via a scheme of arrangement. TPG was renamed to TPG Corporation Limited and delisted from Australian Securities Exchange, with Vodafone Hutchison taking on the TPG Telecom name.

TPG provide five ranges of products and services including Internet access, networking, OEM services, mobile phone service and accounting software.

== History ==
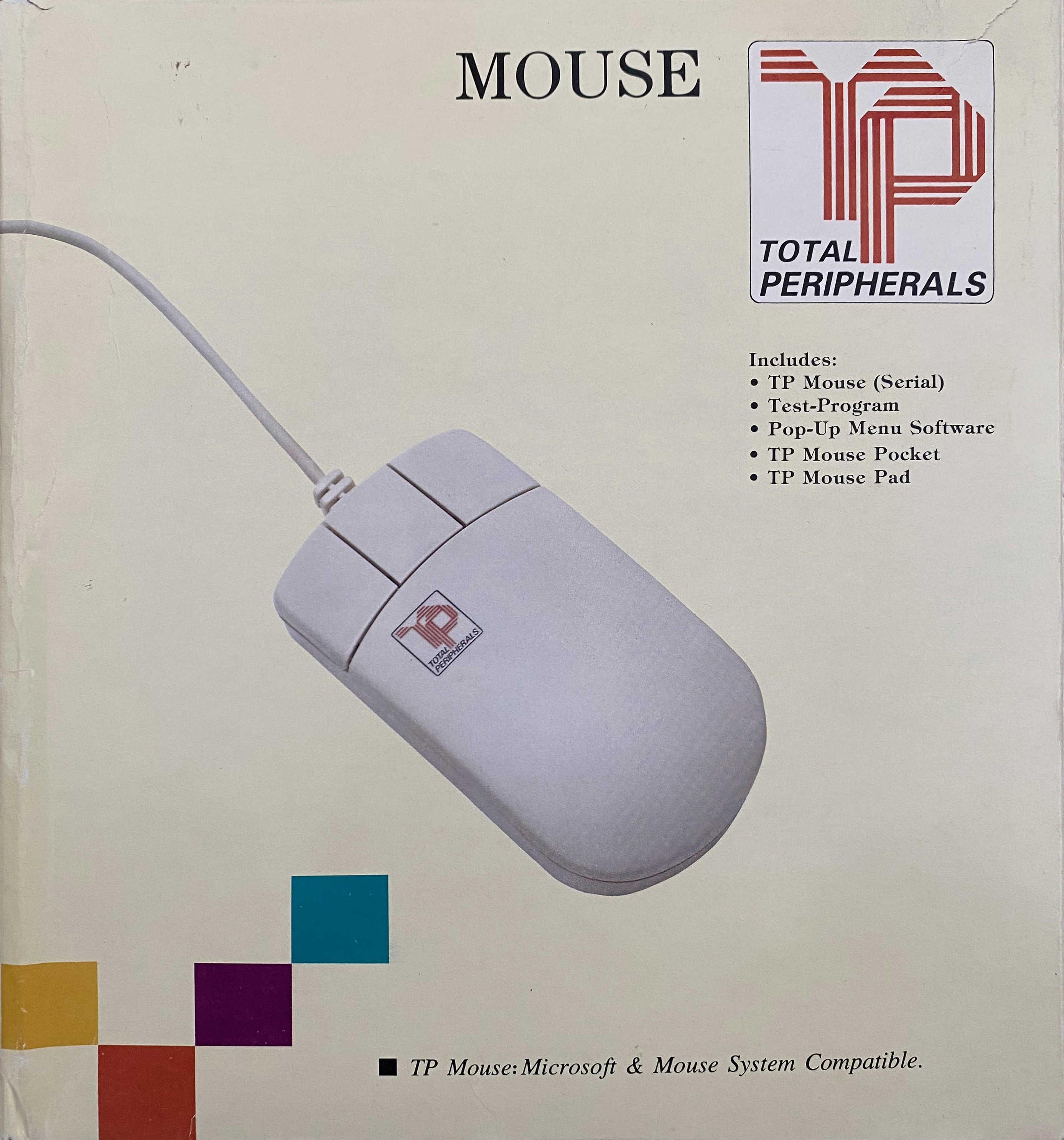
One of Total Peripherals Group's early products

Total Peripherals Group was established in 1986 by Malaysian-born Australian businessman David Teoh, as an IT company that sold OEM computers and later moved to provide internet and mobile telephone services.

In 2007, TPG took a 70 per cent controlling interest in then struggling Adelaide internet provider Chariot. David Teoh shored up TPG's role as Chariot's parent company a year later, in April 2008, and then quickly followed up with the $225 million reverse takeover of SP Telemedia to bring Soul, Chariot and TPG under the one banner.

Soul Converged Communications, formally known as Comindico, was an Australian telecommunications company based in Sydney. Soul's main activities revolve around telecommunications, with business and home and small business divisions. In April 2005, it bought a 43 per cent stake in mobile phone company B Digital. In September 2006 Soul increased its stake in B Digital to 75 per cent and made a full takeover offer.

In April 2008, SPT merged with Total Peripherals Group at a cost of $150 million in cash and $230 million in shares (approximately 80 million) with TPG owner David Teoh becoming the largest shareholder and Executive Chairman of the combined group. On 25 November 2009, following shareholder approval, SP Telemedia Ltd (Trading as Soul) changed its name to TPG Telecom Ltd. The ASX code was changed also from SOT to TPM.

In November 2025, TPG encountered an outage with their services in which a customer died as a result of not being able to call emergency services. TPG cited outdated software as a reason the outage occurred.

=== Post-merger acquisitions ===
In November 2009, TPG, which already owned a substantial portion of PIPE Networks' shares, announced it intended to acquire the company. TPG completed its acquisition of PIPE for $373 million by way of scheme of arrangement on 31 March 2010, after shareholders and government bodies approved the transaction. The acquisition allows TPG to gain full control of PIPE Networks' fibre optic network in Australia and the Pipe Pacific Cable (PPC-1), connecting Sydney to Guam.

TPG, in a statement released on 14 July 2011, announced it intended to acquire IntraPower for $12.8 million. It was also stated in the statement that the Board of Directors of IntraPower recommended the shareholders of the company approve the transaction. The acquisition was completed on 30 August, allowing TPG to benefit from TrustedCloud and other IntraPower products.

On 9 December 2013, TPG purchased AAPT from Telecom New Zealand for $450 million. The transaction allows TPG to gain control of AAPT's fibre-optic network, which extends across six Australian states and territories, and is estimated to be 11,000 km in length. The transaction was expected to be finalised by February 2014.

On 13 March 2015, TPG advised of its intent to take over Australia's third largest ISP iiNet at $8.60 per share, giving a value of $1.4 billion. TPG offered $8.60 per iiNet share, on top of the entitlement to the already-declared 10.5-cent interim dividend, valuing iiNet at about 21 times its underlying net profit for 2014. The deal was approved by shareholders on 27 July, and by the ACCC on 20 August 2015. This made TPG Australia's second-largest ISP by customer volume after Telstra.

=== Ventures ===
On 7 May 2013, TPG won a $13.5 million bid for two 10 MHz spectra of the 2.5 GHz band in Australia. TPG, which operates a mobile virtual network, in a statement, announced that the network would allow it to offer "value-adding" wireless broadband products to its customers. Although TPG did not reveal what the purpose of the spectra would be, the 2.5 GHz band is expected to be used as a 4G channel. The network will be switched on in October 2014.

On 17 September 2013, during TPG's financial year results presentation, it was announced that the company plans on constructing fibre to the Building (FTTB) networks, capable of offering a bandwidth of 100 Mbit/s, in five major capital cities. It was also estimated that the cost of the plans would be $69.99 per month, lower than the current price of NBN plans though it excludes initial connection and setup costs. Although, final costs have yet to be determined, the network is expected to compete with the NBN, leading to calls from the research director of Ovum, David Kennedy, for NBN Co to respond competitively.

On 13 July 2020, Vodafone Hutchison merged with TPG via a scheme of arrangements. TPG was renamed to TPG Corporation Limited and delisted from ASX, with Vodafone Hutchison taking on the TPG Telecom name.

In September 2020, TPG Telecom announced a partnership with the National Australia Bank to deliver fixed and mobile network services for the bank.

==== SIMBA Telecom ====
On 14 December 2016, it was announced that TPG had secured the fourth telecommunications license in Singapore for S$105 million (A$122 million). They were provisionally allocated 60 MHz of spectrum made available in the New Entrant Spectrum Auction (NESA), with spectrum rights that commenced in April 2017. TPG was also expected to provide street level coverage nationwide within 18 months of the start date. TPG launch commercial service in March 2020.

For voice communications, it makes use of Voice over LTE technology which saw subscribers have initial troubles setting up during the trial rollout at the start of 2019 as existing phones did not contain the configuration profile required for the VoLTE functionality to work. These was largely resolved when the major brands added the configuration profile into their operating systems, with Apple adding the profile only in September 2019.

On 30 June 2020, as part of the Vodafone-TPG merger, the Singapore operations were spun off into an independent entity, Tuas Limited. As part of the spin off, Tuas Limited was also listed on the Australian Securities Exchange. In December 2021, TPG won 10MHz of the 2.1GHz frequency spectrum in the government auction, allowing it to deploy its 5G network across the island. SIMBA Telecom has since been an independent company in Singapore, effectively making it a local company with zero TPG Australia's involvement in any of its business operations. In April 2022, the Singapore operations was rebranded from TPG to SIMBA Telecom, in reference to Singapore's 'Lion City' nickname.

== Subsidiaries ==
- AAPT
- PIPE Networks
- Chariot
- Soul
- Lebara Australia
- IntraPower
- iiNet
  - Internode
  - RuralNet
  - Country NetLink
  - Origin Internet
  - Octa4
  - TransACT
    - Grapevine
  - Westnet
  - Netspace
  - Adam Internet

== Divisions ==
=== TPG Internet ===
TPG Internet sells many internet services, such as dialup, ADSL, ADSL2+, fibre and SHDSL broadband access, IPTV, VoIP solutions and virtual phone cards. TPG also include plans and bundles on the National Broadband Network (NBN).

==== Unlimited broadband ====
On 24 September 2010, TPG introduced a phone-line bundled unlimited plan that included unlimited, unmetered uploads and downloads and free IPTV.

==== IPTV ====
After a limited beta, TPG officially launched IPTV service on 12 June 2007. IPTV was available to all ADSL2+ customers on supported exchanges. It was discontinued in 2019.

=== TPG Systems ===
TPG Systems was an OEM of PCs, laptops and servers. This division of the company ceased trading in early 2004.

=== TPG Software ===
TPG Software, trading as Catsoft, makes and sells accounting software to businesses.

=== TPG Boomerang TV ===
TPG Boomerang TV was a subscription television service that operated using PAS 8. It was launched in February 2000.

=== TPG Mobile ===
TPG Mobile acted as a Mobile Virtual Network Operator (MVNO) using the Optus network from August 2008 until late 2015. In September 2015, TPG announced a switch to Vodafone Australia as its mobile service provider, moving its customers from the Optus network to the Vodafone network. Subsequently, in 2020, TPG merged with Vodafone Hutchison Australia (VHA), effectively becoming the owner of the Vodafone network in Australia.

TPG Telecom and Optus have implemented an 11-year regional network-sharing deal under a Multi-Operator Core Network (MOCN) agreement that went live in early 2025. This arrangement allows TPG to use 2,444 Optus mobile network sites across regional Australia, expanding its mobile coverage from around 400,000 square kilometers to approximately 1 million square kilometers, covering 98.4% of Australia's population. In return, Optus gains access to TPG's spectrum, enhancing its network capacity and accelerating its 5G rollout in regional areas. The deal, which received ACCC approval in September 2024, aims to increase competition in the telecommunications market and improve services for customers of both companies.

=== AAPT ===
AAPT is TPG's wholesale arm.

== Subscribers ==
It is Australia's second-largest internet service provider and largest mobile virtual network operator.

Year	Broadband subscribers	Mobile subscribers
2009	388,000	220,000 (130,000 Soul subscribers, 90,000 TPG subscribers)
2010	488,000	201,000 (45,000 Soul subscribers, 156,000 TPG subscribers)
2011	548,000	201,000 (9,000 Soul subscribers, 192,000 TPG subscribers)
2012	595,000	255,000
2013	671,000	360,000

== ACCC lawsuit ==
A lawsuit over TPG's advertising campaigns was filed against TPG Telecom by the Australian Competition & Consumer Commission (ACCC) in December 2010. The ACCC accused TPG of misleading its customers by advertising that its "unlimited" broadband package only cost $29.99 per month when the actual minimum monthly cost for the plan is $59.99. The ACCC also claimed in the lawsuit that TPG did not adequately disclose other costs associated with the setting up of the connection. In response, TPG released a statement saying that it believes all costs were adequately noted in the advertisement and that it was "disappointed" with the ACCC's decision to bring the issue to court. In November 2011, the Federal Court ruled against TPG and fined the company $2 million, however the fine was reduced to $50,000 after TPG appealed to the full bench of the Federal Court. The ACCC later filed an appeal in the High Court, which was approved in August 2013.

== Email migration ==
In 2023, TPG commenced steps to discontinue provision of email services. An option was given to customers to close their email account or migrate email accounts to an independent organisation called 'The Messaging Company'.

== See also ==
- Internet television in Australia
- Subscription television in Australia
