= Michael Malone (businessman) =

Irish/Australian technology entrepreneur and business executive

- Born: 1969 (age 56–57); Ennis, County Clare
- Education: Postgraduate Diploma in Education, Bachelor of Science in Mathematics
- Alma mater: The University of Western Australia
- Occupations: Director NBN Co 2016-2025 Director Seven West Media 2015-current Director WiseTech Global 2021-current Director Speedcast 2014-2020; Director Superloop 2014-2020; Director Dreamscape 2015-2017; Chairman of Diamond Cyber Security 2014-2020 Managing Director of iiNet 1994-2014
- Known for: ISP Entrepreneur; Internet consumer rights Technology pioneer businessman

Michael Malone is an Irish/Australian technology entrepreneur and business executive. He was the founder and managing director of the Perth-based telecommunications provider iinet starting the business in his parents' garage. He is a pioneer of dial up access back in 1993 before the Internet became mainstream. Over the years he has been an advocate for Internet consumer rights as well participating in the metadata debate. He was appointed as a non executive director of the NBNco in 2016 until 2025

== Early life ==
Malone was born in, County Clare, Ireland and migrated to Australia in 1978 with his parents and two brothers.

== Education ==
Malone attended Christian Brothers College Leederville (now Aranmore Catholic College). He has a Bachelor of Science in Mathematics and Post Graduate Diploma in Education from The University of Western Australia.

== iiNet (Telecommunications Company) ==
Michael Malone and Michael O'Reilly founded iiNet in 1993, starting the business in a suburban garage in Perth, Western Australia as iiNet Technologies Pty Ltd. It began as one of the first Australian Internet Service Providers (ISPs) to offer TCP/IP Internet access, as opposed to the store-and-forward techniques (such as MHSnet) that were then in use at other ISPs. It claims it was the first ISP to offer PPP access in Australia, and to be the first to base operations on the then new Linux operating system.

The company outgrew its suburban home in 1995 and moved to Perth CBD office accommodation yet its early growth during the Internet boom was hampered by the ability of Telstra (not releasing Bigpond as an ISP until 1997) to cope with the demand of needed telephone lines, and by the sheer competitive pressure in the Perth market, which had a comparative oversupply of low-cost providers. In 1996, iiNet successfully expanded into the Adelaide market under the name light.iinet.net.au (named after Colonel Light), in partnership with locals John Lindsay and Leigh Hart.

iiNet listed on the Australia Stock Exchange in September 1999.

During his executive tenure at iiNet, Malone aggressively grew iiNet by acquiring other leading ISPs all over Australia. He grew the company to become the second largest ISP in Australia. He was also a passionate advocate for Internet consumer rights in regards to privacy as well contributing to the metadata debate.

Malone was a lead witness and spokesperson in the Roadshow Films Pty Ltd v iiNet Ltd copyright case that was successful in the High Court of Australia.

Malone stepped aside as managing director in early 2014 after taking a three-week holiday in Argentina which was supposed to be a three-month to six-month sabbatical. In 2015, iiNet was acquired by TPG Telecom.

== Business career ==
After leaving iiNet, Malone co-founded and was chairman of Perth-based information security company Diamond Cyber, which was sold to CyberCX in 2020.

He joined the board of NBN Co from 2016 to 2025.

Malone has served on the board of Seven West Media, SpeedCast, Superloop, Axicom, and Dreamscape Limited.

Malone was appointed to the board of ASX Listed logistics software company WiseTech Global. in 2020 and resigned along with three other independent directors in 2025

== Awards ==
Malone was named as 2006 First among Equals in the 40 under 40 Awards, Australian "Entrepreneur of the Year" in 2011 and the Charles Todd Medal in 2013.
