= Elektra v. Santangelo =

American legal case

- Court: United States District Court for the Southern District of New York
- Full case name: Elektra Entertainment Group Inc., et al v. Patricia Santangelo
- Decided: November 28, 2005
- Docket nos.: 7:05-cv-02414
- Citation: 78 U.S.P.Q.2d 1702

Court membership
- Judge sitting: Colleen McMahon

Elektra v. Santangelo, 78 U.S.P.Q.2d 1702 (S.D.N.Y. 2005) was a case filed by Elektra Entertainment Group against Patricia Santangelo, a mother of five. In the suit it was alleged that she illegally shared six songs over KaZaA file-sharing network. The suit was eventually dismissed in 2007 with prejudice by a federal judge. The RIAA later sued two of Ms. Santangelo's children. A default judgment was entered against one of them, Michelle Santangelo. Ms. Santangelo's 16-year-old son Robert Santangelo has interposed counterclaims against the plaintiffs, including "failure to warn".

== Background ==
The suit against Patricia Santangelo was filed by Elektra Entertainment Group as one of approximately 13,000 lawsuits that the Recording Industry Association of America (RIAA) has brought against individual defendants in the U.S before the United States District Court for the Southern District of New York. It alleged that Patricia (Patti) Santangelo, a single mother of five based in Wappingers Falls, New York, infringed the copyright of several companies by sharing six songs on the KaZaA file-sharing network. Elektra offered to settle the case for $7,500, but Mrs. Santangelo rejected the offer. She says that she didn't realize that her computer contained KaZaA software, and that the KaZaA account name listed in the suit had never been used by anyone in her family; the name was said to be "similar" to the screen name of a teenage friend of one of her children.

One frequently cited criticism of the RIAA's lawsuits is that they use an assembly line approach to lawsuits, trying to get the same result in every case no matter the evidence, trying to carry out the lawsuits and settlements in the most efficient way, and acting as if lawsuits are a standard part of business. This case is somewhat notable because the judge, the Honorable Colleen McMahon, appears to agree with some of those criticisms in a dialog with Mike Maschio, an RIAA attorney:

THE COURT: Well, I think it would be a really good idea for you to get a lawyer, because I would love to see a mom fighting one of these.

MR. MASCHIO: I'll give her my card, but our instructions are for these people to deal with the conference settlement center. They had discussions.

THE COURT: I'm sorry. Your instructions from me, the Judge are that, if she appears with a lawyer, her lawyer will deal with you.

MR. MASCHIO: No, all I was suggesting, your Honor, is that, if she doesn't come with an attorney, that the more direct way of doing this—and this is just to facilitate things—is to deal directly with the conference center.

THE COURT: Not once you've filed an action in my court. ... You file an action in my court, your conference center is out of it. They have nothing to do with anything. ... You're taking up my time and cluttering up my calendar, so you will do it in the context of the Court. ... And if your people want things to be done through the conference center, tell them not to bring lawsuits.

Mrs. Santangelo originally appeared in court without a lawyer. She was later represented by Ray Beckerman of Beldock Levine & Hoffman LLP. For a brief period she appeared pro se again, and since then has been represented by Jordan Glass of Valhalla, New York. Her former lawyer Beckerman commented "I'm sure she's going to win. I don't see how they could win. They have no case. They have no evidence she ever did anything."

During the proceedings for their Motion to Dismiss, after the oral argument of the motion, the RIAA's lawyers asked for a second oral argument. According to Ray Beckerman this was unusual:

I would say that asking for a second oral argument is unusual, because (a) in almost 31 years of working in litigation I’ve never heard of anyone doing it, and (b) the very asking for it is an admission that the first oral argument was lost.

p2pnet.net, whose readers raised a total of more than $15,000 to help Mrs Santangelo with her legal expenses, ran an interview with her in 2005. In it, she declared,

Don’t let your fear of these massive companies allow you to deny your belief in your own innocence. Paying these settlements is an admission of guilt. If you’re not guilty of violating the law, don’t pay.

== RIAA Response ==
The RIAA contends that illegally shared files were found on a computer with an IP address connected to Ms. Santangelo, and that this is sufficient grounds for continuing to pursue the lawsuit. In a CNN American Morning interview, Miles O'Brien discussed the case with Ms. Santangelo and RIAA President Cary Sherman. The following excerpts from a transcript of the interview summarize the RIAA's position:

... We were disappointed that Ms. Santangelo didn't take advantage of an opportunity to get rid of this case quickly, as most people have when they find that somebody in their household or somebody using their computer was in the wrong.

And we tried to be very fair and reasonable about this and take these matters up on a case-by-case basis. But the important thing is to get the message out there that ... uploading or downloading music without authorization on the Internet is illegal.

[S]omebody has to assume responsibility for what's happening with kids. And I think parents need to have some kind of conversation with their kids about how to use the computer the right way and the wrong way.

[T]he reality is that an overwhelming number of people who have been sued tell us the same story, that they didn't know what was going on, they didn't know it was illegal, and so on and so forth.

In this case, if Ms. Santangelo did not do this, then she should tell us who did, and we would modify the complaint accordingly.

We had one grandfather who had those kids work off the amount that he paid to settle as a way of teaching them a lesson and making this a family event.

== Case details ==
A motion to dismiss has been filed, stating that "the Courts have consistently required specific acts of copying, and the dates and times of those acts", and the complainant isn't providing those. The plaintiff's response is that the specific files were listed, and that specific times of violations aren't needed, because there is "an ongoing and continuous infringement". This is in conflict with Mrs. Santangelo's statements on the record that the computer's disk has been reformatted because of "a lot of major viruses", and that her ex-husband is now in possession of the computer. RIAA then made the unusual request to have a second oral argument session and to submit an additional surreply. The motion to dismiss the case was denied on 28 November 2005.

Then Elektra sought to dismiss the case "without prejudice" but the Court denied the motion, saying that the RIAA could either dismiss the case with prejudice or proceed to trial. On April 9, 2007, a stipulation of discontinuance with prejudice was entered. Three days later the case was dismissed by a federal judge with prejudice, which means that Santangelo was the prevailing party and therefore eligible to file a motion to recover attorneys' fees.

Elektra proceeded to file suits against Santangelo's son and daughter (Robert and Michelle) based on evidence obtained during the original proceedings. According to legal documents Michelle Santagelo did not respond to this case and a default judgment of $30,750 was approved in favor of Elektra/RIAA.

Robert, however, has not settled. He is also represented by Jordan Glass and is raising 32 defenses including arguments that he didn't send copyrighted files to others, the recording companies originally promoted file sharing, the statute of limitations had passed, and that all of the music on his computer had been owned on CD by his sister. He is counter-suing the record companies for violating antitrust laws, conspiring to defraud the courts, and making extortionate threats.

== See also ==
- RIAA, File-sharing controversy
- File sharing
- David Zamos — another case where an individual was expected to quickly settle, but instead contested the claims, and subsequently gained substantial support from the press

== External links and sources ==
- RIAALawsuits.us - Documents from the case
- MTV News - Single Mother Of Five Takes On RIAA In Downloading Case
- Corante Copyfight weblog - an interview with Ray Beckerman
- Interview with the RIAA Mom - Sept 6, 2005 MP3 Newswire article
- Associated Press (December 26, 2005). "Mom Fights RIAA Suit Solo". Wired.
- News report compilation, including RIAA President's response: WMV format Google Video
