= Mobile Black Spot Program =

The Mobile Black Spot Program is an ongoing Australian federal government funding program aimed at adding mobile phone reception to areas which do not have it, such as communities, transport routes and tourist destinations. As of October 2022, over 1,200 mobile base stations have been funded and a total of 1,047 constructed by Telstra, Optus, TPG Telecom (formerly Vodafone), and Field Solutions Group (FSG). The need for a mobile black spot funding program was first identified in the government's 2011–12 Regional Telecommunications Review, with the first of the towers built under the program being switched on in December 2015. Mobile base stations built under the program are funded with contributions from the Commonwealth, the network operators themselves, and in some cases, state and local governments.

== History ==
The program was established when the 2011–12 Regional Telecommunications Review found that the mobile coverage footprint in Australia was approaching the limit of commercial viability and financial incentive for network operators to continue expansion, which would leave many areas to continue to lack phone reception as there would not be an incentive for mobile carriers to continue expanding themselves. Prior to the establishment of the program, the government took submissions from the public for black spots to be addressed, with over 6,000 black spots throughout the country being submitted by the public.

The Mobile Black Spot Program was an election promise of Tony Abbott's election campaign in 2013, when he pledged $20 million of government funding specifically to the program, $80 million to improving coverage in areas such as major transport routes and stated intention to collaborate with NBN Co to co-locate black spot funded towers on existing NBN fixed wireless towers.

=== Round 1 ===
499 base stations were funded under the first round of the program, with $100 million of government money. Telstra received funding to build 429 base stations, and Vodafone got 70. Optus was absent from this first round. The first tower out of this round to be commissioned was a Vodafone tower, at the White Rock Wind Farm near Glen Innes, New South Wales.

=== Round 2 ===
266 base stations were funded under round 2 of the program, with $57.5 million of federal government money, and $54 million contributed from state and local governments. 146 sites were built by Telstra, 113 were built by Optus, and Vodafone got funding for just 4, which they expressed disappointment about.

=== Round 3 (Priority Locations) ===
Round 3 of the program was focused on locations perceived to be of a high priority by the government. $60 million was allocated to 89 locations. Optus was allocated 12 sites, Vodafone got one, the remainder of the funding going to Telstra. The first tower under this round was switched on in June 2018, at East Lynne, New South Wales.

=== Round 4 ===
180 base stations were built from the $25 million allocated to this round of the program. Telstra built 131 towers, and Optus 49, with Vodafone absent from funding in this round.

=== Round 5 ===
182 new base stations were funded under this round, funding for which Telstra got 97 mobile sites, Optus 83, and Field Solutions Group got 2, who also made their debut in the program in this round. $36.8 million of Commonwealth government money was used in this round.

=== Round 5A ===
Round 5A was established as a supplementary round to Round 5, as out of the $80 million allocated to the round initially, only $36.8 million was used. Under this round, there was a specific focus on major transport routes and disaster prone areas. Field Solutions Group received funding to trial their neutral host model, which would have the possibility of providing reception to customers of any mobile carrier. FSG built these towers along the Adventure Way in Queensland, in conjunction with Optus. 67 new base stations were funded under this round, with Telstra getting funding for 48, Optus for 4, and the remainder going to FSG.

=== Round 6 (Improving Mobile Coverage) ===
Round 6 has been dubbed the "improving mobile coverage" round, set to target 54 locations, for which $80 million of funding has been committed.

== Reception ==
=== From the telcos ===
Vodafone, after receiving funding to build just 4 base stations in round 2 of the program, criticised Telstra's dominant share in the program. After this, they attempted to convince the ACCC to declare domestic mobile roaming, a policy which would allow all mobile network providers to roam on the infrastructure of any other provider, and thereby greatly increase the regional network footprint of Vodafone in particular. The ACCC launched an inquiry into domestic roaming but decided against it, declaring it would "harm the interests of consumers by undermining the incentives of mobile operators to make investments to compete with each other in regional areas". Vodafone later attempted to dispute the decision in the Federal Court of Australia, but ultimately lost the case.

=== From the public ===
In multiple instances, the telecommunications company chosen to construct a phone tower has caused some controversy in the communities served, usually in cases where Optus was selected to build a phone tower in an area already dominated by Telstra. Complaints were made that in order to make use of this tower, phone users would have to subscribe to the Optus network, which would only be usable in that given area, and not the other surrounding areas served exclusively by Telstra. The Tjukayirla Roadhouse is an example of this situation, where Optus received funding as they were the only telco to apply for a tender at this location. In another instance, the owner of the Archer River Roadhouse in far north Queensland described the decision to build an Optus site instead of Telstra at that location as "ludicrous", as residents of the nearby area used exclusively Telstra services. Telstra went on and built a base station at Archer River Roadhouse. Somewhat proving how the program stimulates competition between the carriers.

=== Australian National Audit Office ===
The Australian National Audit Office (ANAO) criticised round 1 of the program, believing it provided taxpayers "poor value for money". A report from the auditor found that out of the 499 base stations built under round 1, 39 would have been built anyway by the network operators without needing public funding, and another 89 only provided minimal benefit to residents lacking coverage.

In 2024, an ANAO probe found the $40 million of the Communications Department's spending in Round 6 to be "largely effective", amidst allegations of "pork barreling" project funds to districts based on their political leanings.
