= Dalwhinnie Wines =

Coordinates: 36.971779°S 143.252101°E

- Company type: Private company
- Industry: Winemaking; Viticulture; Tourism
- Headquarters: Australia
- Area served: Worldwide
- Key people: Ewan Jones (Founder); David Jones (Director); Jenny Jones (CEO)
- Products: Wine
- Website: dalwhinnie.com.au

Dalwhinnie Wines was established in 1976 by Ewan Jones. The vineyard is located in the cool climate of Moonambel (Victoria, Australia). Moonambel is a sub-region of Victoria's Pyrenees wine region, which was pioneered by the vineyards of Taltarni, Warrenmang, Redbank (Sally's Paddock) and Dalwhinnie.

During the early – mid 1970s Ewan Jones (an Architect based in Ballarat) began clearing 35 acres of land in Moonambel; which would be the site of the main Dalwhinnie vineyard in years to come.

After the planting of Shiraz and Cabernet Sauvignon in 1976, Ewan's wife Betty named the site 'Dalwhinnie' as a homage to her Scottish heritage. In 1983, David Jones (Ewan's oldest son) took over the management of the vineyard and the brand. Over the subsequent 18 years David, and wife Jenny, continue to plant vines; adding Chardonnay and Pinot Noir to the varietal mix.

Dalwhinnie has a unique microclimate that is vastly different from their direct neighbours. With an elevation around 550 metres above sea level and an amphitheatre shaped topography, any cool air funnels away from the vines, making the vineyard almost impervious to frost. The soil is sedimentary and relatively infertile, and the grapes are hand-harvested between February and April; depending on the variety and the attributes of the vintage.

Dalwhinnie is the only winery within the greater Pyrenees region to have two listings within the Langton's Classification of Australian Wine consisting of 'Outstanding' for The Eagle Shiraz, and 'Excellent' for the Moonambel Shiraz.

Their wines' have continued to achieve worldwide acclaim from experts such as Robert M. Parker, Jr. and James Halliday amongst others.

== See also ==
- Moonambel, Victoria
- North Central Victoria
