= Brett Novak (media personality) =

Australian television presenter

- Born: 1984 (age 41–42); Perth, Western Australia, Australia
- Education: B.Com (Curtin University); Grad Dip (Western Australian Academy of Performing Arts); Dip Tech (Curtin University)
- Occupations: Creative Director of The Freeform Foundry Australia; TV personality
- Known for: Our Town; Byte Me

Brett Novak is an Australian entrepreneur and media personality, best known as a television presenter on the Seven Network television program Our Town and as the Creative Director of advertising agency The Freeform Foundry.

== Early life and education ==
Novak was born in Perth, Western Australia, Australia. He graduated with Honours in Performing Arts from Corpus Christi College, Perth. He then studied Interactive Multimedia & Design and in 2009 completed a Bachelor of Commerce (Marketing & Advertising) at Curtin University in Bentley, Western Australia, while working as a designer, developer & salesperson.

== Career ==
=== Advertising and business career ===
Novak began his career in marketing working client side in the renewables sector, starting as a Graphic Designer before working his way to become a National Marketing Manager. After moonlighting alongside his full-time position, in 2011 he formed a team and founded digital marketing & advertising agency The Freeform Foundry, which provided a platform to launch several other businesses. He has been responsible for launching major Advertising campaigns for Tourism Australia among other iconic Australian brands and developments.

=== Media career ===
After completing studies at Western Australian Academy of Performing Arts, in April 2016 it was announced he would host the weekend program Our Town on Australian television network Seven Network with co-host Pip O'Connell. Novak is also a guest on FM radio networks Nova 93.7 and Hit 92.9 and has featured in advertising campaigns for companies including Westnet.

=== Television appearances ===
Year	Title	Role	Notes
2005	Byte Me	Presenter	TV series (5 Episodes)
2015	Rough Cuts	Presenter	TV series (1 Episode)
2015	Channel Seven Perth Telethon	Presenter	TV Event
2016	Our Town	Presenter	TV series (10 Episodes)
2016	Channel Seven Perth Telethon	Presenter	TV Event
2017	Our Town	Presenter	TV series (Pre-Production)

=== Cosmopolitan Media Bachelor Of The Year 2016 ===
On 12 September 2016, Novak was nominated for Cosmopolitan Media Bachelor Of The Year, among 90 Australian media and marketing personalities.

=== Charity boxing event ===
On 4 March 2018, Novak was announced as the main card in the Perth Corporate Rumble, a charity boxing event against The Bachelor, Richie Strahan.
