= Moonambel =

- Town
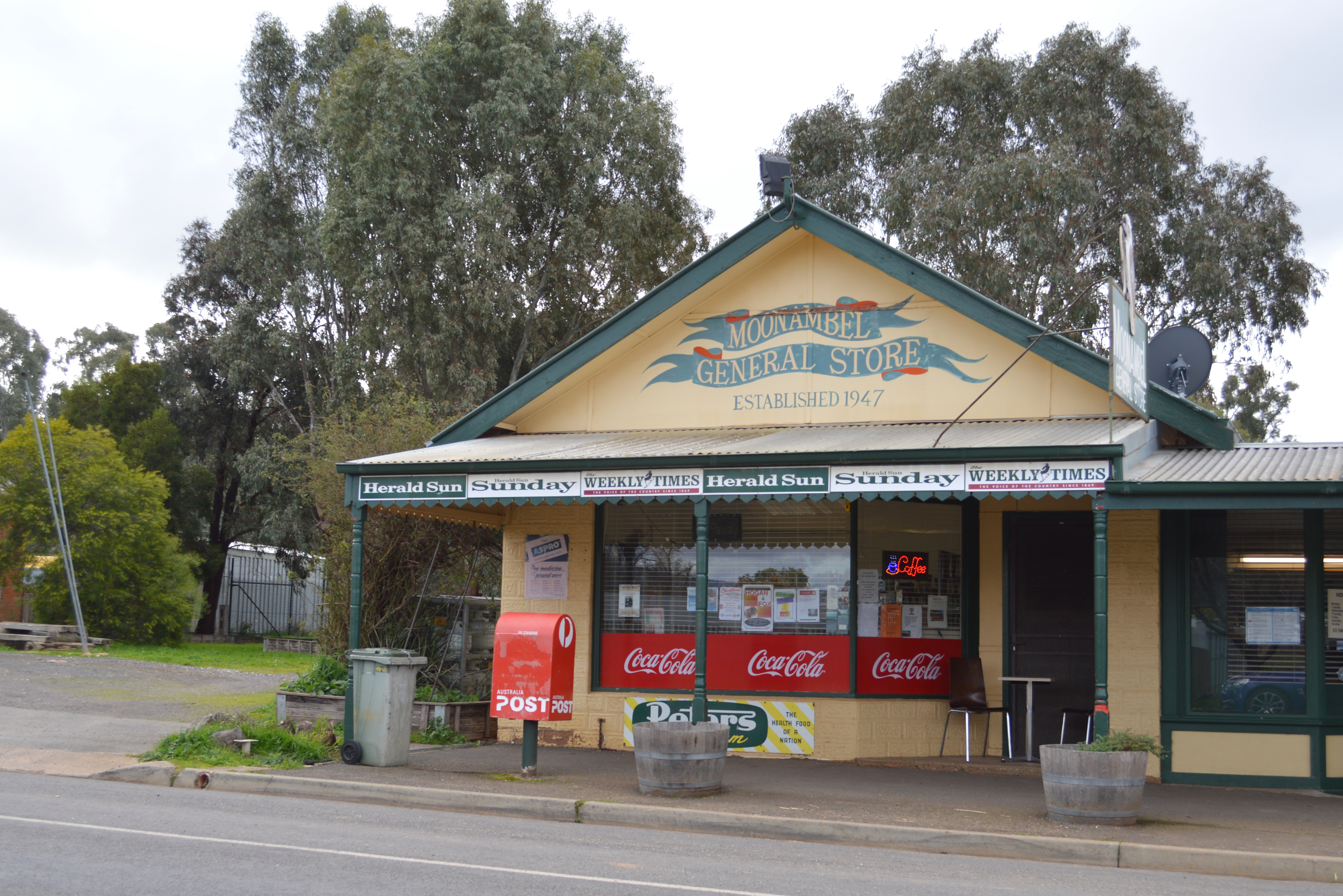
- Moonambel General Store

- Coordinates: 36.984321°S 143.310974°E
- Country: Australia
- State: Victoria
- LGA: Pyrenees Shire
- Location: 200 km (120 mi) NW of Melbourne; 90 km (56 mi) W of Castlemaine

Government
  - State electorate: Ripon
  - Federal division: Mallee

Population
  - Total: 185 (SAL 2021)
Localities around Moonambel
Barkly	Redbank	Natte Yallock
Frenchmans	Moonambel	Tanwood
	Warrenmang	Percydale

Moonambel is a town in the Pyrenees region of the Australian state of Victoria, situated along the Stawell-Avoca Road [about 8 kilometres (5.0 mi) from the junction with the Sunraysia Highway]. The town is located in the Pyrenees Shire Local Government Area, near the heart of the Pyrenees wine region. The name 'Moonambel' is believed to be an aboriginal word meaning 'hollow in the hills'.

The population of Moonambel, as recorded at the 2016 Census, was 167 with a median age of 59. There were 116 private dwellings in Moonambel and the surrounding district.

== History ==
In the 1850s the location of Moonambel was part of the ‘Mountain Creek’ pastoral run, consisting of 80,000 acres. In 1853 ‘Mountain Creek’ station was running about 16,000 sheep.

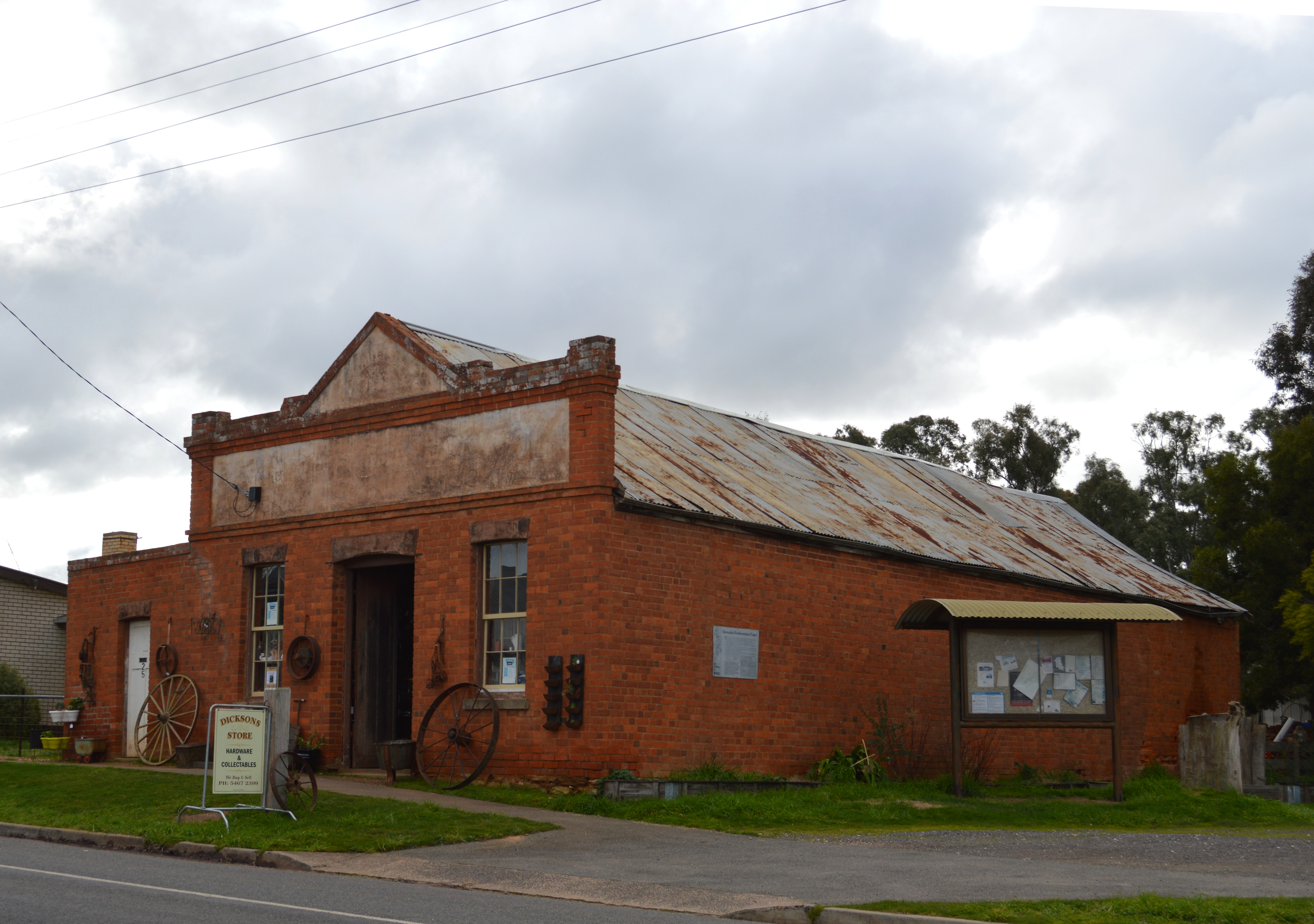
Dickson's Store, Moonambel – John Dickson (1827-1874) was storekeeper during the early history of the township.

In December 1860 reports began to appear of a gold-rush at McKinnon's ‘Mountain Creek’ station. By mid-January 1861 a visitor to “McKinnon’s Goldfield” professed to be “utterly astounded at the extent of the diggings”, which were situated “at the head of a small creek, which runs from a spur of the Pyrenees into the Avoca River”. On the flat at the head of the creek were “several hundred holes, from five to fifteen feet deep, yielding payable returns”. The writer claimed “there are about 10,000 people on this diggings, including storekeepers, etc., and almost everyone is doing well”.

By May 1861 the township that had developed on the Mountain Creek diggings was named “Moonambel”. In June 1861 sixty-one town allotments were offered for sale at Moonambel. On 21 October 1861 the “municipal district of Moonambel, on Mountain Creek” was proclaimed.

In January 1865 the municipal councils of Avoca and Moonambel, as well as the Avoca Road Board, amalgamated to form the Avoca Shire Council.

In July 1865 a correspondent from Moonambel wrote that “this little township has at last, after being latent for some time, begun to have rather a lively appearance in the way of future prosperity and success”. It was expected that the nearby Slaughteryard Reef would have stone-crushing machinery installed. The writer added that “in agricultural matters… a vast number of beautiful farms are now under cultivation”.

In the 1871 Census Moonambel is recorded as having a population of 280. In 1875 an Anglican school that had opened in 1861 at Moonambel was replaced by a government school in a substantial brick building.

In the Census of 1881 Moonambel is recorded as having a population of 604 inhabitants.

A description of Moonambel published in 1903 in the Australian Handbook contains the following details: “population, about 250”; three churches (Anglican, Roman Catholic and Wesleyan); the Commercial Hotel; a soap manufactory; “mining and farming are the chief employments of the inhabitants”; “there is a flourishing vineyard and a Government crushing battery here”; “lighted with kerosene”.

In the mid-1880s W. A. Adams had planted 40 acres of wine grapes on his “Mountain Creek estate” one mile east of Moonambel. The vineyard was acquired by John Kofoed in 1918 who set about re-working and revitalising the old and damaged vines. The varieties cultivated were Hermitage, Miller's Burgundy, Dolcetto, Cabernet, Sauvignon, Chasselas and Pedro, with one-third of the vineyard planted to Cabernet. In 1934 Kofoed was one of only two producers of the Cabernet variety in Victoria. Wines produced from John Kofoed's ‘Mountain Creek’ vineyard were mainly sold on the domestic market, though some were exported to England.

In the Census of 1961 Moonambel had a population of 105.

== Telecommunications ==
Moonambel's location in a valley and in a sparsely populated part of the state resulted in poor mobile phone reception which impacted on local residents and tourists. A base station was funded under the Mobile Black Spot Program and built in 2017.

== See also ==
- Adelaide Lead, Victoria
- Glenmona Bridge
- Homebush, Victoria
- Lamplough, Victoria
- Pyrenees Highway, Victoria
- Rathscar, Victoria
- Redbank, Victoria
- Wareek, Victoria
