= Netspace =

Business enterprise

- Type: Subsidiary
- Founded: 1992
- Founder: Stuart Marburg; Richard Preen
- Fate: Acquired by iiNet

Netspace was one of the major Internet service providers of Australia.

== History ==
Netspace was founded in 1992 by Stuart Marburg and Richard Preen. The company initially offered dial-up internet access, as was the standard at the time. The company's headquarters were located in Camberwell, a suburb in the city of Melbourne, in the state of Victoria, Australia.

Netspace was an earlier adopter of DSL in Australia and quickly focused primarily on offering ADSL-based Internet access. It initially offered Telstra ADSL and then installed its own DSLAMs in some regions, including Tasmania. The company offered services to retail, SoHo and business customers, including DNS, co-location, web hosting and VoIP, as well as core internet products.

On 29 March 2010, an agreement was entered into which Netspace would be acquired by the larger ASX-listed ISP, iiNet, for AU$40 million. The company later retired Netspace as a brand. Netspace's official website redirects to the webpage of iiNet, but Netspace email addresses continue to be supported.

== See also ==
- Internet in Australia
