= Comindico =

Australian telecommunications company

COMindico
- Type: Private Company (Defunct)
- Industry: Telecommunications
- Founded: 2000 purchased in 2004 by SPT.
- Headquarters: Sydney, Australia (headquarters)
- Products: Telephone, Internet Access
- Website: www.comindico.com.au

COMindico was an Australian IP telecommunications carrier. It started as IPTel in 2000 by Wayne Passlow with the backing of AGL, AMP, JPMorganChase, James Packer (CPH) and Lachlan Murdoch (Queensland Press). The COMindico name came from the Latin Indico coupled with COM to represent communications.

COMindico built a 100% Cisco-powered IP/MPLS network with SS7 interconnects to Telstra from its 66 POPs situated in each of Telstra's call collection zones, allowing VoIP and internet access to over 97% of Australians. It was the largest rollout of Cisco's MGCP technology in the world at the time.

The business was started as wholesale only and then included selling directly to corporates.

In late 2001, the company had spent most of its initial funding and the business model was not delivering to initial investor expectations. In January 2002, The Board replaced the Chair and a number of the senior management and appointed John Stuckey as CEO, with a mandate to repurpose the business model. Stuckey and his team were able to secure a $65 million (AUD) permanent suspense of the hardware debt to CISCO, requiring the existing shareholders funding the business turnaround. AGL, JPMorgan and AMP participated in raising half the required funds and CISCO agreed to the debt suspension on a half now half later agreement.

Thanks to the support of a number of wholesale clients, like Larry Kestleman's Dodo, and a number of fast growing ISP's, Comindico reached profitability in early 2004. Cisco now approached the Board seeking the additional half of the 2002 agreed funding investment to pursue their edge technology using Comidico's network. The Board (AMP, JPMorgan and AGL representatives) formed a view the business could manage without the additional funds, appointed a new management team, sent Stuckey on gardening leave and commenced brinkmanship with CISCO.

In July 2004, Cisco (the largest creditor) placed the business into receivership.

Later in 2004, SP Telemedia (now Soul Australia) acquired COMindico. In April 2008, TPG acquired Soul Australia in a reverse takeover.
