= Redbank, Victoria =

Redbank
- Town
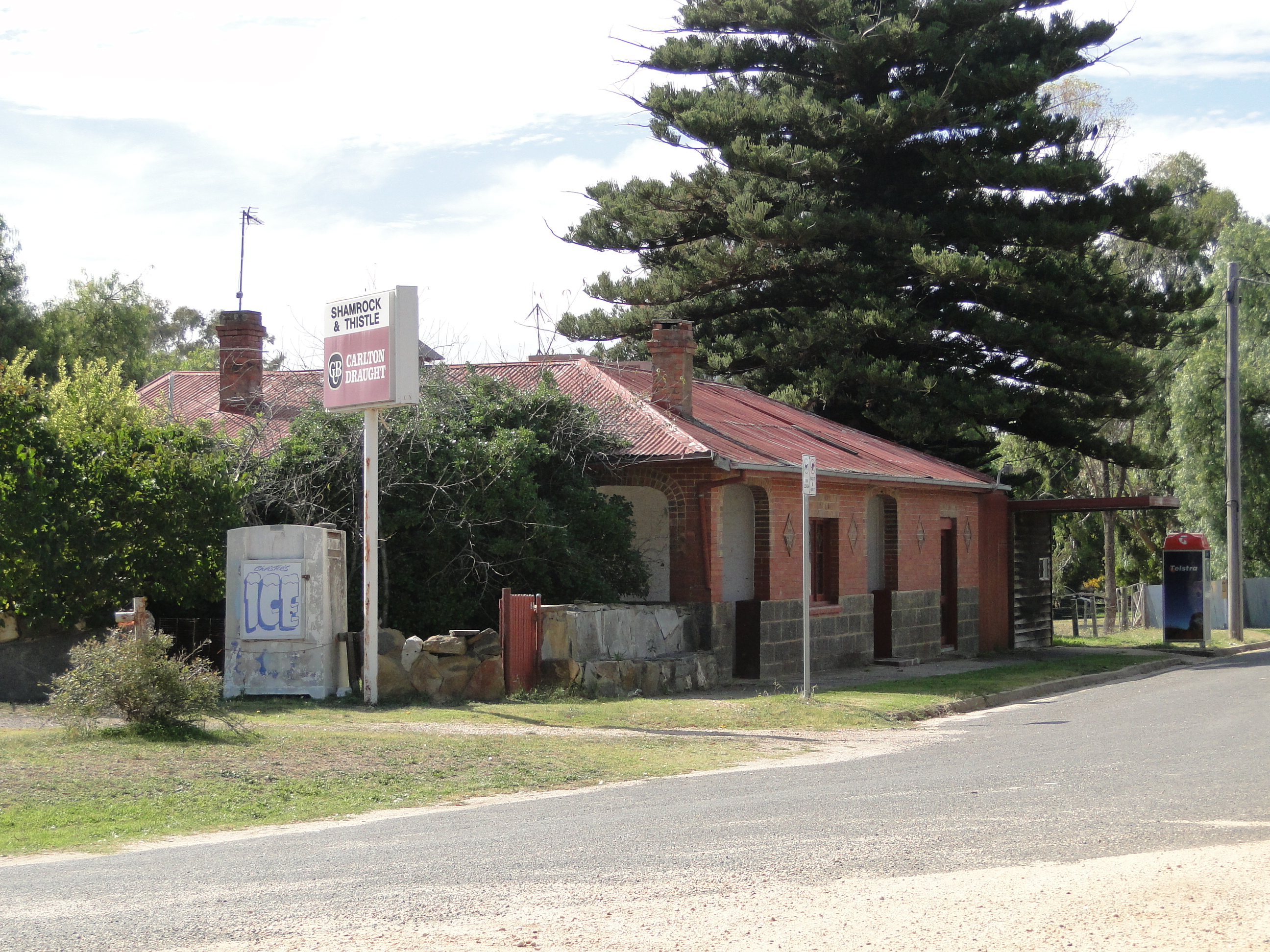
- Shamrock and Thistle Hotel at Redbank, 2012

- Coordinates: 36°56′10″S 143°19′25″E
- Country: Australia
- State: Victoria
- LGA: Pyrenees Shire
- Location: 205 km (127 mi) NW of Melbourne; 93 km (58 mi) NW of Ballarat; 10 km (6.2 mi) N of Moonambel

Government
  - State electorate: Riopn
  - Federal division: Mallee

Population
  - Total: 94 (2016 census)
- Postcode: 3477

Redbank is a town in central Victoria, Australia. The town is in the Shire of Pyrenees local government area, 151 kilometres (94 mi) west of the state capital, Melbourne. At the 2016 census, Redbank had a population of 94.

In 1860 Gold was discovered in Redbank leading to about 2000 people to rush to the area however in 1861 gold was found elsewhere and much of the town relocated.
