= Australian Screen Association =

Copyrights Body

- Formation: 2004
- Type: NGO
- Purpose: Copyright protection lobbying
- Region served: Australia
- Affiliations: Federation Against Copyright Theft
- Website: www.screenassociation.com.au

The Australian Screen Association (ASA) (formerly known as Australian Federation Against Copyright Theft) is an anti-piracy lobby group that was established in 2004. Its aim is to protect the film and television industry and retailers from what it claims are adverse impacts of copyright infringement in Australia. The Australian Screen Association is affiliated with the United Kingdom organisation, Federation Against Copyright Theft and the United States organisation MPAA.

ASA actively works to reduce camcorder recording of films screened in cinemas. It is also dedicated to educating people about its own view of copyright infringement.

In mid-2011, the Pirate Party Australia accused AFACT of intimidating ISPs after they threatened unspecified actions if they didn't engage with the organisation in talks on file-sharing.

A leaked diplomatic cable revealed that AFACT was acting as the MPAA's Australian subcontractor and that the MPAA wanted to avoid the view that the court case was about Hollywood trying to bully an Australian ISP.

== Members ==
The organisation comprises Walt Disney Studios Home Entertainment, 20th Century Fox, Paramount Pictures, Roadshow Entertainment, Sony Pictures, Universal Pictures, Warner Brothers and the MPAA.

== Court case ==
The organisation brought a lawsuit to the Federal Court of Australia against Australian internet service provider, iiNet, on 20 November 2008, alleging that iiNet had authorised copyright infringement on its network. AFACT had used Dtecnet, a company that tracks online copyright infringement to discover users sharing copyrighted content through BitTorrent.

The Federal Court decision cleared iiNet on 4 February 2010. Justice Cowdroy found that "mere provision of access to internet is not the means to infringement".

AFACT lost its appeal to the Federal Court on 24 February 2011. It was ordered to pay iiNet's legal bills.

AFACT lost a further appeal to the High Court of Australia on 20 April 2012.

== See also ==
- Internet in Australia
- Legal aspects of file sharing
- Trade group efforts against file sharing
