= John Nicholas (judge) =

Australian judge

John Victor Nicholas (born 9 August 1958) is an Australian barrister and retired judge of the Federal Court of Australia.

== Biography ==
One of two children born to Ken Nicholas and Betty Jinks, Nicholas attended Clovelly Public School, Randwick Boys High School and Kew High School. He graduated from the University of New South Wales with bachelor's degrees in laws and arts.

Nicholas admitted as a solicitor in 1982 and as a barrister in 1987, becoming senior counsel in 2001. As senior counsel, his focus was in commercial law. He became a judge of the Federal Court of Australia on 16 February 2009. On 1 May 2025, Nicholas retired from the Federal Court of Australia.

== See also ==
- List of Judges of the Federal Court of Australia
- Biological patent
