= IiNet =

Australian Internet service provider

iiNet Limited
- Type: Subsidiary
- Industry: Telecommunications
- Founded: 1993; 33 years ago
- Founder: Michael Malone; Michael O'Reilly
- Headquarters: Perth, Western Australia
- Area served: Australia
- Products: Internet access Mobile Telephony; VoIP; Broadband
- Owner: TPG Telecom
- Website: www.iinet.net.au

iiNet Limited is an Australian Internet service provider (ISP) and telecommunications company that sells NBN plans, 4G and 5G Home Wireless Internet and services on its ULTRA Broadband Cable, FTTB and VDSL2 networks.

iiNet also sells mobile phone sim-only plans using the Vodafone network.

iiNet was acquired by TPG in September 2015 for $1.56 billion TPG Telecom has continued to use the brand name iiNet for consumer telecommunications products.

Before its acquisition by TPG Telecom in 2015, iiNet acquired other ISPs, building a customer base in Western Australia, and then expanding into the Eastern States, with major acquisitions including Internode and TransACT.

== History ==
iiNet was founded in 1993 by Michael Malone and Michael O'Reilly, who started the business in a suburban garage in Perth as iiNet Technologies. It began as one of the first Australian ISPs to offer TCP/IP Internet access, as opposed to the store-and-forward techniques (such as MHSnet) that were then in use at other ISPs. It was the first ISP to offer PPP access in Australia and to be the first to base operations on the then-new Linux operating system.

In 1995, the company moved to a CBD office. Early growth during the Internet boom was hampered by the ability of Telstra (not releasing Bigpond as an ISP until 1997) to cope with the demand for needed telephone lines and by the sheer competitive pressure in the Perth market, which had a comparative oversupply of low-cost providers. In 1996, iiNet expanded into the Adelaide market under the name light.iinet.net.au (named after Colonel Light), in partnership with locals John Lindsay and Leigh Hart. The South Australian branch moved to become the number three ISP in the state before being acquired by Auslink in 1998.

=== Early growth ===
In 1997, due to growing demand for infrastructure and an increase in staff numbers, the company relocated to the central QV.1 building. Additionally, during the same period, the Western Australian Internet Association established a peering and interconnection arrangement called WAIX among its members, including iiNet and several other Perth-based ISPs.

With the internet market transitioning to 56K technology in late 1997, traditional racks of modems at ISPs became redundant and expensive. CBD-hosted equipment from Cisco, Ascend, and Livingston became essential to adapt to the changing marketplace. The Perth market also faced competition from budget national providers, notably One.Tel.

In 1998, iiNet's founding partner, Michael Malone, acquired the company entirely and subsequently listed it on the Australian Securities Exchange in September 1999 (ticker symbol IIN). With new capital, iiNet acquired its major local competitors in the Perth area, including Wantree Internet and Omen Internet, and several smaller competitors like Networx Internet, Infinite Data, Octal, and Net Trek Online Services.

This was perceived by most observers as a rationalisation of an unsustainable services market and allowed not only iiNet, but also other providers such as Westnet, EFTel (itself an agglomeration of several ISPs formed in 2000), ArachNet and Global Dial among others to grow in the local market and to expand into fully-fledged national providers.

After the dot-com bubble burst in mid-2000, iiNet fared poorly on the markets – with shares at one stage falling to A$0.20 from a A$1.00 issue price – however its share price recovered as time progressed. In September 2000, iiNet became the first Western Australian provider to offer ADSL technology.

=== Growth through acquisition ===
The company created a new registered telecommunications provider iiTel, later renamed Chime Communications, that sought to improve Internet access prices by making wholesale telephone access much cheaper. This was possible through new interconnection agreements mandated by the Australian Government's deregulation of the telecommunications industry and provided the foundation for iiNet's later move into telephony via its iPhone (later Phone Advantage and Phone 1) and iiNetPhone (later iiNet VoIP) products.

In the early 2000s, iiNet expanded their national coverage by acquiring the following companies:

- RuralNet (Mildura and regional Victoria)
- Tas Access (Tasmania)
- Granite Internet (Fleurieu Peninsula, South Australia)
- RockNet (Rockhampton, Queensland)
- Hartingdale (Sydney)
- Country Netlink (regional Victoria)
- Origin Internet (regional Victoria)
- Froggy Internet (Sydney)
- Virtual Communities (Melbourne)
- Octa4 (Darwin)
- TransACT (Australian Capital Territory and Queanbeyan)

In 2003, iiNet made what was then its biggest acquisition, purchasing key New Zealand provider ihug. The acquisition significantly increased iiNet's share of the Australian and New Zealand Internet market.

In 2005, iiNet acquired the residential ISP business and trademarks of rival OzEmail. That business's business side and infrastructure remained in the ownership of US-parent MCI. OzEmail had been Australia's largest ISP until 2000, when it was acquired by MCI. The retail arm had been neglected, and the company moved very late into ADSL, meaning that it had difficulty positioning itself as a broadband player. iiNet initially used both the OzEmail and iiNet brands on the east coast, but by 2006 iiNet had largely abandoned the OzEmail brand, using its own corporate image across Australia.

=== DSLAM deployment ===
In late 2004, throughout 2005 and into 2006, iiNet moved to introduce their own DSLAM infrastructure (colloquially known as iiSLAMs or iiDSLAMs in the industry) into telephone exchanges Australia-wide. This move allowed iiNet to be the first Australian DSL carrier to offer speeds of over 1.5 Mbit/s to many customers. The maximum download speed was initially 8 Mbit/s (ADSL1), which increased to 12 Mbit/s and later to 24 Mbit/s, as ADSL2/ADSL2+ standards have been ratified and tested with iiNet's equipment. There are currently over 406 enabled exchanges active around Australia, and a list of these exchanges can be found at iiNet's official website.

=== Launch of telephony products ===
2004 saw the introduction of iiPhone in the form of a long-distance carrier.

In February 2005, iiNet launched their full-service iiPhone telephony service with their new range of iiBroadband2 packages, allowing customers to pay their telephony costs entirely through iiNet, including line rental and local calls.

In August 2005, iiNet released iiNetPhone, their consumer VoIP service. The product was an add-on service, available only to customers that also use their iiPhone service. As with most VoIP services, call costs were well under standard market prices for a regular copper line. The iiNetPhone service supports inbound and outbound calls to normal Australian PSTN numbers.

In 2006, iiNet were trialling its MSAN services in three Perth telephone exchanges; but release and expanded trial of these has since been put on hold until further notice. MSANs are iiNet's own full telephone service, meaning they can be completely off Telstra's phone service and onto their own. This would result in a lower line rental price for its customers and free additional add on options to the phone service.

=== Regulatory conflict with Telstra ===
In late 2005, Telstra Wholesale changed its pricing arrangements, each of which forced iiNet to change its product line and pricing. The first of these changes was to the DSLAM port rate, which resulted in an increase in the cost of a 1.5 Mbit port. iiNet reduced the speeds for their two cheapest plans to 512 kbit/s, while doubling the data allowance on these plans in an attempt to placate users. They also rebranded the plans available to their Telstra Wholesale customers (512 kbit/s and 1.5 Mbit/s plans) to iiBroadband1, reserving the iiBroadband2+ moniker to uncapped "Up to 24 Mbit/s" speed plans, only available in areas connected to an exchange with an iiNet DSLAM. In April 2006, another iiBroadband1 (using Telstra Wholesale) plan's speed was reduced to 512 kbit/s (though existing plan users were allowed to keep their speed).

The second was an increase in line rental for iiPhone. The rate was increased from A$29.95 to A$33.36, and was also blamed on price increases from Telstra Wholesale. Michael Malone said in regard to both changes, "We're disappointed in the changes to our broadband arrangements and line rental prices from Telstra Wholesale and we're challenging this."

This dispute was resolved, and line rental returned to A$29.95 a month under the re-branded Phone 1 plan on the iiNet website.

=== Suspension and resumption of share trading ===
iiNet's share value slid from A$3.40 in September 2005 to A$1.69 in April 2006. On 18 April 2006, iiNet requested a trading halt pending the release of an announcement. Two days later, it suspended its shares from quotation. Initially, the company advised it intended to resume trading on the ASX the following week, but on 21 April, a local newspaper, WA Business News, speculated that "One line of thought is that uncertainty on behalf of iiNet's bankers, will result in the company embarking on a capital raising to address concerns over banking covenants, and provide its bankers with a measure of confidence." Other speculation in the same article suggested that iiNet may be about to exit New Zealand or the CEO was about to sell his shareholding.

On 1 May 2006, iiNet advised the ASX that its shares would remain suspended, as its March quarter results had been "well below expectations". The company announced on 11 May 2006 that updated financial figures for the previous year would not be released for "one to two weeks". On 13 May, The West Australian business section reported on the matter, and claimed that founder Michael Malone had been "sidelined", and that the company was "open for takeover" according to analysts, who rated Singtel Optus as the most likely suitor. On 18 May, WA Business News agreed with the West's claim that takeover offers were being evaluated, however contradicted the claim that Malone had been sidelined. Meanwhile, ZDNet reported, "It is likely iiNet's management will move more conservatively now that their financial dirty laundry has been so publicly aired. They'll need to remain focused on consolidating their assets after what is expected to be a large drop in iiNet's share price when the stock resumes trading."

On 26 May, the stock was reinstated to official quotation and fell on its first trading day to A$0.85, after the 27 May edition of The West Australian reported that iiNet was in the red for the first time in five years and had vowed not to repeat costly mistakes. PowerTel, a Sydney-based telco, would emerge with a diluted stake of 13% at 85c a share and Michael Malone's share would be diluted to 14.4%.

On 31 May, Amcom Telecommunications announced it had acquired a 19.96% stake in iiNet, becoming the company's largest shareholder.

On 21 June, the Malone family increased their holding to 19.97%.

=== Sale of ihug – New Zealand subsidiary ===
On 20 July 2006 iiNet announced that they were wanting to sell their New Zealand subsidiary – ihug. Potential buyers included Orcon Internet, Vodafone and TelstraClear. The sale to Vodafone NZ was announced on 9 October 2006, at a price of A$36 million – roughly six times ihug's EBIT at the time.

=== 2008 acquisitions ===
January 2008 saw iiNet recommence its acquisition strategy with the purchase of the customer base of local Perth ISP Up'n'away. This was followed in May with the purchase of rival Perth-based ISP Westnet, in a friendly acquisition worth $81 million. In a departure from previous acquisitions, iiNet also announced that Westnet would continue to operate as a separate entity. However, as of 2013 some marketing copy is identical, suggesting at the very least a degree of back-office collaboration now exists.

As part of the Westnet acquisition, iiNet's online gaming presence was closed in August 2008, with operations being moved to the former Westnet gaming site 3FL.

=== 2010 acquisitions ===
iiNet continued to grow through acquisitions by purchasing rival ISP Netspace in March 2010. The deal, valued at $40 million, increased iiNet's total number of broadband subscribers to 520,000, and also followed the pattern of the Westnet takeover with Netspace remaining operational as a separate entity under iiNet.

In late July 2010, iiNet agreed to purchase AAPT's consumer operations for $60 million from Telecom New Zealand. As part of the acquisition, Telecom New Zealand entered into a block-trade agreement to sell their 18.2% share holding in iiNet to "institutional and sophisticated investors", a move viewed by many as a defensive action against a takeover bid from industry rival TPG. The purchase of AAPT increases iiNet's total broadband subscribers to more than 652,000 and total active services to more than 1,326,000.

=== 2011 acquisitions ===
On 16 November 2011 it was announced that iiNet was in the final stages of negotiations in the acquisition of Canberra-based telco TransACT. The acquisition was completed on 30 November 2011 at a cost of $60 million.

On 22 December 2011, iiNet announced it would acquire rival ISP Internode for $105 million with the transaction due to be completed late February 2012.

=== 2013 acquisitions ===
On 4 August 2013 iiNet announced it would be purchasing the South Australian ISP Adam Internet for $60 million, after an identical bid by Telstra was rejected by the Australian Competition & Consumer Commission (ACCC) on grounds that the telco giant would use its acquisition of Adam to undercut its rivals' offers through the use of favourable wholesale supply deals. The sale process was completed at the end of August, with Adam becoming a subsidiary of iiNet.

=== 2025 data breach ===
On 19 August 2025 iiNet's systems were accessed by an unknown third-party.

== AFACT lawsuit ==
On 20 November 2008, the Australian Federation Against Copyright Theft (AFACT) filed a lawsuit against iiNet in the Federal Court of Australia claiming that iiNet infringed copyright by failing to prevent its subscribers from downloading illegally copied material using the BitTorrent peer-to-peer protocol. The lawsuit was co-filed by 34 film and affiliated companies including Village Roadshow, Universal Pictures, Warner Bros. and 20th Century Fox as well the Seven Network, an Australian television broadcaster, and alleges breach of copyright on a number of popular movies and television shows. It was later revealed in a WikiLeaks document AFACT was backed by MPAA.

In response, iiNet issued a statement indicating that iiNet had been passing on the reports of infringement received from AFACT to law enforcement authorities and that iiNet could not disconnect a customer's phone line based on an allegation unproven in the courts. Michael Malone, managing director of iiNet, went on to state that "AFACT is arguing that they don't want to talk to the police, and we should just cut the customers off". However, the Statement of Claim filed at the Federal Court does not indicate AFACT are asking for users to be disconnected but that iiNet subscribers are "prevented" from committing copyright infringement.

The case is regarded as a test case for copyright infringement in Australia, and AFACT was represented by Gilbert + Tobin, the same law firm that successfully sued the makers of Kazaa in 2005.

In 2010, Justice Cowdroy in the Federal Court found in favour of iiNet, noting that while iiNet users did infringe, this was not the responsibility of iiNet to deal with.

On 20 April 2012, the High Court of Australia handed down its decision in Roadshow Films Pty Ltd v iiNet Ltd which confirmed the intervening Federal Court Full Bench decision affirming the first instance decision of Cowdroy, though not supporting all his reasons. In his reasoning, Gummow J. noted, in particular, that the current legislation did not provide a mechanism to deal with peer-to-peer infringements, and it needed to be addressed by the legislature.

== Products and services ==
iiNet Limited provides Broadband and IP telephone communication services to consumers and business customers. Its flagship products are broadband2+ (ADSL2+) services and, more recently, reselling NBN as well as services for businesses.

iiNet was part of the Terria consortium that unsuccessfully bid to build the National Broadband Network in 2008.

iiNet is now a Retail Service Provider (RSP) to serve customers with the NBN (National Broadband Network). Australian consumers can now sign up for services such as fibre to the home (FTTH), FTTC, HFC and fixed wireless. From 2011, iiNet also sold services on the NBN Interim Satellite Service; however, demand for these connections exceeded the available capacity, severely congesting the service. As a result, iiNet withdrew the product from sale in November 2013, and NBN co issued a cease sale for all RSPs in December 2013.

iiNet also offers a variety of mobile services to businesses and the public, which includes post-paid mobile plans and mobile data plans that run on the Vodafone network; iiNet has offered 1000 MB to members at no additional cost for website hosting from the beginning. As of 1 August 2023 the parent company (TPG) killed all the hosted sites which now re-direct to a page saying hosting is EOL. As of 7 August, they advise that email will also cease: iiNet has made the decision to stop providing email services in 2023. This change will help us focus on creating better experiences for our core products: internet and mobile.

== Chime Communications ==
Chime Communications is an Australian telecommunications company founded by iiNet in 1996.

It was the focus of a dispute regarding access to the Telstra PSTN network which was settled by the ACCC in 2007.
