= Roadshow Films Pty Ltd v iiNet Ltd =

2012 Australian court case on copyright law

Roadshow Films v iiNet
- Court: High Court of Australia
- Full case name: Roadshow Films Pty Ltd & Ors v iiNet Ltd
- Decided: 20 April 2012
- Citations: [2012] HCA 16, (2012) 248 CLR 42
- Transcripts: [2011] HCATrans 210 (12 August 2011) – special leave [2011] HCATrans 311 (10 November 2011) [2011] HCATrans 323 (30 November 2011) [2011] HCATrans 324 (1 December 2011) [2011] HCATrans 325 (2 December 2011)

Court membership
- Judges sitting: French CJ, Gummow, Hayne, Crennen and Kiefel JJ

Roadshow Films v iiNet
- Court: Full Court of the Federal Court of Australia
- Full case name: Roadshow Films Pty Ltd & Ors v iiNet Ltd
- Decided: 24 February 2011
- Citation: [2011] FCAFC 23

Court membership
- Judges sitting: Emmett, Jagot and Nicholas JJ

Case opinions
- (2:1) A refusal by an ISP to act on infringement allegations made by or on behalf of a copyright owner is not credible evidence that suggests authorisation might have been inferred. (per Emmett and Nicholas JJ; Jagot J dissenting) (2:1) The AFACT sent infringement notices to iiNet containing insufficient information to enable iiNet to identify relevant iiNet users and to contact each of them. Hence it would be unreasonable for iiNet to take action to prevent primary infringements. (per Emmett and Nicholas JJ; Jagot J dissenting)

Roadshow Films v iiNet
- Court: Federal Court of Australia
- Full case name: Roadshow Films Pty Ltd & Ors v iiNet Ltd
- Decided: 4 February 2010
- Citation: [2010] FCA 24

Court membership
- Judge sitting: Cowdroy J

Roadshow Films Pty Ltd & others v iiNet Ltd (commonly known as AFACT v iiNet) was a case, commenced in the Federal Court of Australia, and then heard on appeal in the Full Federal Court and High Court of Australia.

The litigation was commenced by Roadshow Australia and other movie and television studio members of the organisation then known Australian Federation Against Copyright Theft (AFACT) against iiNet, which in 2008 was Australia's third-largest Internet service provider (ISP).

The trial was one of the first to be live-tweeted in Australian courts, and was done so with permission of the judge.

AFACT claimed that iiNet authorised primary copyright infringement by failing to take reasonable steps to prevent its customers from downloading and sharing infringing copies of films and television programs using BitTorrent.

The trial court delivered judgment on 4 February 2010, dismissing the application and awarding costs to iiNet. An appeal to the Full Court of the Federal Court was dismissed by Emmett and Nicholas JJ (Jagot J dissenting). A subsequent appeal to the High Court was unanimously dismissed on 20 April 2012.

This case is important in copyright law of Australia because it tests copyright law changes required in the Australia–United States Free Trade Agreement, and set a precedent for future law suits about the responsibility of Australian Internet service providers with regards to copyright infringement via their services.

== Background ==
The case against iiNet was filed on 20 November 2008. Speaking on behalf of Village Roadshow, Universal Pictures, Warner Bros. Entertainment, Paramount Pictures, Sony Pictures Entertainment, Twentieth Century Fox Film Corporation, Disney Enterprises, Inc., the Seven Network and others, AFACT claimed that iiNet "had ignored requests from the companies to discipline its customers for breaking copyright laws." The managing director of iiNet, Michael Malone, claimed that "iiNet cannot disconnect a customer's phone line based on an allegation. The alleged offence needs to be pursued by the police and proven in the courts. iiNet would then be able to disconnect the service as it had been proven that the customer had breached our Customer Relations Agreement,"

The film companies' representative, AFACT, had conducted investigations into peer-to-peer-file-sharing network BitTorrent and found evidence that iiNet users had infringed the film companies' copyright. As of July 2008, AFACT sent notices to iiNet, providing information that iiNet users were using BitTorrent to infringe the copyright of the film companies. However, those notices had not enclosed AFACT's methodology. AFACT requested that iiNet prevent its users from infringing copyright through the suspension or termination of accounts of relevant users. The ISP did not act on AFACT's request, stating that, while copyright infringement was not approved, iiNet was not liable to take action on the basis of allegations.

On a directions hearing on 6 February 2009 AFACT claimed that the three major issues were; whether iiNet authorized the acts of infringement, whether iiNet was liable for the actions of its customers and whether the safe harbor provisions of the Copyright Act 1968 protected iiNet. In February 2009, iiNet revealed that it had received legal assistance from its competitor, Telstra.

In March 2009, Broadband Minister Stephen Conroy commented on iiNet's defence. Conroy said in response to iiNet as having "no idea if any customers are illegally downloading music" that this defence was "stunning" and "a classic". The Shadow Communications Minister Nick Minchin criticised the Minister for publicly discussing an active case and suggested he was deflecting attention away from proposed mandatory internet filtering.

More than A$1 million was paid to iiNet for legal costs in developing a defence that was not needed after AFACT made an adjustment to their claim. AFACT removed a claim called conversion which suggested iiNet was using copyright to its own advantage by allegedly allowing customers to illegally download copyrighted material. These changes also delayed the court case because iiNet was awarded more time to amend their defence.

== Arguments ==
The applicants, who were represented by Tony Bannon SC, started by arguing that iiNet was failing to enforce its own user agreements which stipulated that users were not to illegally download files. Early in the proceedings Bannon claimed that "there were 94,942 instances of iiNet customers making available online unauthorised copies" of movies during a 59-week period from 23 June 2008.

On day three it was revealed that iiNet received 1,356 notices requesting "takedown" action against customers, from various sources in a one-week period in early December 2008. General counsel for iiNet Richard Cobden argued that "Acting on [all these] notifications is simply unreasonable and burdensome and inappropriate".

== Judgement ==
The trial judge, Justice Cowdroy of the Federal Court, found in favour of iiNet, dismissing the case with costs. The court found that AFACT had misled the court in regard to the number of infringing users, and, while iiNet users did infringe, this was not the responsibility of iiNet to deal with:

iiNet is not responsible if an iiNet user uses that system to bring about copyright infringement ... the law recognises no positive obligation on any person to protect the copyright of another

It was also found that iiNet had in place an "anti-piracy policy" and while that was not up to the standards demanded of them by AFACT, it was considered acceptable to the court that iiNet did not authorise copyright infringing activities on their network.

Justice Cowdroy found that the provision of internet access by iiNet was not the "means" of infringement. Rather, the "means" was the exploitation of BitTorrent, which iiNet had no control over, in a deliberate manner to infringe copyright. Justice Cowdroy determined that iiNet did not have adequate power to prevent users from performing unlawful downloads and had not sanctioned, approved or countenanced copyright infringement. Since iiNet does not have control over the BitTorrent network, and the ISP Safe Harbour provisions apply, iiNet could not be held responsible for anything done by its users on the network.

== Additional comments ==
One of iiNet's witnesses in the case was iiNet Managing Director and CEO, Michael Malone. Justice Cowdroy was invited by the applicants to find that Malone was not a credible witness, being neither truthful nor reliable. In a sharp rejection of this submission, Justice Cowdroy held (at 132–133):

132. The applicants have mounted a vigorous challenge to the credibility of Mr Malone, asserting that he was neither a truthful nor reliable witness. It has been submitted that the Court should not rely on his evidence except where it is against his interests or it is independently corroborated. It is submitted that Mr Malone was determined to advocate the respondent's cause at every opportunity and where he sensed a conflict between that cause and the truth, he was prepared to subordinate the latter in favour of the former.

133. The Court rejects the attack on the credit of Mr Malone. Mr Malone was an impressive witness who remained consistent (for the most part) in the evidence he gave during three days of gruelling and unnecessarily hostile cross-examination.

== Consequences ==
As a result of this outcome, the court has set a precedent stating that ISPs are not responsible for what their users do with the services the ISPs provide them. Costs for the trial were awarded to iiNet as part of the ruling. AFACT has previously indicated it will appeal an adverse judgment. It was believed that this ruling will have substantial ramifications internationally in regards to dealing with copyright infringers on an ISP level.

In a statement released by the executive director of AFACT, Neil Gain, the copyright organization has 21 days to appeal the judgement. However, they are looking towards lobbying the government instead to have laws change to place responsibility for copyright protection in the hands of the ISPs themselves. Sabiene Heindl, the general manager for the copyright enforcement arm of the music industry, MIPI, has stated that as a result of this case, MIPI has no choice but to sue individual copyright infringers directly.

It was believed that the government, in particular then Prime Minister Kevin Rudd and Communications Minister Stephen Conroy would attempt to introduce legislation into parliament to modify laws regarding this case to prevent ISPs from using the safe harbour provisions as an excuse to avoid protecting copyright. However, Conroy released a statement saying that he has no plans to push for such an amendment and for ISPs and AFACT to have a "mature" approach to dealing with copyright enforcement.

== Appeal to the Full Court of the Federal Court ==
AFACT appealed to the full bench of the Federal Court, and was dismissed on 24 February 2011. The majority of the Full Court stated that liability was not established as the copyright owners had not provided sufficient information and verification to support their allegations.

Justices Emmett and Nicholas found that iiNet had not authorised the infringement of copyright, with Justice Jagot dissenting. However Justice Emmett made additional comment:

While the evidence supports a conclusion that iiNet demonstrated a dismissive and, indeed, contumelious, attitude to the complaints of infringement by the use of its services, its conduct did not amount to authorisation of the primary acts of infringement on the part of iiNet users.

Since the decision has been released, notable Australian intellectual property law academics David Brennan, and Kimberlee Weatherall have suggested the outcome is not very favourable for ISPs.

Key findings which were established in the appellant court were:

- Justice Emmett, and Justice Jagot, found that ISPs can be found liable for authorising their users for infringement under specific circumstances.
- Account holders were liable for infringements on the customer account in the context of disconnection due to repeat copyright infringement. [s 116AH, item 1]
- ISPs were not afforded protection under the Telecommunications Act
- 112E of the Copyright Act 1968 (known colloquially as the facilities defense), and one which equated an ISP to Australia Post and often cited by groups such as the Internet Industry Association and other supporters was found by the trial judge and all three appellant judges as not a valid defense.
- All three appellant justices, found that iiNet would not have been afforded protection under the "Safe Harbours" negotiated in the copyright act, as they did not have a policy to deal which allowed for termination of repeat infringers in appropriate circumstances.

The Full Court's judgement was followed by negotiations for legislative and industry-based solutions to resolve the issue of online copyright infringement, but these had not reached a conclusion by the time of the subsequent High Court appeal decision in 2012.

=== Authorisation of infringement ===
==== Joint judgement ====
Two judges (Justices Emmett and Nicholas) upheld Justice Cowdroy's conclusion that iiNet did not authorise copyright infringement, however, their reasoning differed from that of Justice Cowdroy. The joint judgement decided that although iiNet showed an indifferent attitude to the film companies' complaints and requests, iiNet's inaction did not indicate an authorisation of primary acts of copyright infringement. The majority found that iiNet had the technical power to prevent infringement activities by suspending or terminating relevant user accounts. It was recognized that iiNet had a technical and contractual relationship with users whereby each user had agreed not to use the internet service to infringe copyright.

The majority held that it was unreasonable for iiNet to act on AFACT's request for iiNet to suspend or terminate certain services given that AFACT had not provided sufficiently credible, verifiable and cogent evidence. Justices Emmett and Nicholas accepted iiNet's argument that the data sent by AFACT required extensive analysis in order to identify allegedly infringing users and to obtain details of infringement activities. It was acknowledged that such extensive analysis would be onerous to iiNet, and hence unnecessary for iiNet to engage in.

==== Jagot J ====
Justice Jagot inferred that iiNet was liable for authorising primary infringements. Justice Jagot established her conclusion on certain findings including that iiNet knew a considerable proportion of BitTorrent traffic involved copyright infringement. Her Honour held that:

iiNet had a range of measures available to it, including warning customers, blocking sites or ports, and suspending or terminating the account of a customer whose account was found to have been involved in infringements of copyright. It was possible to warn a customer that an infringement, by use of the service provided to that customer, had been detected.

Justice Jagot held that AFACT supplied iiNet with credible evidence of extensive and repeated infringements, contrasting the findings of the majority. Justice Jagot considered that iiNet regularly identified its users in distinction to their IP addresses in several contexts including when users did not pay service charges.

=== Facilitators of communications ===
iiNet relied on Section 112E of the Australian Copyright Act 1968, to argue that it merely provided the facilities which its users have allegedly exploited to infringe copyright. Following Cooper v Universal Music, the majority decided that under section 112E the mere provision of communications facilities do not, by themselves, identify the ISP as an authoriser of infringement. The majority held that if authorisation had occurred, section 112E did not constitute an acceptable defence for iiNet.

=== Telecommunications Act defence ===
iiNet claimed that under section 276 of the Telecommunications Act 1997 (Cth), which prevents the disclosure and use of protected information, prohibited it from taking action on AFACT's notices. The Full Court rejected this argument as statutory exceptions would apply.

=== Limitation on remedies ===
The "safe harbour provisions" in Part V, Division 2AA of the Copyright Act limits remedies available against ISPs for copyright infringement on their networks. The Full Court rejected Justice Cowdroy's statement that iiNet internal policy was a "repeat infringer policy". The decision was based on the fact iiNet did not develop processes to establish the policy, nor notify its users about the policy. The majority held that if authorisation occurred, iiNet was not protected by the "safe harbour" provisions.

=== Reaction to the appeal judgement ===
==== Significance ====
The Full Court expressed that ISPs should be "cautious" before acting on detailed information provided by other parties apart from the party to the customer relationship agreement (CRA) where notices produced are above the quality of unreliable allegations of copyright infringement. Justice Emmett suggested that if copyright owners were to pursue ISPs for authorising infringement, they would need to show the following conditions were accepted:

- "iiNet has been provided with unequivocal and cogent evidence of the alleged primary acts of infringement by use of the iiNet service in question"; and
- to reimburse iiNet for the reasonable cost of verifying the particulars of the primary acts of infringement alleged and of establishing and maintaining [an infringement monitoring regime]; and
- to indemnify iiNet in respect of any liability reasonably incurred by iiNet as a consequence of mistakenly suspending or terminating a service on the basis of allegations made by the Copyright Owner."

==== ISP response ====
Following the ruling, several major Australian ISPs have refined their approach to copyright infringement warnings. Exetel has revised their policy of blocking Internet access, of users who receive infringement notices, until the organization receives an acknowledgment that the infringement was received by the end user. Instead, Exetel will now simply forward the infringement notice to the end user and not interfere with their connection. Optus, Australia's second largest ISP has provided a similar modification in their copyright policing, claiming they will not reprimand or otherwise penalise users who perform copyright infringement on their networks as well.

==== Industry copyright code for ISPs ====
The AFACT has welcomed the Internet Industry Association's (IIA) development of an industry code of practice to guide courts on what actions internet intermediaries (such as ISPs or other content hosts) should undertake in response to copyright infringement claims. The IIA has also announced it will seek reform to Australian copyright law to extend certain existing ISP "safe harbour" protections to apply to other intermediaries such as search engine providers and networking websites.

==== Leaked diplomatic cable ====
In August 2011, a leaked diplomatic cable sent from the US Embassy in Canberra (under the name of then-US Ambassador Robert McCallum) to several US Government diplomatic branches on 30 November 2010, disclosed further details of the 'Roadshow Films Pty Limited v iiNet Limited' case. The cable, examined by Delimiter, states that although the case against iiNet was registered by Australian and US content owners and distributors, the prime mover behind it was the Motion Picture Association of America (MPAA), an active participant in copyright enforcement in the US.

== Appeal to the High Court ==
On 24 March 2011, AFACT announced that it had sought leave to appeal the Full Court's verdict to the High Court of Australia. The application for special leave was approved, and the hearing was held from 30 November to 2 December 2011.

The appeal addressed whether the Full Federal Court deviated in its application of the principles of authorisation and subsequently, whether the finding that iiNet did not authorise its users' copyright infringements is incorrect. The appeal also focused on whether the Full Court erred in its treatment of the amount of knowledge iiNet required to know before infringement could be validated.

In a judgment on 20 April 2012, the High Court unanimously dismissed AFACT's appeal and ordered AFACT to pay costs, with iiNet's gross legal expenses said to be approximately $9 million. The High Court confirmed the Federal Court Full Bench decision affirming the first instance decision of Cowdroy, though not supporting all his reasons. The court held that "... it could not be inferred from iiNet's inactivity after receiving the AFACT notices that iiNet had authorised any act of infringement of copyright in the appellants' films by its customers."

The appellants, having failed three times, are widely expected to lobby for legislative changes to the Copyright Act 1968 to reverse the effect of this ruling.

== See also ==
- Internet in Australia
