= Access Copyright =

Canadian organization

The Canadian Copyright Licensing Agency (formerly Cancopy), operating as Access Copyright is a Canadian not-for-profit copyright collective. It collects revenues from licensed Canadian businesses, government, schools, libraries, and other copyright users for the photocopying of print works and distributes those monies to the rightsholders, such as publishers and authors from Canada and around the world.

Access Copyright covers works published in Australia, Argentina, Canada, Denmark, France, Germany, Greece, Hong Kong, Iceland, Ireland, Italy, Liechtenstein, Malta, the Netherlands, New Zealand, Norway, South Africa, Singapore, Spain, Switzerland, United Kingdom, and the United States.

== University model licence ==
When universities sign on to a licence with Access Copyright (negotiated by the Association of Universities and Colleges of Canada (AUCC) or the Association of Canadian Community Colleges), their professors and students are given permission to do certain copying of copyrighted works. The university is generally charged a base rate per full-time student for this licence, usually passed down to students in the form of mandatory fees. 2011 AUCC model licence A new model, negotiated by AUCC in 2011, would see universities pay a rate of $26 per full-time student. The old agreement, which expired in 2010, charged only $3.38 plus an additional 10 cents per page coursepacks, photocopied compilations of readings designed by instructors and sold to students. Moreover, additional stipulations would proscribe faculty and students from keeping copies of journal articles in personal libraries, or on personal computers or email accounts.

These changes have proved controversial, and numerous universities have opted out of the deal.

Universities that have opted out:

- Athabasca University
- Brock University
- Carleton University
- MacEwan University
- McMaster University
- Memorial University
- Mount Allison University
- Mount Royal University
- Queen's University
- Toronto Metropolitan University (formerly Ryerson Univ.)
- University of Alberta
- University of British Columbia
- University of Calgary
- University of New Brunswick
- University of Ottawa
- University of Saskatchewan
- University of Toronto
- University of Victoria
- University of Manitoba
- University of Northern British Columbia
- University of Waterloo
- University of Western Ontario
- University of Windsor
- University of Winnipeg
- York University

Universities that have signed on:

== Controversy ==
In 2012, Access Copyright started charging universities for e-mailing links to copyrighted information, even in cases where there was no copyrighted material present. They charge a full price for each link e-mailed.

In late 2019, Access Copyright obtained a court order requiring 300 schools across Canada to supply handouts and lesson plans from the last seven years. The demand, intended to find use of copyright material, was described as a "logistical nightmare."

== See also ==
- Copyright Clearance Center
- Captain Copyright
- Alberta (Education) v Canadian Copyright Licensing Agency (Access Copyright)
