= Microsoft Corp. v. Zamos =

Microsoft Corp v. Zamos was litigation between Microsoft and David Zamos, a student at Kent State and the University of Akron in the United States. Microsoft accused Zamos of illegally reselling his student-discounted copies of Windows XP Pro and Microsoft Office on eBay. Zamos countersued Microsoft for making false claims. When Zamos sent a press release to his local newspaper, the case received international press coverage.

The issue was that Zamos acquired Microsoft software at a discount for academic use, then re-sold it to the general public on eBay for a profit. Zamos contends, and can document, that he found the software unsuitable when he realized it required him to format his computer's hard drive. He attempted to return the software, first at the University of Akron's bookstore, then directly to Microsoft.

When both of these attempted returns were denied, Zamos put the software up for sale on eBay in two auctions, the second of which was cancelled at Microsoft's request. When he successfully re-instated the auction and completed the sale, he was sued under the Digital Millennium Copyright Act. His profit was $143.50 USD.

On January 3, 2005 Zamos filed a countersuit. In it he pointed out that Microsoft's claim did not represent the facts of his case, and appeared to be a boilerplate suit like thousands of others the company has filed. He exhibited a page from the claim that was identical to a page in another, except that some plural words had been changed to singular ones. The respective verbs had not been changed to their singular forms, so the page contained grammatical errors.

These counterclaims seem to have failed, as Zamos was not a "qualified end user". So he filed more claims, contending among other things that the unopened software had never presented him with the End User License Agreement and thus the opportunity to become a qualified end user. This, he asserted, amounted to deceptive sales practice.

When Zamos requested a trial by jury, Microsoft offered to drop their case if he would drop his countersuit. But he insisted on reimbursement for the cost of copying legal documents, and an apology for Microsoft's behavior. Microsoft refused this, and Zamos wrote a brief press release to the Akron Beacon Journal, which published the item on March 7, 2005.

Over the course of a single day, this item attracted so much interest that Zamos immediately received requests for interviews from all over the United States and the United Kingdom. Microsoft quickly proposed a different settlement, and Zamos agreed. As part of this settlement, Zamos has agreed not to discuss the case further.

== See also ==
- First-sale doctrine
