= Adam Internet =

Australian telecommunications company

- Type: Subsidiary
- Industry: Telecommunications
- Founded: 1992
- Fate: Integrated into iiNet
- Headquarters: Adelaide, South Australia
- Products: Broadband; Dialup; Colocation; Data Centre; Webhosting; VoIP; Cloud; WiMAX
- Number of employees: 180 est. (2012)
- Parent: iiNet
- Website: www.adam.com.au

Adam Internet was an Australian Internet service provider (ISP) that serviced residents, businesses and government departments primarily within South Australia.

== Background ==
Originally founded in 1986 as the Adelaide Amiga Club, Adam Internet grew out of the bulletin board system of the Adelaide Amiga User Group. The bulletin board was set up in 1987 and was originally run by the user group but was co-opted by its sysop, Greg Hicks. In 1989, it transformed into a commercial multi-line TBBS-based bulletin board, which, at the time, was the largest bulletin board system in the Southern Hemisphere and for many years was the most popular in Australia. With 100 staff members and a customer base of over 80,000 in 2009, Adam Internet held 35% of South Australia's Internet market.

Adam Internet provided a range of separately metered services at no extra charge. Some of these services were operated by Adam directly, such as a gaming community (3FL, which operated a range of servers for various games), ABC iView, and file servers (FileArena, which hosted a large file repository including games, Linux distributions, streaming of various radio stations including local youth radio station Fresh 92.7, and a Tucows mirror).

In August 2012, Adam Internet announced that their managing director, Scott Hicks, would be leaving the company.

In August 2013, Adam Internet signed a deal for takeover by iiNet. In December 2015, Adam Internet was disbanded, with services and existing customers being moved to iiNet.

== Milestones ==
- Adam Internet launches the AdamMax network, a WiMAX product: November 2009 in an Australian first, local provider Adam internet has secured a $3 million contract with the State Government to eliminate blackspots in the metropolitan area.
