= Captain Copyright =

Cartoon character

Captain Copyright

Captain Copyright is a propaganda cartoon character created by Canada's Access Copyright agency in 2006 to educate children about the agency's stance on copyright and copyright infringement. As of August 18, 2006, the Captain Copyright initiative had been canceled.

As of March 3, 2007, the website has a three-paragraph statement explaining that "we have come to the conclusion that the current climate around copyright issues will not allow a project like this one to be successful".

As of March 14, 2008, the website gives a 400 Bad Request, stating "Bad Request (Invalid Hostname)".

As of January 11, 2013, the website redirects to Access Copyright's main site.

== Controversy ==
Not long after the launch of a website introducing the character, concerns were raised in a number of quarters that the character was not appropriate for educational uses, as it was produced by an entity with a commercial interest in the state of copyright law in Canada, and it is unclear that it is following copyright law itself.

For example, it was reported that the Captain Copyright web page used two quotes about ISBNs from English Wikipedia, but fails to follow the requirements of English Wikipedia's GNU FDL license by providing a direct link back to the source article or even acknowledging the GNU license as required by English Wikipedia. On further investigation, several more English Wikipedia quotes were also found on the site; however, as of 5 June 2006, all the English Wikipedia quotes were removed, and Suzanne Dugard, manager of communications for Access Copyright, stated in an interview with Canada.com that their inclusion had been "just an oversight".

It has also been noted that the site avoids the issue of the blank media levy in Canada when discussing the legalities of space shifting and downloading copyrighted material without permission. While it is illegal to make such material available for download, as of 2006 the Copyright Board of Canada has indicated that it is not illegal to download copyrighted material once it has been made available illegally, a ruling made specifically because of the earlier imposition of the levy. For example, a teacher's handout claims that for music "the copyright is for the recording on the media device, not the words or music on it," even though the intent of the blank media levy is to compensate copyright holders in return for allowing the shifting of the copyrighted material from media to media.

Others have pointed out that Access Copyright has placed the following two statements on the Captain Copyright website:

permission to link is explicitly withheld from any website the contents of which may, in the opinion of the Access Copyright, be damaging or cause harm to the reputation of, Access Copyright

You are not permitted to copy or cut from any page or its HTML source code to the Windows [TM] clipboard (or equivalent on other platforms) onto any other website.

In both cases, it has been questioned whether or not these clauses — unusual for HTML documents, which are intended to be hyperlinked to by the structure of web itself — are intended to stifle fair dealing, debate on copyright issues, and legitimate criticism of Access Copyright's approach despite Captain Copyright being pitched as a tool for education.
