= Westnet =

Defunct Australian telecommunications company

Westnet Pty Ltd
- Type: Subsidiary
- Industry: Telecommunications
- Founded: Geraldton, Western Australia (1994)
- Headquarters: Perth, Western Australia
- Products: Broadband; Satellite Broadband; Dial-up; Telephony; Web Hosting
- Number of employees: 450 (2013)
- Parent: TPG
- Website: www.westnet.com.au

Westnet was a Perth-based Australian telecommunications company providing broadband ADSL, broadband ADSL2+, satellite broadband, dialup Internet, telephony and web-hosting services to homes and businesses across Australia.

== History ==
Founded in the Western Australian city of Geraldton in 1994 by Chris and Rhonda Thomas, Westnet began in a spare bedroom. In 1996 it was purchased by local company Mitchell and Brown Communications and experienced rapid growth over the years as a local internet service provider to the Geraldton region. With this expansion came the necessity of larger premises, which saw Westnet relocate to St Martins Tower in Perth in 1999.

Westnet completed the move to new premises in Central Park Tower, Perth. The move was in response to continued growth, and requirements for expanded office space for staff and resources.

In 2004, Westnet began offering a telephone service in addition to its internet products. At this time, the company began referring to itself as a telecommunications service provider, rather than only an internet service provider.

== Acquisition by iiNet ==
On 8 May 2008 Western Australian based internet service provider iiNet acquired Westnet for $81 million. The two companies continue to trade separately, but share many functions.

In March 2015 iiNet was bought by TPG in a $1.4 billion deal, effectively making TPG the parent company of Westnet.

In December 2023, Westnet announced that it would cease accepting new customers to the Westnet brand, and that all existing residential Westnet customers will be migrated to the iiNet brand.

== Bandwidth management ==
=== P2P deprioritisation ===
In June 2007, Westnet stated that it had been "trialling" traffic prioritisation for a year, deprioritising peer-to-peer traffic, and would be continuing to do so in future. The announcement was made on the Westnet Blog and on Whirlpool.net.au, to mixed reactions. Some praised Westnet for openly declaring its use of prioritisation, while others (including a Whirlpool News editorial) criticised the company for using it silently for a year, or for doing so at all. Whirlpool News's article also suggested that the admission followed assertions by competing ISP Exetel that it was not the only ISP restricting peer-to-peer traffic.

== Awards ==
Westnet has won the following awards:

- 2008 Customer Service Institute of Australia – National Medium Business of the Year
- 2008 Customer Service Institute of Australia – Excellence in a Contact Centre (WA)
- 16th and 17th ACNielsen Consult Australian Online Survey
- Best ISP – PC Authority Reliability and Service Awards 2007, 2008

== See also ==
- Internet in Australia
