= TPG Telecom =

Australian telecommunications company

TPG Telecom Limited
- Formerly: Total Peripherals Group
- Type: Public
- Traded as: ASX: TPG
- Industry: Telecommunications
- Predecessors: AAPT; Hutchison Telecommunications; SP Telecom; Total Peripherals Group; Vodafone Hutchinson Australia; Vodafone Australia
- Founded: 2009; 17 years ago
- Headquarters: Level 27, Tower Two, International Towers Sydney, 200 Barangaroo Avenue, Barangaroo, New South Wales, Australia
- Key people: Iñaki Berroeta (CEO); Canning Fok (chairman)
- Products: Prepaid and postpaid mobile phones, fixed-line and wireless broadband
- Brands: TPG; iiNet; Vodafone Australia; Lebara; Felix Mobile
- Revenue: ▲ A$5.3 billion (2021)
- Net income: ▲ A$734 million (2020)
- Owner: Hutchison Telecommunications (Australia) Limited (23.98%, 87.865%-owned, indirectly, by CK Hutchison Holdings Limited); Vodafone International Operations Limited (23.98%, wholly owned, indirectly, by Vodafone Group plc); Soul Patts, Second Services Company Pty Ltd (12.78%)
- Number of employees: 6,000 (2022)
- Website: www.tpgtelecom.com.au

TPG Telecom Limited, formerly Vodafone Hutchison Australia and renamed following a merger with TPG, is an Australian telecommunications company. It is the second-largest telecommunications company listed on the Australian Securities Exchange. TPG Telecom is the third-largest wireless carrier in Australia, with 5.8 million subscribers as of 2020.

TPG Telecom is the parent company of several Australian internet retail brands including Vodafone, TPG, iiNet, Lebara and Felix. TPG Telecom owns and operates nationwide fixed and mobile network infrastructure, including Australia's second-largest fixed voice and data network, with more than 27,000 kilometres of metropolitan and inter-capital fibre.

TPG has a 4G mobile network covering 99% of the Australian population and a 5G mobile network which covers over 85% of the Australian population, largely in part due to the Optus MOCN agreement which saw TPG gain access to 2,444 Optus mobile sites.

== History ==
TPG Telecom was previously known as Vodafone Hutchison Australia (VHA). VHA was majority owned by Hutchison Telecommunications (Australia), a listed company of CK Hutchison Holdings group and Vodafone. Vodafone Hutchison Australia was formed by a merger of Vodafone Australia and Hutchison Australia's 3 in 2009. VHA started to phase out the 3 brand in 2011.

A merger of TPG and Vodafone Hutchison Australia was officially announced on 30 August 2018. Initially rejected by the Australian Competition & Consumer Commission (ACCC), the plan was given permission to proceed via a February 2020 Federal Court of Australia ruling. On 30 June 2020, VHA received a listing on the Australian Securities Exchange. The newly listed company then merged with TPG Corporation, previously known as TPG Telecom on 13 July 2020.

TPG Telecom has a 27,000+-kilometre inter-capital and metropolitan fibre network and is also the second-largest data and fixed-voice network in Australia. It has an international system of connecting subsea cables to major hubs in Asia and North America from Australia.

In November 2020, TPG Telecom launched the Felix mobile brand.

On 14 October 2024 Vocus Group announced their intention to acquire TPG’s Enterprise, Government and Wholesale (EG&W) fixed business and fibre network assets for $5.25 billion this includes the AAPT and Vision Network Assets. Vocus Group finalized its $5.25 billion acquisition of TPG Telecom's EG&W Assets at the end of July 2025.

=== Network sharing proposal ===
On 21 February 2022, TPG Telecom announced a proposed network sharing (MOCN) deal with Telstra, which would see TPG gain access to approximately 3,700 Telstra mobile base stations in regional Australia, and Telstra being authorised to use TPG's mobile spectrum in these regional areas. Under the deal, 725 of TPG's mobile sites would be decommissioned, and another 169 of their sites would be used to deploy Telstra infrastructure. The deal was described as being mutually beneficial for both TPG, who would see an increase in mobile coverage area, and Telstra, who would gain access to more spectrum to relieve congestion on their network. The deal was strongly opposed by its market competitor Optus, who argued that the approval of the deal would cement Telstra's position as the monopoly mobile operator in regional areas, stifle competition, and increase prices.

In December 2022, the ACCC denied the network sharing proposal, based on its impact on market competition. The decision was appealed by Telstra and TPG, but the ACCC's decision was reaffirmed in mid-2023. The two parties stated they would consider their options including further appeals. Some public commentary suggested it would be unprofitable for Optus to invest in regional internet infrastructure even without Telstra and TPG utilising market power.

== Brands ==
Several internet and mobile brands are operated by TPG Telecom including TPG, Vodafone, iiNet, Internode, Lebara and Felix.
