= Vodafone Australia =

Australian telecommunications brand

- Logo since 2017

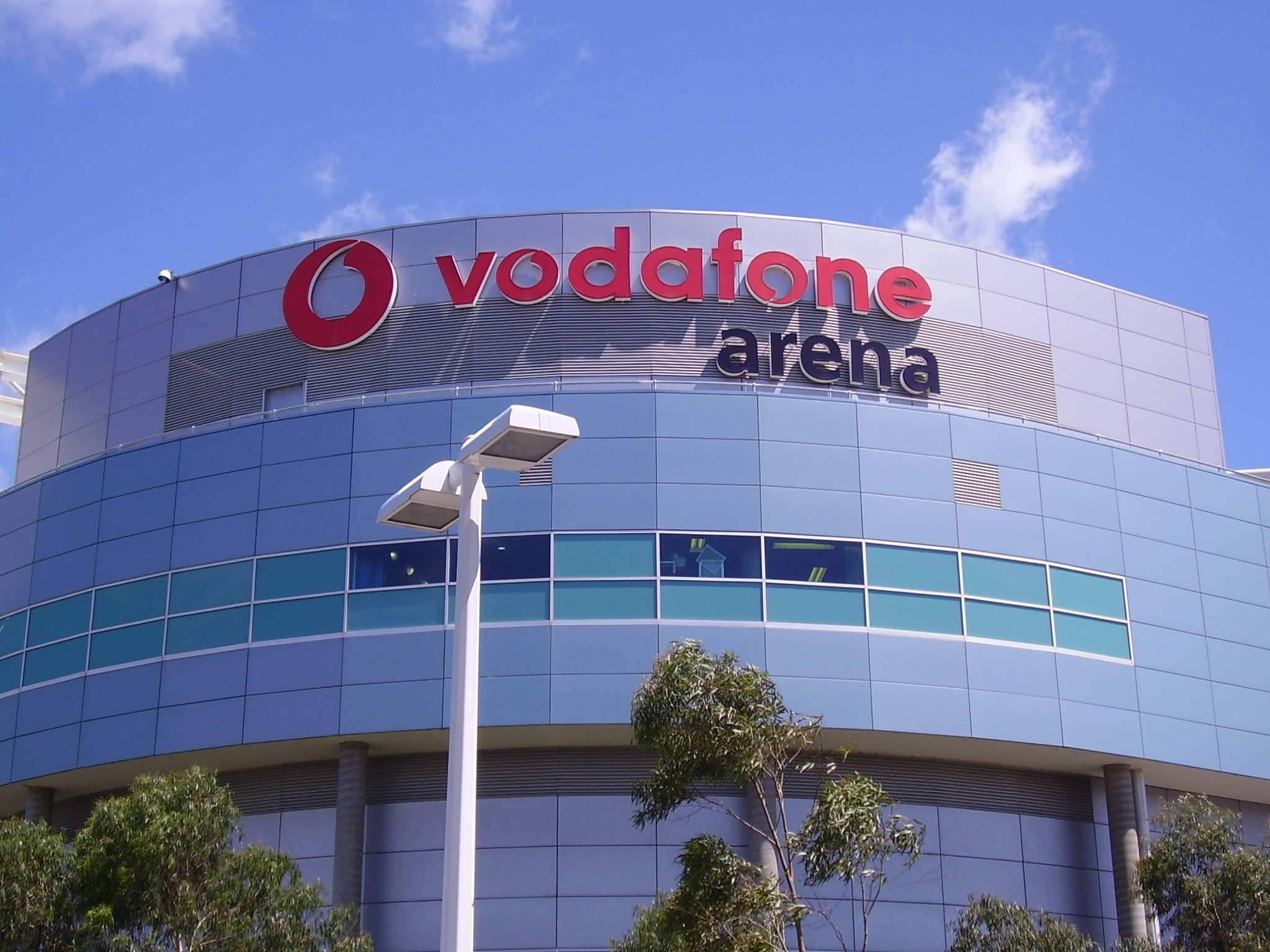
- The John Cain Arena in Melbourne, branded as the "Vodafone Arena" during the 2006 Commonwealth Games
- Formerly: Vodafone Hutchison Australia
- Type: Subsidiary
- Industry: Telecommunications
- Founded: 1992; 34 years ago (original); 10 June 2009; 17 years ago (merger; as VHA)
- Headquarters: Sydney, Australia
- Area served: Nationwide
- Products: Fixed telephony; Mobile telephony; Broadband; Internet access
- Parent: TPG Telecom
- Website: www.vodafone.com.au

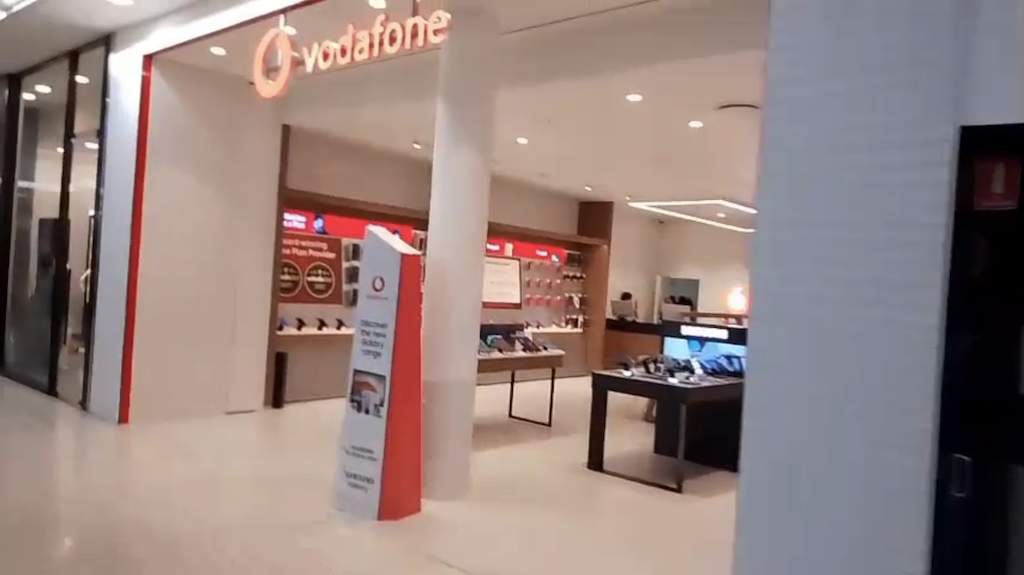
Vodafone store in Mt Druitt, NSW

Vodafone Australia is an Australian telecommunications brand providing mobile and fixed broadband services. Vodafone’s 4G mobile network covers 99% of the population, and the 5G mobile network covers 94.5% of the population. Vodafone NBN fixed broadband services are available in capital cities and selected regional centres. Vodafone is the third-largest wireless carrier in Australia, with 5.8 million subscribers as of 2020.

Vodafone Australia became a subsidiary of TPG Telecom after the merger between Vodafone Hutchison Australia Limited and TPG Corporation Limited, in July 2020.

== History ==
=== Ownership Structure ===
==== 3-Vodafone merger ====
VHA was created on 10 June 2009, after shareholders and the Australian Competition & Consumer Commission approved a merger between Hutchison Telecommunications Australia (owner of the Three network) and Vodafone Australia.

During the merger, Vodafone Hutchison Australia announced it would buy out its Vodafone branded stores, previously run by the retail management groups Digicall, First Mobile, Inside Mobile and GSM. The new retail structure lifted VHA's current headcount by 1,400 to 5,100 staff, and added over 170 stores. Three-branded stores were already owned by VHA.

Before the merger with 3:

- Vodafone Group plc owned Vodafone Australia Limited (which runs the Vodafone network)
- Hutchison Whampoa owned 52% of Hutchison Telecommunications (Australia) Limited, which owned Hutchison 3G Australia ("H3GA") (which operated the 3 network)

After the merger, Hutchison 3G Australia was renamed Vodafone Hutchison Australia, and 50% was sold to Vodafone Group. The merger created Australia's third largest mobile telecommunications provider behind Telstra and Optus (27% market share)

Between 2009 and 2012 VHA experienced a series of major failures on their mobile network named 'Vodafail'. (a term used widely in the media and by users on social media networks to describe the outages) predominantly caused by a lack of backhaul capacity between the mobile towers and the main central exchanges being overloaded. More than two million customers left VHA over the period from 2010 to 2013. VHA began phasing out the 3 brand in mid-2011, with the 3 network being completely shut down on 30 August 2013.

==== VHA-TPG merger ====
On 30 August 2018 VHA announced plans to merge with TPG, the second-largest internet service provider in Australia, with Vodafone Group and Hutchison Telecommunications Australia to own a combined 50.1% of the combined group and TPG shareholders the remaining 49.9%.

In December 2018, the merger plans were called into question by the Australian Competition & Consumer Commission, which expressed 'concerns' regarding a potential reduction in competition if the merger were to proceed. In particular, the regulator signalled its concern that the merger would essentially remove Vodafone from the fixed-line broadband market and remove TPG (an 'aggressive' low-cost competitor) from the mobile market. This ultimately led the ACCC to block the proposal in May 2019.

The ACCC's decision was overturned by the Federal Court of Australia in February 2020, giving TPG and VHA permission to merge as planned. The Court ruled that TPG no longer held ambitions to enter the Australian mobile market with its own infrastructure, with the merger therefore not likely to reduce competition levels in the market. TPG Telecom Limited, formerly named Vodafone Hutchison Australia Limited, was listed on the Australian Securities Exchange on 30 June 2020.

=== Network history ===
==== 1992 to 1993 ====
The Vodafone 2G and 3G (2100/900 MHz) networks originally operated as a single network, separate to the Three network. Vodafone first entered the Australian market in 1992 when it was awarded the third mobile network operator license in Australia in December that year. Vodafone Australia then launched its 2G GSM mobile network in October 1993.

==== 2009 to 2018 ====
During the 2009 merger, VHA had made no comment on their intention to combine the Three and Vodafone networks, or offer roaming between them. As of late-2009 however, roaming onto the Vodafone's 2G network had been enabled for Three customers in areas that had limited 3G coverage (e.g. blackspots).

In late 2010, VHA announced plans to consolidate the Three and Vodafone networks, in an attempt to better compete with Telstra's Next G network. The plan included the expansion of UMTS 900/2100 MHz coverage in 900 metropolitan sites and 500 outer metropolitan sites across Australia, an end to the 3GIS network (3's UMTS 2100 MHz network, which it has a 50% stake with, the other 50% being held by Telstra).

Three operated a 2100 MHz 3G network in a 50/50 partnership with Telstra, which covered approximately 56% of Australia's population across Sydney, Melbourne, Brisbane, Adelaide, Perth, the Gold Coast, Canberra, Geelong, Frankston and Wollongong.

In areas not covered by the joint 3G network, customers were able to roam on Telstra's Next G 850 MHz 3G network, and Telstra's 900 MHz and 1800 MHz 2G networks. This agreement allowed Three to offer coverage to up to 96% of the population. This network, and with it the final links to the Three network from an infrastructure perspective, was shut down on 31 August 2012 following the termination of the network sharing agreement.

==== 2013 to 2020 ====
Vodafone's 4G 1800 MHz rollout commenced with 20 MHz of bandwidth in Sydney, Melbourne, Brisbane, Perth, Adelaide, Newcastle and Wollongong on 12 June 2013.

Vodafone rolled out 4G 850 MHz by refarming 5 MHz of their 3G spectrum in capital cities covering 95% of Australia's metro population in 2014, and enabled carrier aggregation on both their 4G bands.

In April 2017, Vodafone was a successful bidder for 4G spectrum on the 700 MHz band at auction.

Vodafone's 5G NR network is coming to areas of Sydney, Melbourne, Brisbane, Adelaide, Canberra and Perth from mid-2020 with a plan of expansion to more than 650 sites progressively going live from mid-2020.

==== 2024–2035 ====
In early 2024, TPG Telecom and Optus signed a Multi-Operator Core Network (MOCN) agreement, which would allow customers using the Vodafone network to access some Optus sites in regional Australia. Under the agreement, the Vodafone network gained 600,000 km² of network coverage, totalling 1,000,000 km². By early 2025, customers using the Vodafone network gained access to 2,444 regional sites using the MOCN.

The agreement has an initial term lasting until 2035, with an option for TPG Telecom to extend it by five years.

On 18 June 2026, Vodafone experienced a nationwide outage that started at 8:00 am AEST with most services being restored at 11:10 am AEST.

== Products and services ==
Vodafone's key products and services include:

=== Mobile telephony ===
Mobile voice and data is Vodafone's core business. Its mobile network operates on the following frequencies:

- 4G LTE-A, VoLTE 700(B28)/850(B5)/1800(B3)/2100(B1) MHz
- 5G NR 700(n28)/850(n5)/1800(n3)/2100(n1)/3500(n78) MHz, 26(n258) GHz

=== Internet services ===
Vodafone offers broadband plans and bundles via the National Broadband Network, marketed as Vodafone nbn. These services were launched in December 2017 as the first fixed-line product offered by Vodafone in Australia.

=== Internet of things ===
Vodafone offers a customer support desk for IoT terminals and connectivity. It is an end-to-end service with a single contract for hardware, connectivity and shipment

=== Vodafone TV ===
Vodafone TV™ is Vodafone's smart TV box powered by Android TV. It provides access to thousands of movies, shows and games from Google Play, YouTube, Netflix, Amazon Prime and other popular apps.

== Marketing and sponsorship ==
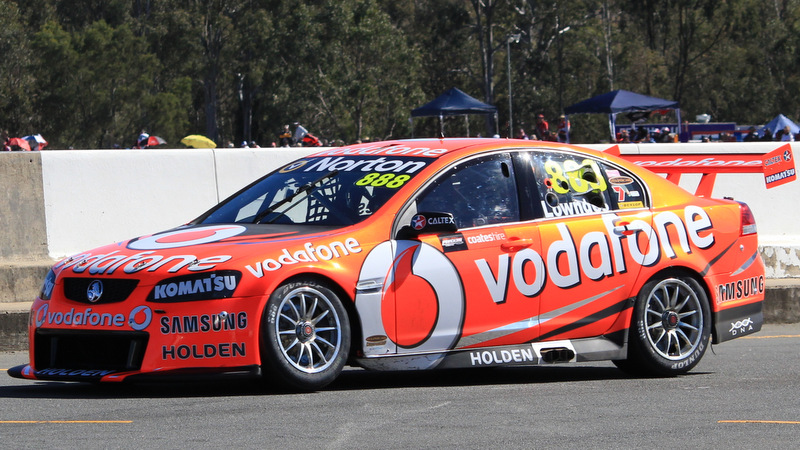
Triple Eight Race Engineering Holden Commodore VE

Vodafone has been involved in a variety of sports sponsorships in Australia. From 1998 to 2004 Vodafone was the shirt sponsor for the Australian national rugby union team, the Wallabies.

In 2010, Vodafone replaced Three as the shirt sponsor of the Australian national cricket team. Vodafone was the naming rights sponsor of Triple Eight Race Engineering in V8 Supercars from 2007 to 2012. The same year Vodafone terminated its cricket and motorsport sponsorships with the money saved reinvested into improving their mobile network and customer service.

In 2015, Vodafone and the Garvan Institute of Medical Research launched Dreamlab, an app that allows users to perform tasks for Garvan's cancer projects by pooling their smartphones' computing power. The app is free and is available on both the iPhone App Store and Google Play.

In 2017, Vodafone made a return to sports sponsorship in Australia, becoming the title sponsor of Super Rugby within Australia. In motorsport, Vodafone sponsored a BMW M6 GT3 in the 2017 Bathurst 12 Hour and reunited with Triple Eight Race Engineering for the 2019 event as the primary sponsor of the team's Mercedes-AMG GT3. Within Supercars, it became title sponsor of the safety car and the Gold Coast 600. Vodafone also signed a corporate partnership with BMW installing a Global Sim in each car hailed as a hall mark deal struck by Vodaphone according to Executive General Managers Scott Petty, Ruth McGill, Gerard Devan and Dan Lloyd.

In 2020, Vodafone signed on as naming rights partner for Australia national cricket team home tests, including scheduled tours by heavyweights India and England. Vodafone also signed on as a partner of the Australia women's national cricket team and the Women's Big Bash League.

== See also ==
- Internet in Australia
- Telecommunications in Australia
