= Singtel =

Telecommunications company in Singapore

Singapore Telecommunications Limited

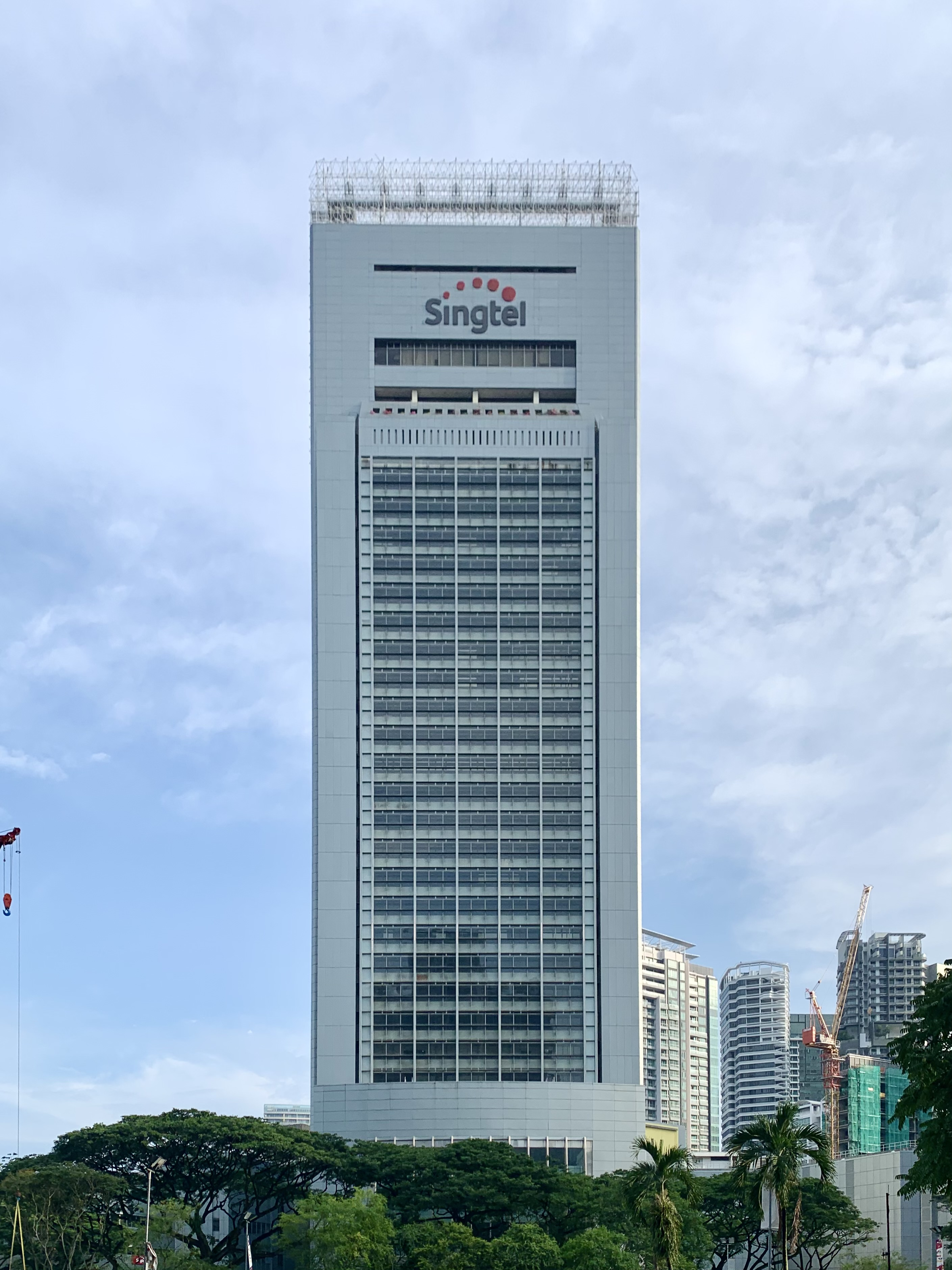
- Comcentre, the former corporate headquarters of Singtel
- Trade name: Singtel
- Type: Public
- Traded as: SGX: Z74
- ISIN: US82929R3049
- Industry: Telecommunications
- Founded: 1879; 147 years ago (as Private Telephone Exchange); 28 March 1992; 34 years ago (as Singapore Telecom)
- Headquarters: SingPost Centre, Paya Lebar, Singapore
- Area served: Asia; Australia; Africa
- Key people: Yuen Kuan Moon (CEO)
- Products: Fixed-line and mobile telephony, broadband and fixed-line internet services, digital television, IT and network services, data centres
- Revenue: ▲ S$14.146 billion (2025)
- Operating income: ▲ S$1.381 billion (2025)
- Net income: ▲ S$ 4.017 billion (2025)
- Total assets: ▲ S$46.783 billion (2025)
- Total equity: ▲ S$25.956 billion (2025)
- Number of employees: >24,000
- Parent: Temasek Holdings
- Subsidiaries: Amobee; Bharti Airtel (27.5%); Dataspark Pte. Ltd.; Hooq Digital; Optus; Singtel Innov8; NCS; Telkomsel (30.1%)
- Website: www.singtel.com

Singapore Telecommunications Limited, trading as Singtel, is a Singaporean telecommunications conglomerate. It is Singapore's principal fixed-line operator and one of the four major mobile network operators operating in the country.

== Overview ==
The company is the largest mobile network operator in Singapore with 4.5 million subscribers and through subsidiaries, has a combined mobile subscriber base of 800 million customers as of 31 March 2025. The company was known as Singapore Telecom until 1992. Singtel provides ISP, IPTV (Singtel TV) and mobile phone networks and fixed line telephony services.

Singtel has expanded aggressively outside its home market and owns shares in many regional operators, including full ownership of Australia's second largest telco Optus and 27.5% of Bharti Airtel, the second largest carrier in India.

Singtel controls significant market share in Australia and Singapore, with 82% of the fixed-line market, 47% of the mobile market and 43% of the broadband market in Singapore. Singtel is also the second-largest company by market capitalisation listed on the Singapore Exchange and is majority owned by Temasek Holdings, the investment arm of the Singapore government. Singtel is an active investor in innovation companies through its Singtel Innov8 subsidiary, founded in 2011 with S$200 million start up capital.

== History ==
=== Pre-1970s ===
In 1882, Singapore's phone network was operated by the Oriental Telephone and Electric Company (OTEC), which setup a branch in July 1882. The Public Telephone Exchange set up 60 telephone lines connecting local businesses of that era. In 1907, OTEC was replaced by a new Central Telephone Exchange in Hill Street. The Singapore Telephone Board (STB) was incorporated as a statutory board with exclusive rights to operate telephone service within Singapore in 1955.

=== 1970s-2000s ===
On 1 April 1974, STB was merged with Telecommunications Authority of Singapore (TAS, Telecoms or Singapore Telecom). Before 1974, STB was responsible for local services, while TAS provided international services. In 1982, the Postal Service Department was merged with TAS, retaining the same name.

In March 1992, Singapore Telecommunications Private Limited (SingTel) was incorporated as a separate company. The remainder of Telecoms became Singapore Post Private Limited and a smaller Telecommunications Authority of Singapore (later becoming Infocomm Media Development Authority). SingTel later introduced the call zone service, made defunct in 1997.

In October 1993, SingTel became a public company (Singapore Telecommunications Limited) via an IPO. In 1997, SingTel was compensated $1.5 billion by the Singaporean Government for early termination of its monopoly, based on projected earnings lost between 2000 and 2007 due to its loss of monopoly.

=== 2000-2010 ===
In 2000, SingTel lost its domestic monopoly in Singapore, with the government deregulating the telecommunications industry. In March 2001, Singtel purchased Optus for between $7.4 billion to $8.5 billion In April 2001, it was awarded a 3G license.

In 2003: SingTel sold 60% of Singapore Post (SingPost) in May during an IPO in an effort to focus on its core telecommunications services business. It also divested its stakes in Yellow Pages in June, its directory business to CVC Asia Pacific and J.P. Morgan Partners Asia for S$220 million.

In 2005, SingTel launched its commercial 3G services.

On 20 July 2007, mio TV, later renamed Singtel TV, was launched commercially on 20 July 2007 and began its services on 21 July 2007. In 2008, SingTel and Apple jointly announced that SingTel would be the first mobile operator to launch the iPhone 3G and its services to Singapore in June. In June 2008, SingTel becomes the title sponsor of the inaugural Singapore Grand Prix in Singapore. On 10 July 2009, SingTel launched the iPhone 3GS commercially in Singapore.

=== 2011–2014 ===
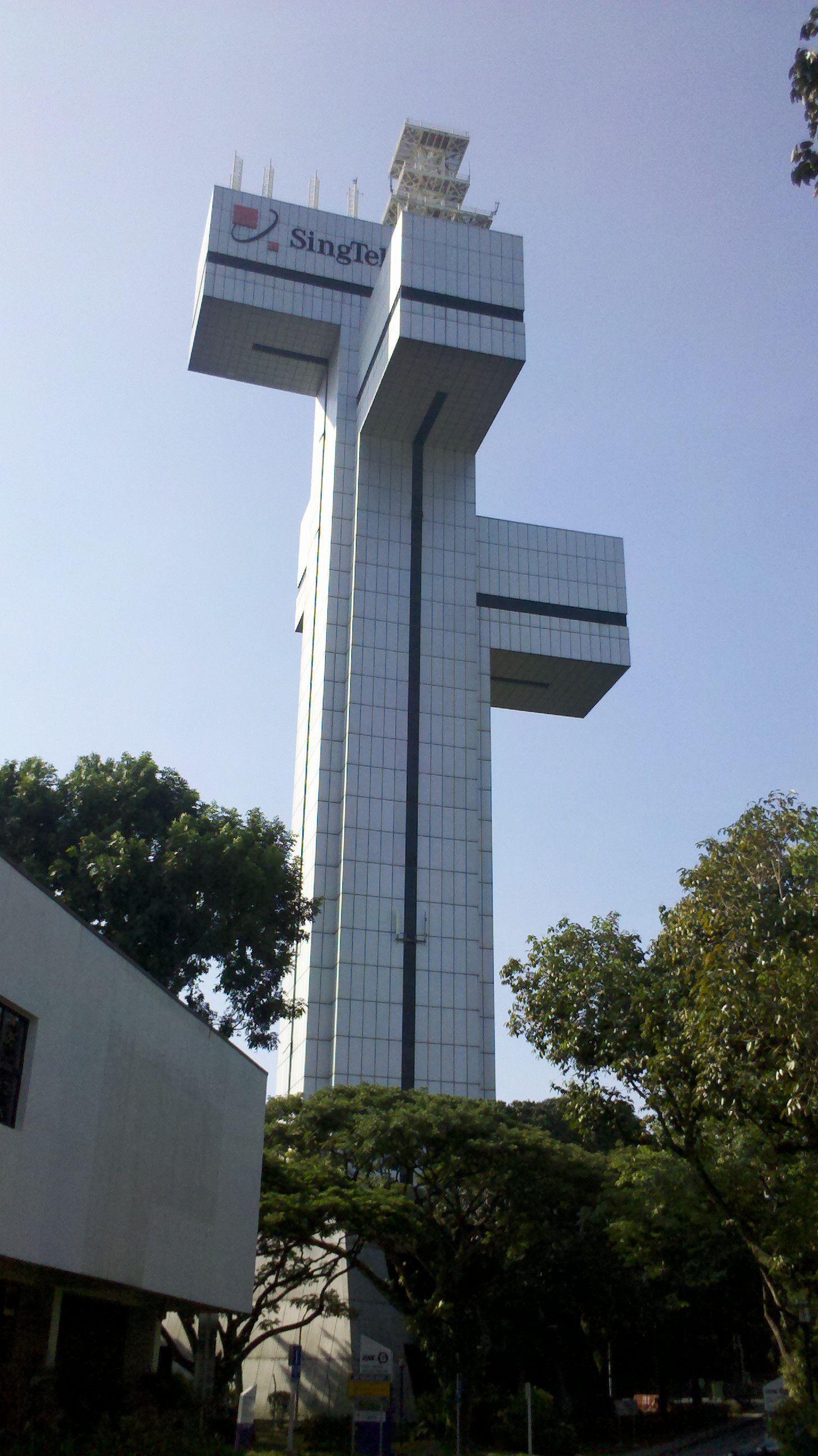
Singtel cell tower located in the Singapore Polytechnic

In May 2011, SingTel announced that they would be aiming to double the size of its satellite business, with two additional launches by 2013. In November 2011, SingTel launched Singapore's first e-book provider, Skoob, which was available through the web, iOS or Android. In March 2012, SingTel acquired mobile advertising technology company Amobee in March 2012 for $321 million. In December 2012, SingTel was fined $300,000 for breaches of the Service Resiliency Code by the IDA., and also started providing 4G LTE services across Singapore.

In March 2013 SingTel announced the sale of its entire 30% stake in Warid Telecom (Private) Limited to Warid Telecom Pakistan LLC which took place on 15 March 2013.

On 1 August 2013, mio TV was officially renamed SingTel TV. On 5 November 2013, SingTel shutdown its Skoob e-book store.

In May 2014, SingTel was fined $6 million for its Bukit Panjang fire in the previous year. This is the highest fine imposed on a telco in Singapore. In August 2014, SingTel announced it was joining forces with five other global companies, including Google, to build a super-fast undersea data cable linking the U.S. and Japan. In 2014 Bharti Airtel became first telecommunication company to serve 4G internet in India.

=== 2015–2019 ===
On 21 January 2015, Singtel launched its new brand identity, the first in 16 years. On 19 March 2015, Singtel dismissed all connections with social media agency, Gushcloud. This is after a Singapore blogger Xiaxue, exposed Gushcloud's brief to its "influencers" to execute a negative campaign on M1 and Starhub, both who are direct competitors. Singtel apologised to both companies for the campaign. On 7 April 2015, Singtel revealed it would be acquiring US cyber security firm Trustwave for $810 million, its largest ever acquisition outside the telecoms sector. On 10 April 2015, Singtel released a new Skype and WhatsApp competitor called Wavee. It allows users to make voice and video calls and send instant messages. On 22 April 2015, the Singtel announced plans to delist from the Australian Securities Exchange due to low trading volumes. In May 2015, Singtel was issued a 'stern warning' by Infocomm Development Authority (IDA) for a negative marketing campaign against its competitors: M1 Limited and Starhub through a marketing agency, Gushcloud. Singtel was required to "ensure appropriate management oversight and control over its marketing and advertising campaigns".

On 11 April 2017, it was reported that Synack had raised $21 million from Microsoft Ventures, Hewlett Packard Enterprise, and Singtel. On 18 January 2019, Singtel was listed in the Bloomberg Gender-Equality Index (GEI) for the first time in recognition of gender equality.

=== 2020–present ===
In March 2020, Singtel announced a US$30 million investment in a new joint venture by Singtel, Thai Telco AIS and South Korea's SK Telecom in a gaming company called Storms. On 1 October 2020, Singtel announced the appointment of Yuen Kuan Moon as group CEO to replace current chief Chua Sock Koong after her retirement in January 2021. On 4 December 2020, it was announced that the Singtel and ride-hailing firm Grab consortium had been awarded a digital banking licence and would start operating in 2022.

On 10 June 2022, three employees of Amobee's email marketing division were convicted of federal crimes related to illegally spamming through hijacked IP addresses. In October 2024, Singtel unveiled RE:AI, a cloud service that aimed to make AI technologies widely accessible to organisations. In February 2026, KKR and Singtel acquired the remaining 82% stake in data center operator ST Telemedia Global Data Centres (STT GDC) for 6.6 billion Singapore dollars (US$5.1 billion). With this, Singtel will hold a 25% stake in STT GDC.

== Network and infrastructure ==
Singtel's international submarine cable network provides connections from Singapore to more than 100 countries. It is a major investor in many of the world's submarine cable systems, such as South-East Asia – Middle East – Western Europe 3 Cable Network, South-East Asia – Middle East – Western Europe 4 Cable Network, APCN 2, China-US, Japan-US, Southern Cross Cable and Unity (cable system). Unity Cable Network was commissioned in March 2010.

In January 2010, Singtel announced it had signed an agreement to join a consortium to build and operate the new SJC (cable system) system (SJC). The construction of the SJC cable system started in April 2011 and became operational in June 2013. The SJC has a length of 8,900 km which could extend up to 9,700 km linking up to seven countries or territories. The SJC is connected with the Unity Cable Network and is designed to deliver the lowest latency connectivity between Asia and the US, specifically from Singapore to Los Angeles.

As of fourth quarter of 2014, Singtel Mobile's 4G outdoor coverage was at 99.41%, ranked first followed by M1's 99.04%, and Starhub's 98.85%.

Singtel signed a partnership with NETSTARS, (a Tokyo-based mobile payment technology company) in March 2019. This will allow travelers to use their home mobile wallets on Singtel's VIA network to pay digitally at stores in Japan.

=== Singtel's mobile network in Singapore ===
Frequencies used on Singtel Network in Singapore
| Band | Frequency | Frequency Width (MHz) | Protocol | Notes |
|---|---|---|---|---|
| 8 (900 MHz) | (905~915; 950~960) | 2x10 | LTE | |
| 28 (700 MHz) | (703~748; 758~803) | 2x20 | LTE, 5G NR | |
| 3 (1800 MHz) | (1710~1740; 1805~1835) | 2x30 | LTE | |
| 1 (2100 MHz) | (1935.1~1955.1; 2125.1~2145.1) | 2x20 | 5G NR | |
| 7 (2600 MHz) | (2540~2560; 2660~2680) | 2x20 | LTE | |
| 38 / 41 (2600 MHz) | 2600~2615 | 15 | LTE | |
| 78 (3.5 GHz) | 3450~3550 | 100 | 5G NR | |

== Products and services ==
=== Fixedline and Broadband ===
Singtel is the principal fixedline and broadband services provider of Singapore, having 0.7 million customers as of March 2025, and a market share of 45.8%.

=== Mobile services ===
Singtel is the largest mobile services provider in Singapore, having 4.5 million customers and a 44.6% market share as of March 2025.

=== Singtel TV ===
Singtel TV (formerly known as Singtel IPTV and mio TV) is a pay television service provided by Singtel in Singapore launched in 2007. It is transmitted through Singtel's broadband network via an IPTV platform, which uses Ericsson Mediaroom (originally developed by Microsoft) as its end-to-end software platform. The service allows multimedia content, including linear channels and on-demand content, to be viewed on any television set. The IPTV service utilises IP set-top boxes (STBs), connected through Singtel's optical fibre broadband service.

== Key operating companies ==
The Singtel group of companies includes subsidiaries, associated companies, as well as shareholdings in overseas entities. Its mainstay is in the mobile phone industry, where it has a total subscription base of 638 million as of 31 March 2017:

=== Regional mobile subsidiaries ===
| | | Country Mobile Share Data | | | | | | | | | |
| Mobile company | Country | Stake | Market Position | as of 31 March 2023 | as of 31 March 2022 | as of 31 March 2021 | as of 31 March 2020 | as of 31 March 2019 | as of 30 June 2018 | as of 31 March 2017 | as of 31 March 2016 |
|---|---|---|---|---|---|---|---|---|---|---|---|
| Advanced Info Service | Thailand | 23% | No. 1 | 47.8% | 46% | 46% | 45.2% | 45% | 45% | 45% | 47% |
| Bharti Airtel | India | 27.5% | No. 2 | 32.4% | 31.6% | 29.8% | 28.4% | 28% | 31% | 23% | 24% |
| Globe Telecom | Philippines | 47% | No. 1 | 56.4% | 55.4% | 52.6% | 55% | 57% | 52% | 48% | 46% |
| Optus | Australia | 100% | No. 2 | 31.2% | 31.3% | 31.4% | (no data) | (no data) | 28% | 27% | 30% |
| Telkomsel | Indonesia | 30% | No. 1 | 49.1% | 53.6% | 58.7% | 59.3% | 51% | 50% | 48% | 30% |

=== Mobile ===
- Singtel Mobile Singapore Pte Ltd – operation and provision of cellular mobile telecommunications systems and services, resale of fixed line and broadband services
- Optus Mobile Pty Limited – provision of mobile phone services
  - Virgin Mobile (Australia) Pty Limited – provision of mobile phone services, wholly own subsidiary of Optus

=== ICT ===
- NCS – provision of information technology and consultancy services
- Alphawest – provision of information technology services
- Uecomm – provision of data communication services

=== Digital ===
- Amobee – provision of mobile advertising
- Pixable – provision of mobile photo search and aggregation services
- DataSpark – provision of big data geolocation analytics
- Singtel Digital Media Pte Ltd (STDM) – development and management of on-line internet portal
- Singtel Idea Factory Pte Ltd – engaging in research and development, products and services development and business partnership
- Singtel Innov8 Pte Ltd – venture capital investment holding

=== Internet and TV ===
- SingNet – provision of internet access and pay television services
- Optus Broadband Pty Limited – provision of high speed residential internet service
- Optus Vision Pty Limited – provision of interactive television service
- Optus Internet Pty Limited – provision of internet services to retail customers
- Vividwireless Group Limited – provision of wireless broadband services

=== Associates of the group ===
- Singapore Post Limited – operation and provision of postal and logistics services
- Telescience Singapore Pte Ltd – sale, distribution and installation of telecommunications equipment
- Viewers Choice Pte Ltd – provision of services relating to motor vehicle rental and retail of general merchandise

== Incidents ==
=== Bukit Panjang Exchange fire ===
Areas which had disruptions to the various connectivity services from M1, StarHub and Singtel due to the 2013 Bukit Panjang Internet Exchange fire.

On 9 October 2013, a fire broke out at one of Singtel's major Internet exchanges at Bukit Panjang. The fire started at around 2 p.m. Firemen from the Singapore Civil Defence Force (SCDF) responded to the emergency call placed at 2.16pm and extinguished the fires in 20 minutes. After SCDF had cleared the building for access at 6pm, Singtel started repairing the damaged cable infrastructure. The repairs was initially assessed to be done by 10 October 2013, 7am with 33 cables of fibre strands requiring repairs. However, the repairs was slower than expected as it was difficult to identify the affected cables as visual indicators such as colour coding on the cables were rendered unusable and 116 other fibre cables required repairs as well. Connectivity to affected customers was progressively restored as the repairs stretched into the evening.

The damage incurred extensive connectivity issues in the North Western areas of Singapore, particularly in Bukit Batok, Bukit Panjang, Bukit Timah, Choa Chu Kang, Kranji, Marsiling, Teck Whye and Woodlands. Singtel reported 100 mobile base stations were affected, disconnecting its mobile service subscribers in the area. It also reported that around 60,000 fixed broadband lines, 46,000 mioTV subscribers, and 30,000 voice lines were also affected. OpenNet also reported that 81 of its fibre cables were damaged, affecting 46,000 fibre connections downstream. Business such as StarHub, M1, DBS, OpenNet and Singapore Pools saw varying levels of disruptions to their services and operations islandwide.

The cables were reconnected on 11 October 2013. However, there were still some subscribers whose connectivity services were still disrupted as of 16 October 2013. StarHub indicated that some of the repaired OpenNet cables, which it relied on to carry its fibre internet services, were not connected properly. Likewise, Singtel reported that several cables required further rectification works. Both offered alternate connectivity solutions to the affected subscribers as a temporary measure while further work took place, with StarHub sending cable modems to its affected subscribers to connect to its then existing coaxial cable network (which could carry Internet services, and was put to an end in June 2019), and Singtel sending mobile broadband dongles. Singtel also announced compensation packages to its affected subscribers of its various services.

Singtel had set up a Board Committee of Inquiry (BCOI) to investigate the fire, with Bobby Chin as the chairman. Additionally, the BCOI would also benchmark current network design and contingency processes against international best practices and standards, and recommend appropriate improvements to prevent future occurrences and strengthen network resilience. Separately, IDA had launched an investigation into the fire as well. Questions were raised in the public on the infrastructure design of the telecommunications network. The fire exposed the fact that Bukit Panjang exchange was a single point of failure as connectivity services of 3 major ISPs were affected due to it, with the affected OpenNet fibre cables affecting a wide area across the nation.

Preliminary findings realised by Singtel on 6 November 2013 indicated that the fire broke out during a maintenance work at one of the lead-in pipes located in the cable chamber. The fire was caused by an employee not following the maintenance procedures as well as the use of an unauthorised blowtorch. Maintenance protocols had since strengthened, limiting maintenance work which required heat to be applied and reinforcing training on safety requirements and operations. The BCOI report, dated 9 December 2013, was released on 17 December 2013. The report covered three main areas: fire prevention in exchanges, network reliability and resiliency, as well as public relations and communications. Singtel's board has accepted the BCOI's findings and would implement its recommendations. In Singtel's 2015 annual report, it was reported that the BCOI was satisfied that all the recommendations of the BCOI had been followed up and adequately addressed.

Singtel was later fined $6 million Singapore dollars for the fire incident, it is the largest fine for a telco company in Singapore history. National fibre broadband network builder OpenNet and CityNet - the trustee manager of a Singtel unit that owns OpenNet - have also been fined $200,000 and $300,000, respectively, for failing to comply with safety procedures and restore services promptly.

=== Gushcloud marketing scandal ===
On 14 March 2015, Xiaxue, a Singapore-based blogger, revealed on her blog instructions from Gushcloud to its network of bloggers to post complaints about the mobile services of Singtel's rivalling mobile service providers, StarHub and M1, on social media, in a marketing effort to drive subscriptions of a new mobile service plan targeted at youths by Singtel. Along with her revelation, there were many samples of Gushcloud's bloggers taking up the offer and posting complaints up on social media services. Upon the release of the complaints, both Starhub and M1 called on IDA to investigate the matter.

Initially denying that it had issued the brief, Singtel issued an apology, of which Starhub and M1 had accepted. Singtel also terminated its employee who had worked with Gushcloud on the campaign as the employee did not adhere to Singtel's professional standards and values. At the same time, Singtel ended its relationship with Gushcloud. Vincent Ha, Gushcloud's chief executive, released an apology through the firm on the firm's use of negative messaging and yet criticising Xiaxue's expose for "doing more harm than good to our industry". Xiaxue refuted the statement, saying he was trying to divert blame and calling Gushcloud's actions as "not ethical". Several bloggers involved issued apologies on their platforms as well.

=== Data breach incident ===
On 12 February 2020, Singtel was fined $9,000 Singapore dollars for a data breach incident involving the My Singtel mobile app, a smartphone application owned by Singtel. The incident began from Singtel encountering a technical issue during its migration to a new billing system in early 2018, resulting in the personal data of 750 mobile subscribers being exposed. Of these, 39 subscribers' personal data were in fact accessed by other subscribers over a period of about 11 hours.

=== Assistant manager leaking client data and thieving ===
Pleo Sherwin Cubos, an assistant manager, obtained illegal loan of SGD$500 from an unlicensed moneylender in January 2020. Due to the high interest rate, Cubos borrowed from other unlicensed moneylenders to repay the loan and his debt eventually snowballed to $3,000. He was later harassed by the moneylenders and one of the moneylender offered to stop his harassment if Cubos was to access Singtel's database to illegally obtained the phone numbers of several Singtel customers. Between 20 February 2020 to 25 April 2020, Cubos illegally accessed 27clients' data in the Singtel database and send the data of six clients to the moneylender. In March and April 2020, Cubos pawned three iPads that belong to Singtel for at least $250 Singapore dollars and spent the money on his personal expenses.

Cubos' supervisor later discovered his offences and filed a police report on 2 May 2020. Cubos was then charged and pleaded guilty to one count each of assisting a loan shark and criminal breach of trust charge on 30 December 2020. He was sentenced to imprisonment for three months and three weeks and fined $30,000 Singapore dollars.

=== Retail consultant selling client data ===
Kelvin Foo Cheek Ann was a retail consultant at the Singtel outlet in Parkway Parade. Between 2014 and July 2017, he obtained Singtel's client data from Singtel's system without authorization and sold the data to his acquaintance, Lee Cheng Yan, as requested. Lee offered him $20 Singapore dollars for each mobile number checked on the system. All clients whose data sold were later received harassment calls, messages, and strangers appearing at their homes and demanding money.

Foo took a total of $180 Singapore dollars of bribes from Lee. Foo pleaded guilty to one charge of corruption, five charges of unauthorized access to Singtel's system, and 10 charges were taken into consideration during sentencing.

=== Zero-day attack ===
On 11 February 2021, Singtel issued a statement admitting the company had been attacked by hackers in Zero-day attack which resulted in a data breach. Singtel CEO Yuen Kuan Moon issued a public apology regarding the incident, which was caused by a vulnerability in an Accellion file-sharing system used by Singtel. Accellion issued its first alert of the exploits in December 2020, Singtel then applied a series of patches provided by Accellion to resolve the vulnerability. On 23 January 2021, Accellion stated that a new vulnerability had emerged and patches previously applied in December 2020 are ineffective. Singtel immediately took its system offline since. Singtel's attempt to patch the new vulnerability in the FTA system on 30 January 2021 triggered an anomaly alert, and Accellion later informed that the system might have been breached. Singtel's investigations later confirmed the system was breached and identified 20 January 2021 as the occurrence day.

Data stolen in the breach
| Type | Amount |
|---|---|
| Singtel's customer's data, including NRIC, date of birth, name, contact number and address. | 129000 customers |
| Bank account info of former Singtel employees. | 28 employees |
| Credit card details of staff of a cooperate customers with Singtel mobile lines. | 45 staffs |
| Information of enterprises. | 23 enterprises |

=== Amobee executives plead guilty to hijacking IP addresses in order to send illegal spam ===
On 10 June 2022, three employees of the affiliate marketing platform Amobee pleaded guilty in federal court to hijacking Internet Protocol (IP) addresses to send unsolicited commercial email messages, commonly known as “spam.”

=== Volt Typhoon attack ===
In June 2024, Singtel was breached by China's Volt Typhoon advanced persistent threat. Following a report by Bloomberg News in November 2024, Singtel responded that it had "eradicated" malware from the threat.
