= Optus =

Australian telecommunications company

Singtel Optus Pty Limited

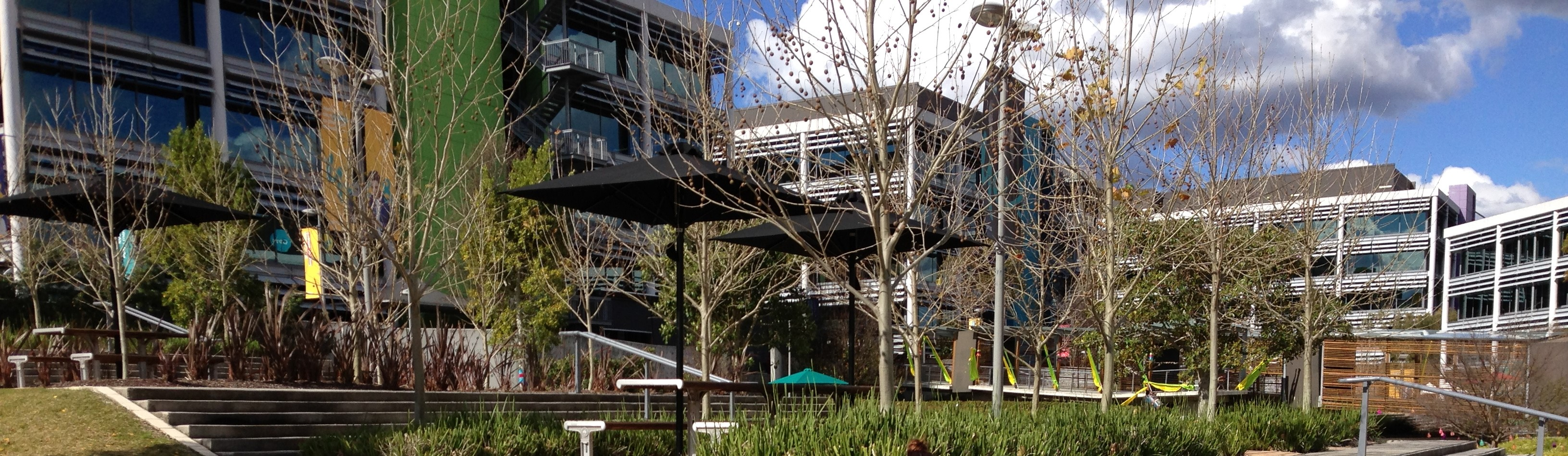
- Optus headquarters in Macquarie Park
- Type: Subsidiary
- Industry: Telecommunications
- Founded: 1981; 45 years ago (as AUSSAT)
- Headquarters: Macquarie Park, New South Wales, Australia
- Area served: Australia
- Key people: John Arthur (Chairman) Stephen Rue (CEO)
- Products: Fixed telephony Mobile telephony Internet access Cable television Leased lines Data transmission
- Revenue: ▲ A$8.05 billion (2023)
- Operating income: ▲ A$2.09 billion (2023)
- Net income: ▲ A$286 million (2023)
- Number of employees: 7,572 (2023)
- Parent: Singtel
- Divisions: Amaysim
- Website: optus.com.au

Singtel Optus Pty Limited is a major Australian telecommunications company headquartered in Macquarie Park, Sydney. Optus is the second-largest telecommunications company in Australia, with over 10.7 million mobile customers and 1.3 million home customers as of 2025. Its mobile network covers 99.11% of the Australian population as of 2026, with plans to cover all of Australia by 2026 through its partnership with SpaceX.

Optus is a wholly owned subsidiary of Singaporean telecommunications company Singtel.

== History ==
=== AUSSAT and deregulation (1981–1990) ===
Optus can trace its beginnings back to the formation of the Government-owned AUSSAT Pty Limited in 1981. In 1982, Aussat selected the Hughes 376 for their initial satellites, with the first, AUSSAT A1, launched in August 1985. AUSSAT satellites were used for both military and civilian satellite communications, and delivering television services to remote outback communities.

With Aussat operating at a loss and with moves to deregulate telecommunications in Australia, the government decided to sell Aussat, coupled with a telecommunications licence. The licence was sold to Optus Communications – a consortium including:

- logistics firm Mayne Nickless (24.99%);
- UK telecommunications company Cable & Wireless (24.50%);
- US telecommunications company BellSouth (24.50%);
- AIDC Limited (10.00%);
- insurance and investment company AMP (10.00%); and
- insurance and investment company National Mutual (6.02%).

The new telecommunications company was designed to provide competition to then government owned telecommunications company Telecom Australia, now known as Telstra.

=== Founding of Optus (1991–present) ===
Optus gained the second general carrier licence in January 1991.

After privatisation, AUSSAT became Optus and its first offering to the general public was to offer long-distance calls at cheaper rates than that of its competitor Telstra. The long-distance calling rates on offer were initially available by consumers dialing 1 before the area code and phone number. Following this, a ballot process was conducted by then regulator AUSTEL, with customers choosing their default long-distance carrier. Customers who made no choice or did not respond to the mailout campaign automatically remained as a Telstra long-distance customer. Customers who remained with Telstra could dial the override code of 1456 before the area code and phone number to manually select Optus as the carrier for that single call. Since 1 July 1998, consumers have the choice of preselecting their preferred long-distance carrier or dialling the override code before dialling a telephone number.

The group began by building an interstate fibre optic cable and a series of exchanges between Optus' interstate network and Telstra's local network. It also laid fibre optics into major office buildings and industrial areas, and focused on high bandwidth local, (interstate) long distance, and interstate calls for business. In its early years, Optus was only able to offer local and long-distance calls to residential customers through Telstra's local phone network. Telstra would carry residential to residential calls to Optus' exchanges, and then the calls would be switched to Optus' long-distance fibre optic network.

In 1993 Optus, along with Telstra and Vodafone were licensed by the regulator Austel (now the ACMA) to provide 2G GSM mobile telephony. Optus's mobile service launched in May of that year.

In 2024, Singtel held advanced talks with Brookfield to sell a 20% stake in Optus. Brookfield and Singtel were unable to agree on terms, with Singtel claiming afterwards it remained committed to Optus and the Australian market.

=== Incidents and controversies ===
At 8:00am on 16 July 2008 a wide-ranging outage affected customers in Queensland and Northern NSW. Customers of Optus, iiNet, 3 Mobile and Virgin were reported as down. Examples of services affected included Brisbane Airport, public transport, hospitals, landlines, ATM's and EFTPOS. The fault occurred as a result of a fibre optic cable at Molendinar being severed by earthworks, and the inland fibre path via Stanthorpe had failed the night prior. Partial restoration of services occurred at 12:30pm. The same cited article also mentions brief detail of 1,800 ADSL and DSL services experiencing an outage in January of the same year due to the carrier's Moorooka exchange.

In 2014 Telstra successfully argued an Optus TV campaign was misleading about its coverage.

During the 2018 FIFA World Cup, its Optus Sport streaming service suffered widespread outages that left subscribers unable to view matches; chief executive Allen Lew apologised, temporary simulcasts were arranged with SBS, and subscriptions were made free with refunds offered to affected customers.

In April 2018, Optus removed and investigated a Neutral Bay retail job ad that improperly expressed a preference for "Anglo-Saxon" applicants.

In February 2019, the Federal Court imposed a $10 million penalty after Optus admitted misleading customers charged via its Direct Carrier Billing service for unwanted digital content, with hundreds of thousands refunded.

In September 2025, Optus paid a $100 million penalty in response to a court order that it had engaged in "unconscionable conduct" by recommending products that customers could not afford, did not want or could not use. Such customers were unemployed, homeless, had a disability or did not speak English as their first language. First Nations people from regional areas were also targeted.

==== 2022 cyberattack ====
Around 22 September 2022, Optus systems sustained a significant cyberattack that resulted in a major data breach of both current and former customers' personal information, including customers' names, dates of birth, phone numbers and email addresses, with a smaller subset of customers having their street addresses, driving licence details and passport numbers leaked. Optus CEO Kelly Bayer Rosmarin urged customers to exercise "heightened awareness" regarding transactions with their Optus and other accounts. Rosmarin emphasised that passwords were not compromised. The CEO said that the "worst-case scenario" regarding the number of customers whose data had been leaked was 9.8 million customers, but believes the actual number to be far lower.

On 24 September 2022, Australian news outlets The Age and The Sydney Morning Herald reported that Optus was investigating the authenticity of a ransom demand of US$1 million made on a hacking forum. The demand gave Optus one week to pay the ransom in cryptocurrency else the data will be sold for US$300,000 to whoever else wants it.

On 6 October, the Australian Federal Police announced the arrest of a 19-year-old man who had allegedly threatened 93 Optus customers by saying that he would use their information leaked in the attack to commit financial crimes, unless they paid AUD $2,000.

In response to the cyberattack, the Australian federal government announced an emergency regulation on 6 October, in the form of a 12-month amendment to the Telecommunications Regulations 2021 to "enable telecommunications companies to temporarily share approved government identifier information with regulated financial services entities."

On 11 October, the Office of the Australian Information Commissioner launched an investigation, the aim of which is to explore the company's handling of customers' data.

==== 2023 nationwide outage ====
Early on 8 November 2023, an undetermined issue caused a nationwide outage in Optus Mobile and Fixed Internet services. The outage directly impacted more than 10 million customers, including government services, hospitals and businesses. Optus Mobile customers reported that their phones showed 'SOS only' on the signal indicator, which is a sign the regular network is down, but mobile phones still have access to alternate networks in the event of an emergency call by using a so-called camping mechanism; however, Optus landlines were unable to make Triple Zero (000) emergency calls. The outage affected the communication systems for Melbourne's train network, so for safety reasons the whole network was halted until backup communications commenced, leading to major delays and cancellations throughout the day.

==== 2025 emergency services outage ====
Starting approximately 12:30 am on 18 September 2025, Optus experienced an outage affecting callers on its network being able to access the Triple Zero emergency services calling system. Approximately 600 calls to Triple Zero made from the Northern Territory, South Australia, Western Australia and New South Wales failed and were not camped off to another network. A technical fault in a firewall upgrade resulted in the network incorrectly blocking Triple Zero calls until at least 1:50 pm, at some point shortly after Optus reverted the change.

At least four people were found to have died after being unable to contact emergency services during the outage: an eight-week-old boy and 68-year-old woman from South Australia, and a 49-year-old and 74-year-old man from Western Australia. The death of the eight-week-old is not believed to be contributed to by the outage, while investigations are continuing around the other three. The company has received significant criticism for its handling of the outage, including not notifying emergency services that people were unable to contact Triple Zero for at least 9 hours, delays in providing government authorities with details of failed calls, and holding press conferences announcing the deaths of callers prior to alerting authorities. Multiple government regulators and police services as well as Optus have announced independent investigations into the outage and the company's handling of it.

On 28 September, Optus experienced a separate outage in Dapto, New South Wales in which nine calls to Triple Zero did not connect due to a failed mobile phone tower.

On 5 November, Optus experienced a widespread issue in the Hunter Valley of New South Wales. It included regions such as Port Stephens and Maitland. The issue lasted from 5:10 pm to 5:55 pm.

== Products and services ==
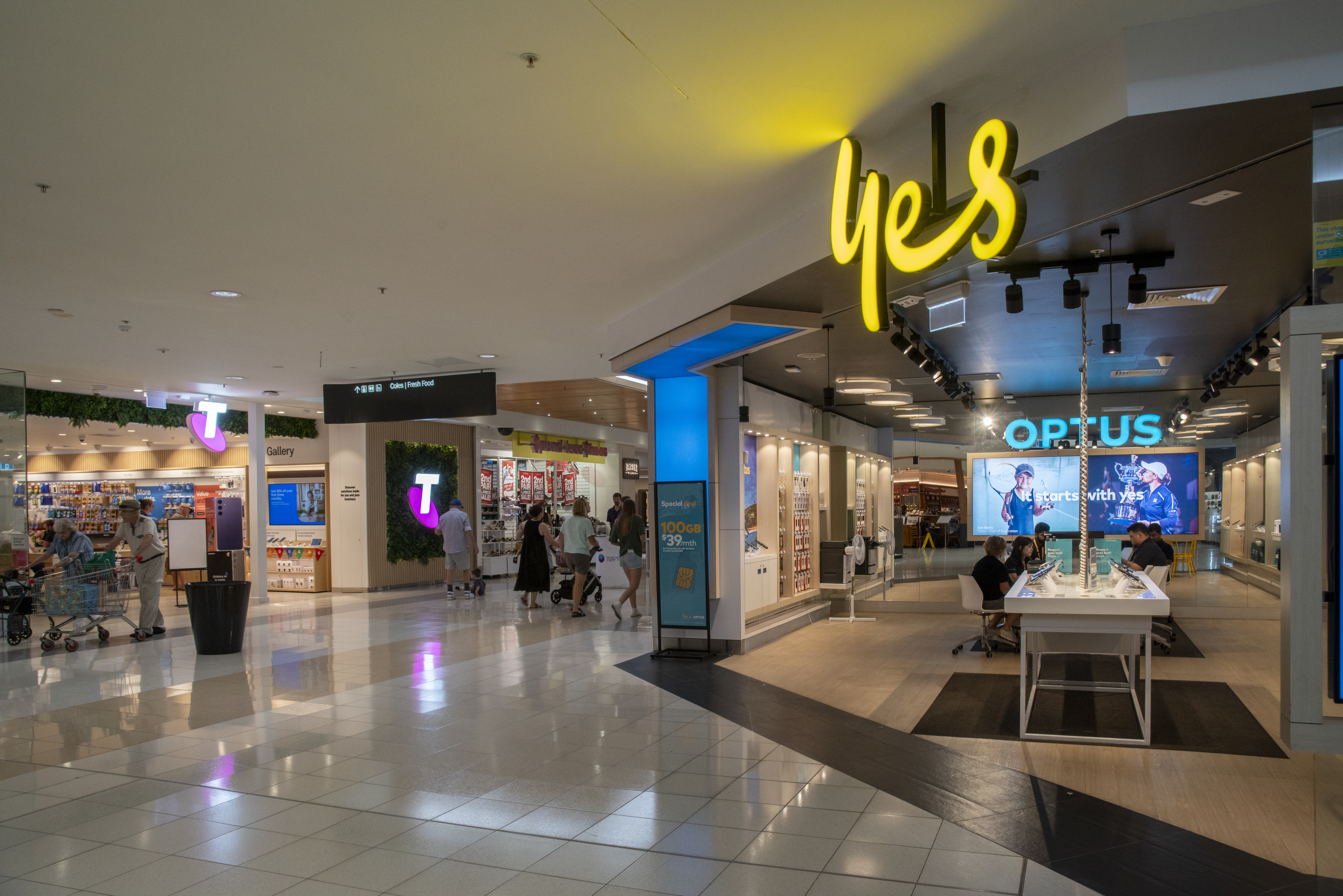
Optus Store at Midland Gate

Key Optus products and services include:

=== Voice ===
- Residential and Commercial POTS for local and long-distance telephony
- Commercial VoIP and VoDSL
- Intelligent Network applications, such as free call, 1300 and Interactive voice response services

=== Internet access ===
- NBN Internet (via Cable, FTTB, FTTC, FTTN, FTTP, Fixed wireless and Satellite)
- Residential Broadband Internet (via cable and DSL) in all states (except the Northern Territory).
- Commercial and wholesale internet access
- Secure Gateway services for Federal Government departments
- NBN Wireless – not continued for new connects
- 5G home internet

=== Television ===
- Optus Television service provided in Sydney, Melbourne and Brisbane, including Foxtel Digital

Retail services are sold to customers via phone, internet or through retail outlets, especially franchise chains such as Optus World, Network Communications, Strathfield, TeleChoice, and Allphones.

Optus' Customer Solutions and Services (CS&S) organisation is responsible for providing support to Optus Business customers. CS&S works with Optus' subsidiary Alphawest to support information technology services across Optus' large business, corporate and government client base.

== Corporate affairs ==
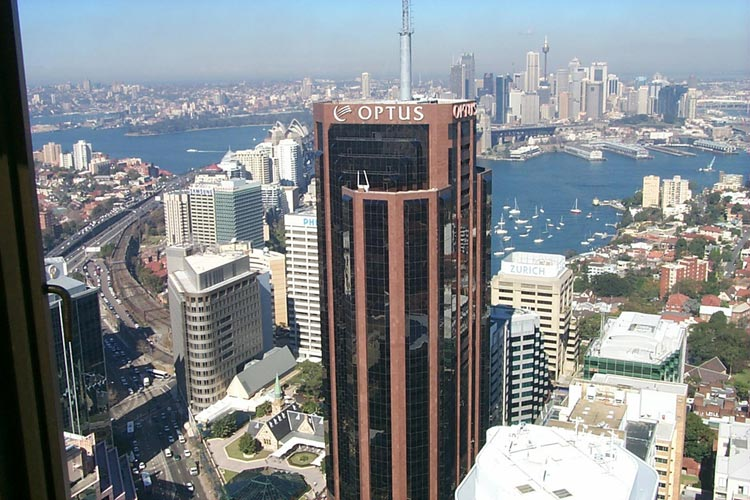
The former headquarters of Optus in North Sydney

Former logos of Optus

1991–1999

Stephen Rue commenced as Chief Executive Officer of Optus in November 2024 following the resignation of Kelly Bayer Rosmarin after the 2023 nation-wide outage. Rue was previously the Chief Executive of NBN Co and is an Executive Director of the Optus Board.

=== OptusNet ===
OptusNet logo

Optus Communications offered its first business-focused internet products in 1998 under the OptusNet product family, offering in-house developed dial-up and high-speed services. Optus purchased one of Australia's pioneer ISPs, Microplex, in 1998 to provide consumer dial-up internet services. Separate to this, under the Optus Vision brand, a cable broadband arm began as a joint venture with U.S. cable and content provider Excite@Home and was known as Optus@Home from its introduction in 1999 until it was renamed in 2002. ADSL services were offered from February 2004. ADSL2+ services were provided from December 2005.

=== Subsidiaries and consortiums ===
A number of notable wholly owned subsidiaries operate as part of the Singtel Optus group. These are:

- Information Technology & Network Services
  - Alphawest
  - Uecomm
- Mobile Telephony
  - SIMplus
  - Virgin Mobile Australia
  - Amaysim

Until 20 January 2013, Optus sold mobile services under the brand name Boost Mobile.

In June 2007, joint venture subsidiary OPEL Networks was awarded government funding towards the cost of building a regional broadband network. Optus was to be contracted to build the network on behalf of OPEL. In April 2008, after a change of the Federal Government from the Liberal Party of Australia coalition to the Australian Labor Party, the new government terminated the funding agreement and the project was halted, with its functions to be replaced by the National Broadband Network.

Optus is part of a consortium – now known as Terria – that in July 2006 announced their intention to make a combined bid to build the proposed National Broadband Network.

Reef Networks was formed in 1999 to provide an optical fibre link between Brisbane and Cairns in Queensland. Optus gained exclusive access to this link in 2001, ahead of acquiring the organisation in 2005.

XYZed was established by Optus in 2000 to provide wholesale business-grade DSL services under an individual brand, but today provides a collection of products only as part of the Optus Wholesale & Satellite division. XYZed established a network of DSLAMs inside Telstra telephone exchanges, utilising Unconditioned Local Loop services to reach end users.

Cable & Wireless with 24.5% stakeholder bought out BellSouth's equal 24.5% shareholding in July 1997. The company returned to profitability in 1998 and changed its name to Cable & Wireless Optus. Government relaxation of foreign ownership restrictions paved the way for the company to be floated – with Cable and Wireless increasing its holding to 52.5%) – and listed on the Australian Securities Exchange on 17 November 1998.

During 2001, Singtel launched a takeover bid for Cable and Wireless Optus which was ultimately successful and the company became known as Singtel Optus.

In May 2004, Optus announced a $226.8 million bid for UEComm. The takeover was approved in July and completed in August.

In July 2005, Optus announced it would acquire Alphawest Ltd. for A$25.9 million. The buyout was completed in November 2005 and Alphawest is now an operating division of Optus Business.

On 11 January 2006, Optus acquired the remaining 74.15% of Virgin Mobile Australia for U$22.6 m, giving it 100% ownership.

=== Outsourcing ===
Since 2005, Optus has outsourced some customer service functions to Concentrix and 247.ai, with the outsourcer providing 800 staff operating offshore in India, supplementing Optus' 3,000-plus onshore call centre staff. Some functions have also been supplemented in the Philippines. Optus also uses 24/7 Inc. for telephone & chat based offshore support.

In October 2006, Optus announced that it would outsource 100 contracting jobs to another Singtel subsidiary, IT company NCS, in Singapore.

== Infrastructure ==
Optus' fully owned network infrastructure consists of the following:

=== Network backbone ===
- ExtraTerrestrial Fibre Optic Network
  - Cairns to Brisbane
  - Brisbane to Sydney (fully diverse over two physically separate paths)
  - Sydney to Melbourne (fully diverse over two physically separate paths, one via Canberra, one via the coast)
  - Melbourne to Adelaide
  - Adelaide to Perth
- SDH Digital Microwave
  - Hobart to Launceston
- Satellite
  - Fleet of geostationary satellites (See Optus fleet of satellites)
  - International Earth Stations in Sydney and Perth
  - National Earth Stations in Brisbane, Canberra, Melbourne, Adelaide, Perth, Hobart and Darwin
- Regional exchanges in Sydney (Rosebery), Melbourne, Brisbane, Canberra, Adelaide and Perth.
- Telehousing Data Centres in Melbourne and Sydney

=== Customer access network ===
- Hybrid fibre-coaxial (HFC) network in Sydney, Brisbane and Melbourne, providing consumer fixed telephony, cable internet and cable television services.
- CBD optical fibre rings in Sydney, Melbourne, Brisbane, Adelaide, Perth, Canberra and Wollongong, providing direct access for corporate and government services.
- DSLAMs in certain Telstra local telephone exchanges in all states. Originally only providing business-grade DSL services, newer installations also provide consumer DSL and POTS telephony.

OptusNet also provides Cable internet. In August 2010, OptusNet released an upgrade of its HFC network to the DOCSIS 3.0 standard, which enabled customers to access a maximum theoretical downstream bandwidth of 100 Megabits. OptusNet is also one of the few ISPs in Australia to currently provide ADSL2+ via its own DSLAMs, which it also resells to other ISPs.

=== Mobile network ===
The Optus network operates on the following frequencies across Australia:

- 4G/LTE provided on 700 / 1800 / 2100 / 2300 / 2600 MHz covering 99.11% of the population. 4G/LTE has been in progressive rollout since 2012, matching the coverage of the 3G network in October 2024, which was when the 3G network was shut down. VoLTE is used for cellular phone calls.
- 5G provided on 900 / 2300 / 3500 MHz covering 94.5% of the population.
- Satellite telephony covering all of Australia.

The 2G GSM 900/1800 MHz network was terminated on 3 April 2017 in Western Australia and Northern Territory. 2G GSM was completely terminated on 1 August 2017 when 2G was disconnected in Victoria, New South Wales, Australian Capital Territory, Queensland, Tasmania and South Australia. To remain connected, a device that is capable of running 3G at 900 MHz is now required after 2G was completely disconnected across Australia.

On 28 October 2024, the 3G UMTS service provided by Optus was shut down. This affects other providers reliant on their network, including Amaysim. To connect to the Optus mobile network, customers are required to have a mobile phone capable of connecting to 700MHz 4G LTE with VoLTE calling. All mobile phones incapable of using VoLTE are prevented from accessing the Optus network due to legal requirements for all devices to be able to access the Triple Zero emergency calling system.

=== Partly owned infrastructure ===
Part-owned network infrastructure includes:

- Southern Cross Cable, a fully diverse submarine optical fibre link across the Pacific Ocean between Sydney, New South Wales and California in the United States. The Singtel group owns a 40% interest in Southern Cross Cables Limited. This interest was originally owned by Singtel Optus Pty Limited, before ownership was transferred to parent company Singtel during the March 2006 – June 2006 quarter.

== Advertising and sponsorship ==
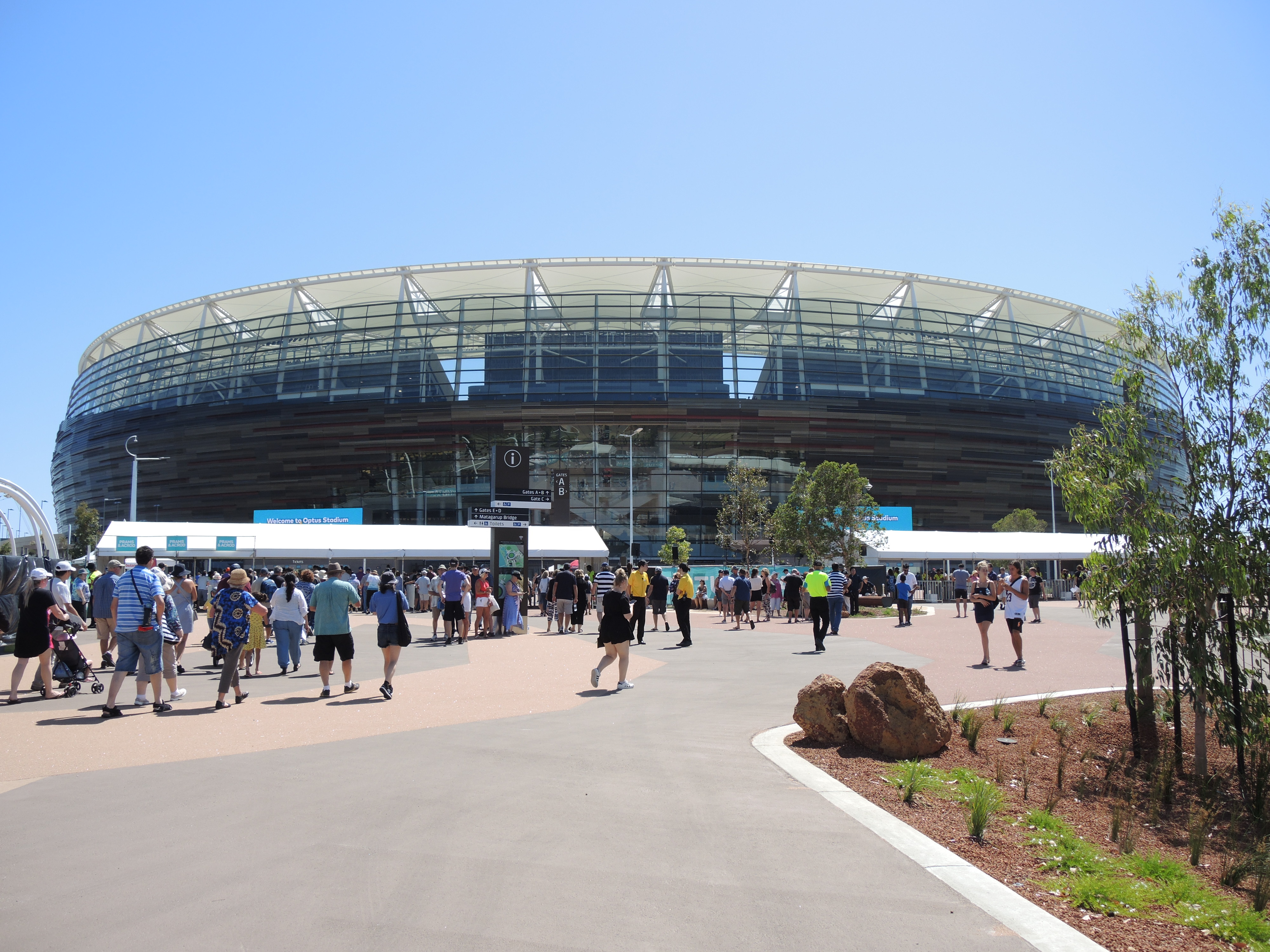
Optus has naming rights to Perth Stadium where it is known as Optus Stadium.

Between 1994 and 2005 Optus had the naming rights to the Carlton football clubs original home ground in Princes Park. It was called Optus Oval until the ground was retired by the AFL in 2005.

Optus was the main sponsor of the 1997 ARL season.

In 2016, Optus signed a 10-year partnership agreement with the Australian Olympic Committee to be the official partner of the Australian Olympic Team and the Australian Paralympic Team until 2026.

In 2017, Optus won naming rights to Perth Stadium where it would be known as Optus Stadium. Optus and the Government of Western Australia agreed to a 10-year naming right worth approximately A$50 million.

Optus also has a long-term partnership with the Adelaide Crows in the AFL. Optus has been a partner of the Collingwood Magpies in the AFL Women's since 2018.

Optus is the current major sponsor for the No. 1 Walkinshaw TWG Racing Toyota Supra driven by Chaz Mostert

== Awards ==
2014	Canstar Blue Awards: Most Satisfied Customers 2014 Award in the small business mobile phone service providers category.
2015	Canstar Blue Awards: Most Satisfied Customers 2015 Award in the small business mobile phone service providers category.
2016	Global Carrier Award: Best Asian Wholesale Carrier Award
2017	Arcstar Carrier Forum: Operations and Maintenance Award Global Telcom Awards: AI Initiative of the year
2018	World Communication Awards: Best Wholesale Operator Asia Communications Awards: Wholesale Operator of the Year Annual MVNOs World Congress: Most Innovative Wholesaler & People's Choice
2025	Telecommunications Industry Excellence Awards: Innovation in Mobile

== See also ==
- Internet in Australia
- National Broadband Network
- Telecommunications in Australia
