= LG GW525 =

Mobile phone model

LG-GU230
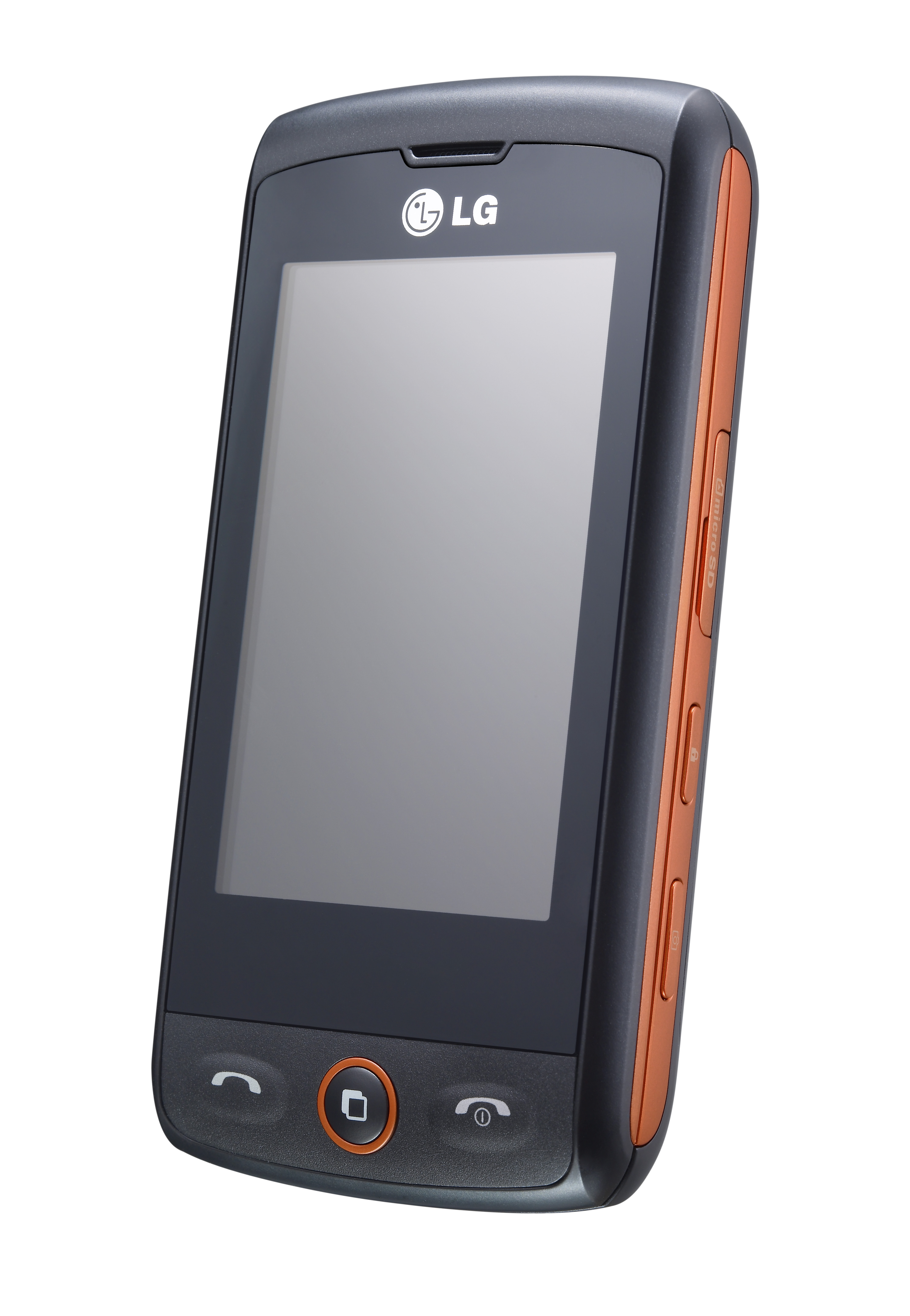
- An LG GW525 Closed
- Manufacturer: LG Electronics
- Availability by region: Q4 2009
- Compatible networks: GSM 850/900/1800/1900, UMTS 900/2100/HSPDA Speed 7.2Mpbs
- Form factor: Slider
- Dimensions: 106.5×53×15.9 mm (4.19×2.09×0.63 in)
- Weight: 125.5 g (4 oz)
- Operating system: S-Class
- Memory: 40MB
- Removable storage: 8GB MicroSD
- Battery: 950mAh Li-Ion
- Rear camera: Yes
- Display: 2.8" Touchscreen
- Connectivity: Bluetooth, USB 2.0 Cable
- Data inputs: QWERTY Keypad and Touchscreen

The GW525 is a mobile phone manufactured by LG Electronics.

== Main Features ==
The LG GW525 is a basic slider phone. The key features are:

- QWERTY keypad
- 2.8" Touch Screen
- Accelerometer
- 3 Megapixel camera
- WAP
- Video Calling
- Speaker Phone (Handsfree)
- 2.0 Java Support
- In-built Games
- Customisable widgets
- Calendar and Organiser
- Alarm
- Customisable Wallpaper
- Downloadable Ringtones & Wallpapers

== In The Box ==
When you buy the phone you should get:

- LG GW525 Mobile Phone
- LG Approved GW525 950mAh Li-Ion Battery
- A/C Charger
- USB Data Cable
- LG GW525 PC-Sync Software CD
- Handsfree

== Technical Specifications ==
=== Carrier Support ===
Theoretically, the phone should work on any network if you unlock it. However, according to the phones website, the phone will work on Allphones, Optus and TeleChoice only.

=== Operating Frequency ===
GSM: 850/900/1500/1900
UMTS: 900/2100/HSPDA Speed 7.2 Mbit/s

=== Dimensions ===
Height: 106.5mm
Width: 53mm
Thickness: 15.9mm
Weight: 125.5g

=== Screen ===
Size:2.8" Touch Screen
Colours: 262k
Pixels:240x400 (Width x Height)

=== Memory ===
Internal: 40 Megabytes
Expandable: Yes, up to 8 Gigabytes MicroSD Phone Book: Up to 1000 Entries

=== Messaging ===
The phone can send normal SMS text messages with T9 (predictive text), as well as MMS, with Video MMS capabilities
E-Mail: POP3 and EAS

=== Camera ===
The phone has a 3 MegaPixel camera with 2 times digital zoom.

=== Media ===
Music: Audio formats include MP3, AAC, AAC+ and AAC++ Video: Video formats include H.263, H.264 and MPEG4 The phone also comes with an FM radio, like most other phones the headset that comes with the phone is needed.

=== Battery ===
The battery that comes with the phone is 950mAh Li-Ion, with 400 hours of stand-by time and 4.5 hours of talk time.

=== Connectivity ===
The phone comes with Bluetooth and a USB 2.0 connector for PC-Sync.
