= Gush Ad =

Gush Ad is an online social media marketing and advertising platform owned by Gushcloud International.

It is based in Singapore, but also holds offices in San Francisco, Malaysia, and Indonesia. Gush Ad is owned by Gushcloud Pvt Ltd, and is resold by Gushcloud INC in the US and TBG Interactive SDN BHD in Malaysia and PT. Media Awan Digital Indonesia in Indonesia. Gush Ad was recently inducted into the Founder Showcase Hall of Fame as one of two Singaporean-founded companies that had achieved significant business milestones.

In March 2015, it was revealed that the company had been engaged by a client to conduct a smear campaign against its competitors, leading to backlash against the Gush and its client.

== History ==
Launched officially on 10 February 2012, Gushcloud was founded by Vincent Ha and Althea Lim, who also previously co-founded The Barnett Group, a boutique digital agency in Singapore.

== Gushcloud 1.0 ==
Gush Ad, which was originally named Gushcloud, had registered users (known as Gushers) earn GC$ (Gushcloud Dollars) by completing tasks on the Gushcloud platform which could then be cashed out for real money via internet banking or PayPal, or donated to charity. Users could also earn Karma Points by completing similar tasks for additional bonuses on the platform, however, this feature was phased out early in its introduction and was not available in Gushcloud 1.5.

A mobile app for Gushcloud 1.5 was available for download in the Apple Store with features similar to that of the website.

The Social Sentiment Network proved to be ahead of its time for Asia, with traction for the Rewards Platform outpacing that for the Social Sentiment Network. The company concluded that the Rewards Platform was more appealing to its predominantly Asia-based users, hence the decision to focus its development and resources on the Rewards Platform. The Social Sentiment Network, Gushcloud.com, is still currently being built, till indefinite notice. The Rewards Platform was rebranded to its existing name today, Gush Ad.

Gush Ad was launched on 23 October 2012 as the social advertising platform that incentivized consumers to interact with advertisements. An interaction could refer to completing surveys, sharing messages, or referring products to friends on social networks such as Twitter through engagement in rewarded advertising tasks. It also saw the fresh conceptualization of a Gush Wallet for advertising credits to be accumulated, where users could earn virtual dollars from campaigns, spend their earnings on the redemption store, or cash out for real money via PayPal or internet banking.

Users sign up for an account using their email addresses or their Twitter. It will thereafter be necessary for them to link their Gush Ad account together with their Twitter account to complete Twitter tasks prevalent on the platform.

== Accolades and mentions ==
Gushcloud was the only Singaporean team that made it to top 10 of the 8th Founder Showcase international pitch competition, coming 2nd place, in terms of Judges scores and 3rd place Overall. It has also recently been inducted into Founder Showcase Hall of Fame – an honor reserved for companies that have gone on to achieve “significant business milestones after the event whether by raising funding, building a great business, or disrupting an industry”. Gushcloud was also named as one of five startups to look out for in Vision Wiz's coverage of Founder Showcase.

Gushcloud was also voted “Most Promising Startup” in I-S Magazine's Reader's Choice Awards in May 2012 and was also the only Asian top 20 finalist in Global Mobile Internet Conference (GMIC) Silicon Valley app Attack 2012. Its marketing campaign for Air France KLM under Gush Ad garnered another nod as finalist in Marketing Magazine Marketing Excellence Awards 2012 (Singapore) in the category of Excellence in Social Media Marketing.

Gush Ad was also featured in various state newspapers such as The Straits Times & Business Times.

== Funding ==
Gushcloud closed a seed round in February 2012 from F&H Holdings. F&H Holdings is co-founded and chaired by Mr John Wu who was previously the Chief Technology Officer of Alibaba Group and part of the key management team of Yahoo! Inc.

== Smear Campaign against M1 and Starhub ==
In March 2015, it was reported that the previous year in June 2014, a Gushcloud account executive had instructed its influencers to launch a smear campaign against Singapore telecommunication companies M1 and Starhub, on behalf its client SingTel, in return for rewards linked to SingTel's offerings as part of its "Digital Youth" campaign. Initially covered by Singapore blogger Xiaxue's blog, the report was picked up by mainstream media. A leaked email containing the instructions was confirmed by statements from both Singtel and Gushcloud. M1 and StarHub have appealed to the Infocom Development Authority of Singapore, the authority overseeing the telco industry in Singapore, to investigate these allegations. They are also mulling possible legal actions against SingTel. SingTel terminated its relationship with Gushcloud and apologized to M1 and Star hub for the campaign. Gushcloud also apologized to all three telcos for its actions. Some of Gushcloud's clients, such as Microsoft and Zalora, have clarified their working relationship with GushCloud, and Gushcloud has removed its list of clients from its website. Some of the bloggers and influencers have distanced themselves from Gushcloud, and even left the network altogether. At least two bloggers have also apologized for their involvement in the negative campaign, but maintained that their negative feedback regarding Starhub and M1 were genuine.
