= Jana Tepe =

German entrepreneur, co-founder and CEO of Tandemploy

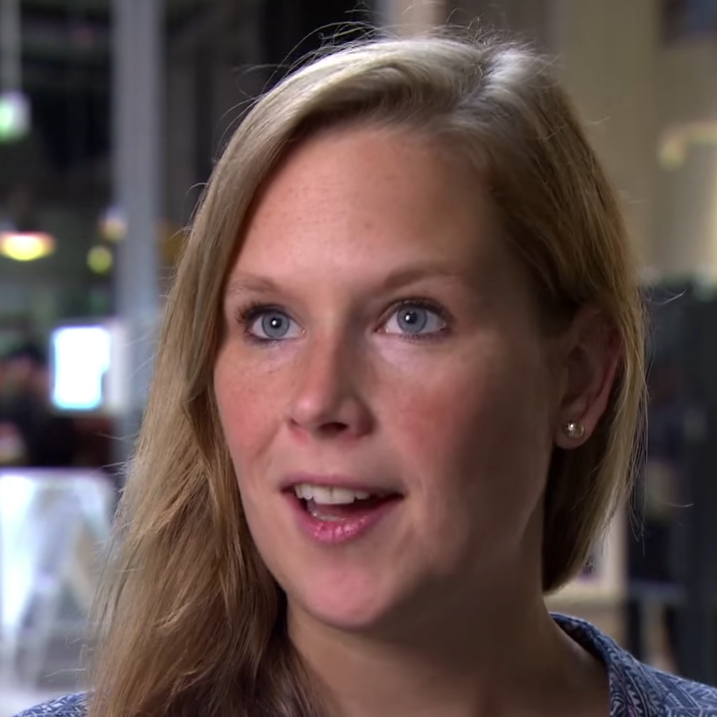
- Born: 1985 or 1986 (age 39–40)
- Occupation: CEO
- Known for: Tandemploy

Jana Tepe is a German entrepreneur, the co-founder (with Anna Kaiser) and CEO of Tandemploy, a German job sharing platform for promoting job sharing, especially for positions requiring higher qualifications.

The company, founded 2013, was taken up into the Microsoft Accelerator Program in March 2015.

Tepe has given a TEDx talk, Stop the men in grey!. In 2015, she was listed as one of BBC's 100 Women.
