= Synack =

American technology company

Synack, Inc.
- Type: Private
- Industry: Security
- Founded: 2013 in California
- Founders: Jay Kaplan, Mark Kuhr
- Headquarters: Redwood City, California, United States
- Key people: Jay Kaplan (CEO)
- Products: Security assessment
- Number of employees: 250 (2020)
- Website: synack.com

Synack is an American technology company based in Redwood City, California, United States. The company uses a software-as-a-service platform to connect customers with freelance security researchers who conduct penetration testing to identify vulnerabilities.

== Overview ==
Established in 2013 by former NSA agents Jay Kaplan and Mark Kuhr, Synack retains a network of security analysts, or white-hat hackers, in over 80 countries to identify software security issues, including flaws in generative artificial intelligence systems. The company calls its approach “Penetration Testing as a Service,” a model similar to running bug bounty programs with added platform-based features like control of testing traffic. In August 2025, Synack released an agentic AI penetration testing solution called Sara AI Pentesting (Synack Autonomous Red Agent) that works alongside human security analysts on the Synack Red Team. The company was also recognized by GigaOm's 2025 PTaaS Radar as both a leader and fast mover and in March 2026, Synack received Global InfoSec Awards for its AI-powered cybersecurity platform and its penetration testing as a service (PTaaS) offering. In 2026, Synack published research with Omdia and Informa TechTarget, which found that while 95% of organizations prioritize penetration testing, they only test about 32% of their attack surface, on average.

Synack customers include the Department of Health and Human Services, the United States Department of Defense, other government agencies and businesses in retail, finance, healthcare and manufacturing. The company has also conducted security testing on military hardware, isolated networks in the Pentagon and U.S. election systems ahead of the presidential votes in 2020 and 2024.

On September 2, 2026 Synack announced plans to merge with NetSPI, creating a $200 million, 800-person organization with expertise across penetration testing and continuous security validation.

== Funding ==
Synack is funded by 21 investors. In April 2014, the company announced it had secured Series A funding from Kleiner Perkins Caufield Byers, Google Ventures, Allegis Capital, and Derek Smith of Shape Security. In February 2015, the company raised US$25 million in Series B funding.

In April 2017, it raised $21M from Microsoft Ventures, Hewlett Packard Enterprise, and Singtel and prior investors.

In May 2020, Synack announced it had raised $52M from investors led by C5 Capital and B Capital Group.

In July 2026, Synack's investors included Kleiner Perkins, Notable, B Capital Group, C5 Capital, M2, Intel Capital, Google Ventures, Singtel, Greylock Partners, Wing, and Icon Ventures.

== See also ==
- Security hacker
- Penetration test
