= Markforged =

American manufacturer of 3D printers

Markforged Holding Corporation
- Markforged logo

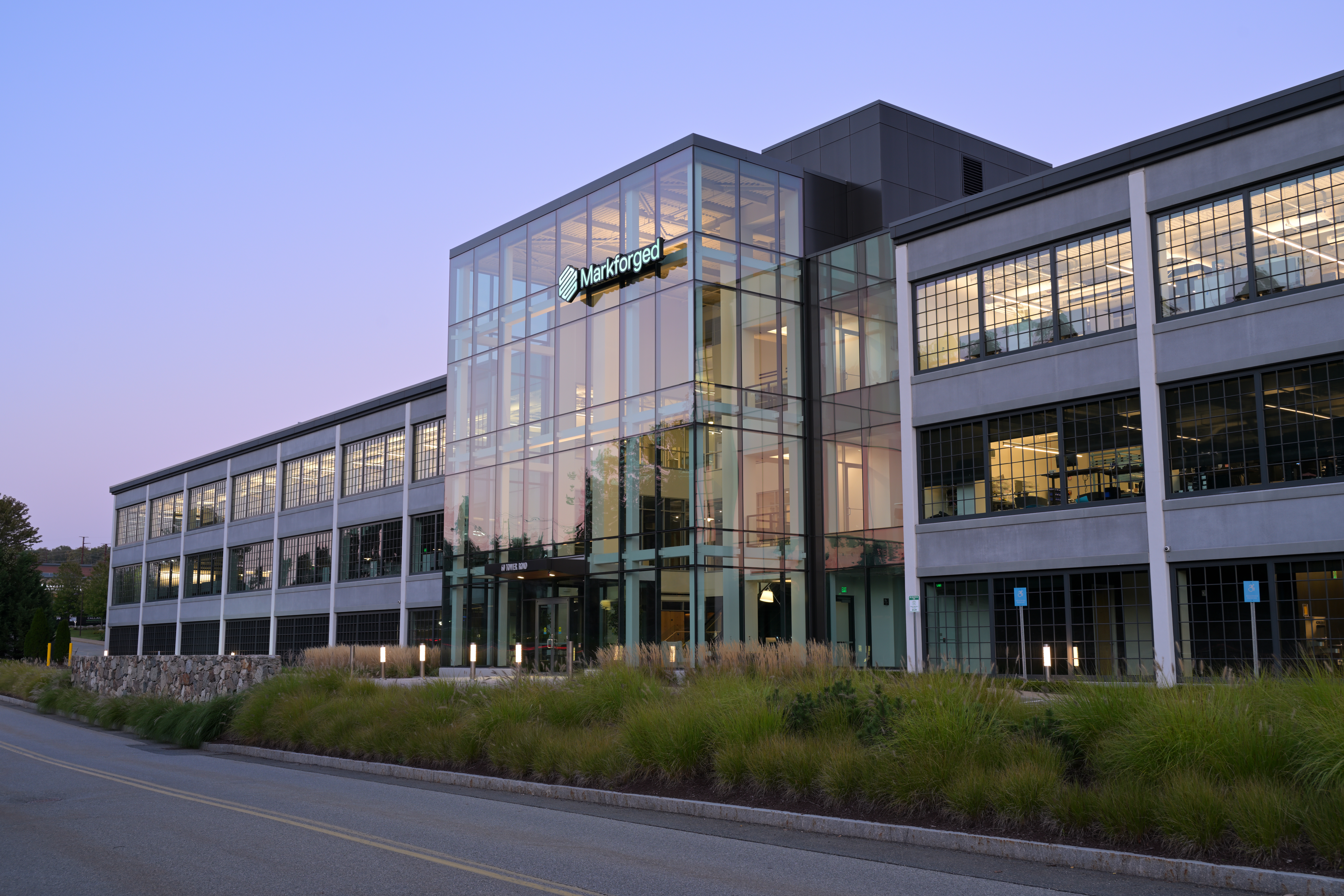
- Markforged headquarters in Waltham, Massachusetts
- Type: Public
- Traded as: NYSE: MKFG
- Industry: Additive manufacturing
- Genre: 3D printing
- Founded: 2013; 13 years ago
- Founders: Gregory Mark; David Benhaim
- Headquarters: Waltham, Massachusetts, U.S.
- Key people: David Benhaim (CTO); Shai Terem (CEO & President); Mark Schwartz (CFO)
- Products: 3D printing systems
- Website: www.markforged.com

Markforged Holding Corporation is an American public additive manufacturing company that designs, develops, and manufactures The Digital Forge — an industrial platform of 3D printers, software and materials that enables manufacturers to print parts at the point-of-need. The company is headquartered in Waltham, Massachusetts, in the Greater Boston Area. Markforged was founded by Gregory Mark and the chief technology officer (CTO) David Benhaim in 2013. It produced the first 3D printers capable of printing continuous carbon fiber reinforcement and utilizes a cloud architecture.

== History ==
=== 2014–2016 ===
The company began as a start-up at SolidWorks World 2014 in San Diego with a working prototype of the "Mark One" printer, capable of printing in continuous carbon fiber (the first to do so), fiberglass, nylon and polylactic acid (PLA). Production machines can also print kevlar.

At the 2015 Consumer Electronics Show, Markforged unveiled its cloud-based 3D printing software Eiger, which allowed for easier collaboration for a team through a cloud-based workflow process.

=== 2017 ===
At the 2017 Consumer Electronics Show, Markforged unveiled the Metal X, which is a 3D printer capable of 3D printing metal parts at a low cost, under $100k. The process has been referred to as ADAM (Atomic Diffusion Additive Manufacturing) technology and it has an in-process laser inspection for dimensional accuracy. Metal 3D printers at the time cost between $500,000 and $1 million.

=== 2018 ===
In March 2018, Markforged was sued by a rival 3D-printer manufacturer, Desktop Metal, which claimed intellectual property theft and patent infringement in regard to methods patented by Desktop Metal involving "adding layers of an easily removed material to a printed metal product". A finding in favor of Markforged was rendered in the patent infringement case in July 2018.

=== 2019 ===
In January 2019, a new UL Standard, 2904, "ANSI/CAN/UL Standard Method for Testing and Assessing Particle and Chemical Emissions from 3D Printers", was published Markforged noted in October 2019 that it was pursuing certification against this new standard, claiming that it uses "a plastic compound that generates lower emissions than many competing machines". In December 2019, Markforged appointed Shai Terem as president and chief operating officer. Terem joined the team from Kornit Digital, a digital printing company specialising in textiles, where he was president of the Americas region. Terem had previous experience in additive manufacturing, having worked at Stratasys years before.

=== 2020 ===
In early 2020, Markforged became the first known additive manufacturing platform to achieve ISO/IEC 27001 Certification. ISO/IEC 27001:2013 is an Information Security Management System (ISMS) standard published by the International Organization for Standardization (ISO) and the International Electrotechnical Commission (IEC). The certification was applied to Markforged's hardware and Eiger cloud and fleet management software, showing that they meet rigorous international standards in privacy, confidentiality and integrity. In February 2020, the company began to market a 3D-printer system capable of printing pure copper, a version of the company's "Metal X" system; the methodology had been in development for some time and involves the use of plastic-encapsulated copper pellets as the raw material.

During the COVID-19 pandemic, Markforged helped to produce over 6,000 face shields in the first three months and partnered with a company called Neurophotometrics to produce Fiberflex Rayon, a 3D printed nasopharyngeal swab for use in diagnostic testing for COVID-19. The effort was renamed Swab56, which developed 55 prototypes over the course of 36 hours before a final design was reached. In October, Markforged announced that Terem was promoted to chief executive officer and president, while the founder Gregory Mark had moved to the role of chairman. The company also announced the launch of The Digital Forge, a cloud-based platform that the company states is the first industrial Additive Manufacturing platform leveraging AI.

=== 2021–2024 ===
In December 2021, Markforged announced its plans to move to a new corporate headquarters at 60 Tower Rd in Waltham, Massachusetts, to accommodate the company’s growth. The move was planned to be completed in the fall of 2022, and as of February 2023 the new headquarters is currently operational. In October of 2023, the FX10 launched as a next generation composite printer. At Formnext in 2024 the FX10 metal print head was debuted. Making the FX10 the first industrial printer capable of printing composite and metal parts.

=== 2025 ===
On April 25, 2025, Nano Dimension Ltd. announced that it had completed the acquisition of Markforged, in a transaction valued at $116 million.

=== 2026 ===
On May 27. 2026, Nano Dimension Ltd announced it had sold Markforged to Stratasys Ltd. for approximately $42 million.

== Products ==
Markforged offers an additive manufacturing platform called The Digital Forge. The platform combines the company's range of products, which include 3D printers, software and materials, with AI technology. All products are developed and produced in the company's home state of Massachusetts. In order to streamline the development of its systems and ensure quality for the end-user, Markforged manages the full 3D printing development stack in-house. Commercial sales are conducted through an indirect channel of value-added resellers and partners throughout the world.

=== Metal 3D printers ===
The Metal X system produces metal parts using the Atomic Diffusion Additive Manufacturing (ADAM) process - a combination of material extrusion-based additive manufacturing and metal injection molding. "Green parts" composed of metal powder and a polymer binder are printed by the Metal X printer. Next, solvent is used to remove a portion of the binder material from the printed parts, leaving "brown" parts. Finally, after thermal debinding and sintering, near net-shape metal parts are produced.

The system was announced in 2017 and launched in 2018, consisting of the Metal X printer, Wash-1 debinding station, and Sinter-1 furnace. The Metal X printer has a build volume of 300mm x 220mm x 180mm. Available materials on the Metal X system include 17-4PH stainless steel, tool steels (H13, A2, D2), Inconel 625, and pure Copper. In 2019, Markforged released the Sinter-2, a larger furnace with four times the sintering workload of Sinter-1.

=== Industrial composite 3D printers ===
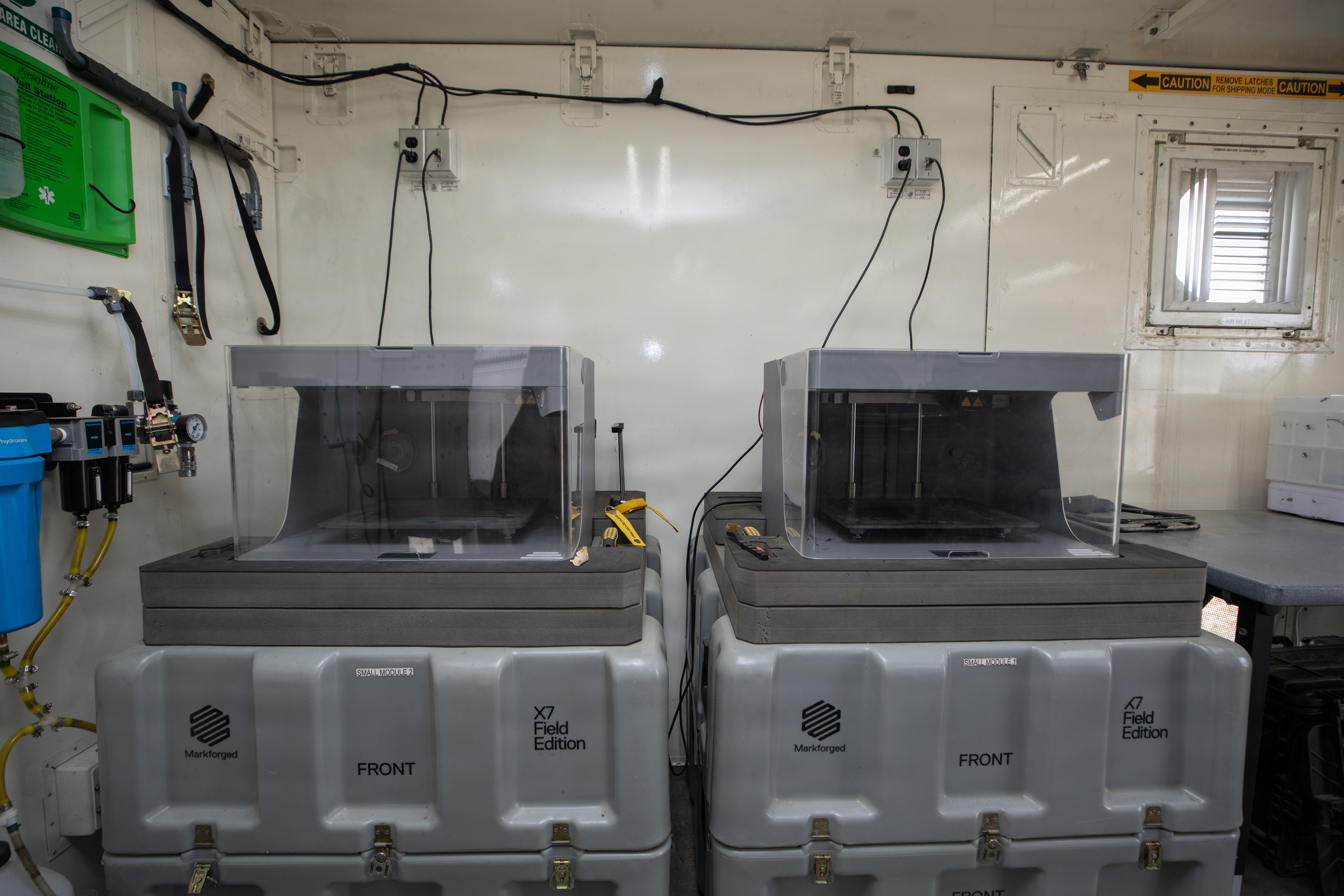
Two Markforged X7 Field Edition 3D printer

Markforged industrial composite printers produce parts using a material extrusion process with continuous fiber reinforcement. A dual-extruder system deposits a composite base material to form the shells and infill with the primary nozzle, and using a secondary nozzle, deposits a reinforced filament containing a core of high tensile strength continuous fibers. Because the fibers are contained in a filament, the printer is capable of freely orienting the fibers within the print plane.

The X7 (previously called Mark X) was released at the end of 2016 with accuracy improvements, a stiffer gantry, and larger build volume of 330mm x 270mm x 200mm, 2.5 times larger than that of the Mark Two. The printer also has a laser micrometer used for bed leveling and part inspection. In 2017, Markforged announced the X3 and X5 printers on the same chassis with modified hardware. Both machines print using Onyx, and the X5 has the ability to add continuous fiberglass reinforcement.

=== Desktop composite 3D printers ===
Markforged released the first commercial continuous fiber printers in 2014, starting with the Mark One. The printer had an anodized aluminium unibody and the ability to print with strands of continuous carbon fiber.

The Mark Two was released in early 2016 as an update to the Mark One. Enhancements include the relocation of the fiber cutter to the print head, motion system improvements, on-printer calibration utilities, and the introduction of a micro carbon fiber filled nylon filament called Onyx.

== Business ==
In July 2013, Markforged raised $1.1 million in seed funding from North Bridge Venture Partners and Matrix Partners and, in May 2014, the company raised $8.5 million in series A funding. By 2017, Markforged has secured investments from Microsoft Ventures, Porsche SE, Tinity Ventures and Siemens-backed Next47 amounting to US$57 million. By 2017, the venture capital firms Matrix Partners, Trinity Ventures and Northbridge Venture Partners had contributed funding as well. By March 2019, Markforged reached funding of US$136.8 million since its founding after raising $82 million in series D funding led by Summit Partners.

Markforged's business model is based on the sale of industrial 3D printers to replace traditional metal manufacturing methods, with the prediction that companies will find parallel printing across many machines continuously to be attractive. The company competes with legacy 3D printing companies like Stratasys, 3D Systems and HP, as well as newer startups like Desktop Metal and Carbon.
