= Althea Lim =

Singaporean entrepreneur

Althea Lim is a Singaporean entrepreneur and the co-founder and group chief executive officer of Gushcloud International, a global influencer and talent acquisition company. She is based out of Los Angeles, United States.

== Education ==
Lim graduated with a degree in biomedical sciences from the National University of Singapore.

== Career ==
=== The Youth Empire ===
During graduation, Lim founded The Youth Empire, which was a Singapore-based company that focused on building a youth-focused community through various events and social initiatives.

=== Gushcloud International ===
In 2011, she co-founded Gushcloud International with Vincent Ha as a social sharing website. It evolved into a global influencer, entertainment, and talent acquisition enterprise spanning multiple countries, such as the United States, South Korea, Japan and the UAE. Lim has been serving as its group chief executive officer since 2017.

== Leadership ==
Lim is recognized for her advocacy for the influencer economy, particularly how it could enable influencers to have a sustainable career. She is known for following a servant leadership approach. Her vision is to build the "Hollywood of Asia", turning Asia as the center for digital content production. She has been a speaker and panelist in various conferences. At VidCon Anaheim 2026, Lim was a panelist on the "Creator Economy State of the Union" session.

== Recognition ==
- EY Entrepreneurial Winning Women™ Asia-Pacific (Class of 2024), by Ernst & Young, recognizing outstanding women entrepreneurs in the Asia-Pacific.
- Overall Winner at Small and Medium-Sized Enterprises (2023), by Women Entrepreneur Awards
- Asia's Most Influential: Singapore (2021), by Tatler Asia, as one of Singapore's influential business personalities.

Lim has been felicitated by the Bangkok Post in their "Women Against the Odds" series in 2022 and recognized as a leader of Singapore's fastest growing companies by The Straits in 2021 and 2022.
