= Strathfield (retailer) =

- Formerly: Strathfield Car Radio
- Traded as: ASX: SRA
- Industry: Retail
- Founded: October 1980
- Founder: Andrew Kelly
- Number of locations: 75 (2009)
- Revenue: $58 million (2010)
- Net income: $3 million (2010)
- Number of employees: 350 (2009)
- Website: www.strathfield.com

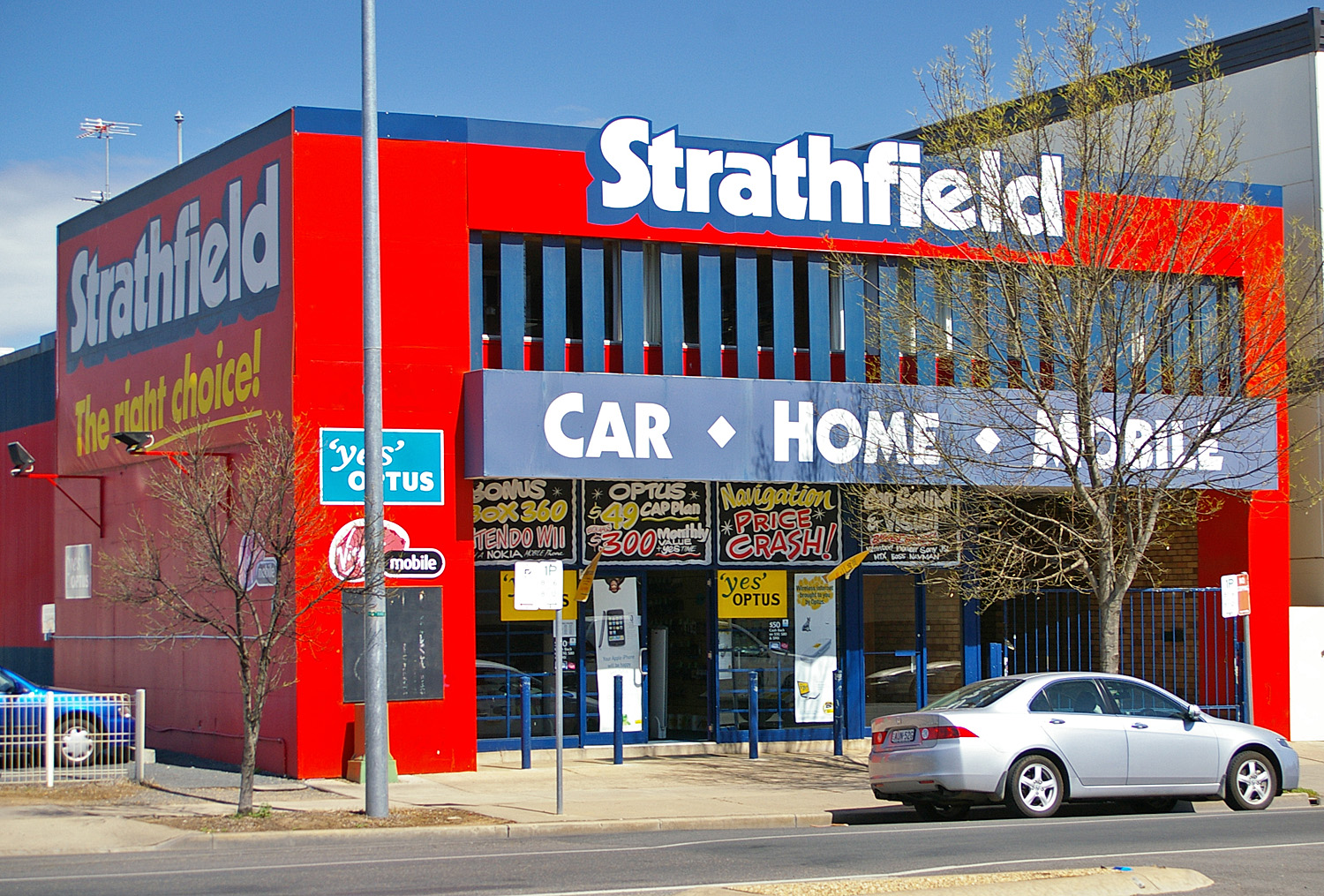
Strathfield store in Wagga Wagga

Strathfield was an Australian retailer that sells car stereos, car alarms, home entertainment, small office/home office items & mobile devices (e.g. mobile phones, MP3 players, iPods etc.). As at January 2009, it had 75 stores.

The company was established in October 1980 in the Sydney suburb of Strathfield. Originally trading as Strathfield Car Radio it was rebranded when other products overtook car stereos as its main source of revenue.

The company expanded into mobile phones in 1987 and it was the first retailer to connect a customer to the GSM network in Australia in 1993. The mid 1990s saw an expansion into SoHo and home entertainment devices.

Strathfield listed on the Australian Securities Exchange in July 1998. Mobile phone and other revenues started to decline from around 2000 onwards and the company has expanded to provide phones from a number of carriers, including Virgin Mobile and Optus.

On 29 January 2009 the company was placed in administration. It then collapsed again in 2011.
