= M12 (venture capital firm) =

American corporate venture capital subsidiary of Microsoft

M12 Microsoft's Venture Fund
- Type: Subsidiary
- Industry: Venture capital
- Founded: 2016; 10 years ago
- Headquarters: San Francisco, US
- Number of locations: 5 offices: Seattle, San Francisco, New York City, Tel-Aviv, London
- Key people: Michelle Gonzalez (Corporate Vice President); Christopher Young (EVP, Microsoft)
- Number of employees: 37
- Parent: Microsoft
- Website: m12.vc

M12, formerly Microsoft Ventures, is a corporate venture capital subsidiary of Microsoft. Founded in March 2016, its mission is to be an active, strategic partner during a startup's growth, typically investing between Series A and D. The fund is managed by Michelle Gonzalez, formerly of Google.

== History ==
=== Background ===
Microsoft Ventures was used as an umbrella for all of Microsoft's accelerator and seed-stage funding operations.

In August 2014, Microsoft Ventures and the Deshpande Foundation launched the Sandbox Startups incubator with an initiative to set up a 20,000 square feet area for incubation in the city of Hubli. The main intention of this initiative was to ensure that better entrepreneurial support would be given to those who reside outside big metropolises in India, removing the inevitability of having to relocate to such places.

=== Official founding ===
In March 2016, Microsoft launched the Microsoft Ventures venture capital fund. The operation previously known as Microsoft Ventures was renamed Microsoft Accelerator, with a focus on "start-up enablement" instead of startup investments.

=== Investments ===
On April 11, 2017, it was reported that the security company Synack had raised $21 million from Microsoft Ventures, Hewlett Packard Enterprise, and Singtel. In late 2017, the company has invested in artificial intelligence with a new AI startup competition, and 3D printing with Markforged. In March 2019, Markforged raised $82 million in venture funding, with M12 contributing.

In March 2019, the company invested in Skedulo, a work scheduling company. In June 2019, M12 invested in AnyVision, a facial recognition company. After reporting by NBC news on the use of its technology in the West Bank and Gaza Strip, Microsoft hired Eric Holder, former US Attorney General, to conduct an audit of the company to ensure that it complies with Microsoft's ethical principles on biometric surveillance.

In September 2019, M12 participated in a Series B funding round in Applied Intuition, a software company specializing in products for autonomous vehicles (AVs).

In Jan 2020, it was announced that Microsoft Venture in a new round had taken a stake in SuperAwesome. In March 2020, Microsoft Ventures and Honeywell Ventures are in talks with FarEye to invest $40 million in the Logistics startup.

Also in March 2020, M12 announced it would lead a $22 million Series B funding round in San Francisco-based fraud prevention platform Arkose Labs

=== Name change to M12 ===
In April 2018, Microsoft Ventures changed its name to M12, to avoid confusion with a previous accelerator program of the same name. The M stands for Microsoft, and the 12 refers to the number of letters in the word entrepreneur.

== Accelerator Plus program ==
Zoomcar was a member of Microsoft's Accelerator Plus program in Bangalore in Spring 2014. This program is designed to provide more tailored assistance to later-stage start-ups as they scale their business and raise capital. In March 2015, Tripdelta took part in the third batch of the Microsoft Ventures Accelerator in Berlin. In October 2015, Farmflo was selected to join the Microsoft Ventures Accelerate Programme in London. Appknox was a graduate of the fifth batch of the Microsoft Ventures program.

== See also ==
- Microsoft Partner Ecosystem
- Microsoft Innovation Center
- List of mergers and acquisitions by Microsoft
