= NCS Group =

Singaporean IT company

NCS Pte. Ltd.
- Primary logo used since 2021

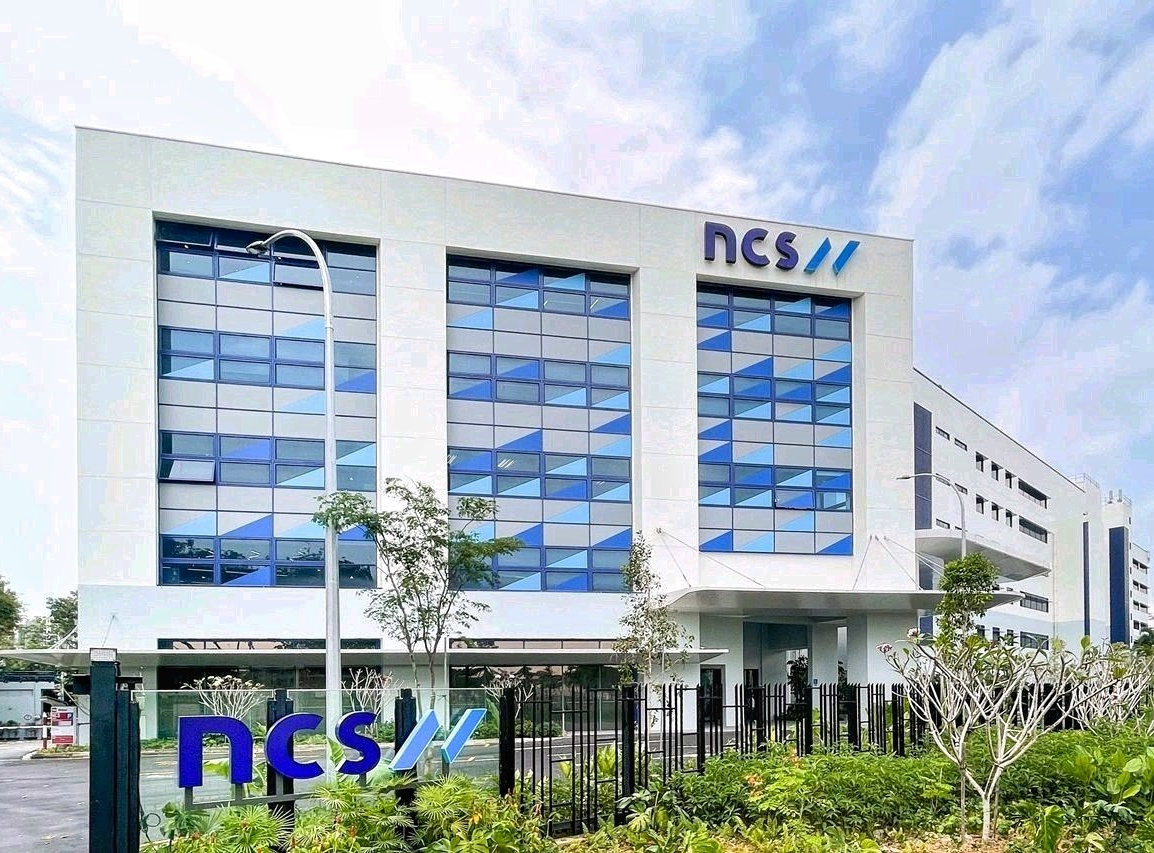
- NCS Hub in Ang Mo Kio, Singapore serves as the headquarters of NCS Group
- Formerly: National Computer Systems
- Type: Subsidiary
- Industry: IT, infocomm
- Founded: 1981; 45 years ago
- Headquarters: 5 Ang Mo Kio Street 62, NCS Hub, Singapore 569141, Singapore
- Area served: Singapore, Australia, Brunei, China, India, Malaysia, Philippines, Sri Lanka
- Key people: Sam Liew (CEO)
- Products: Application, infrastructure, engineering, cybersecurity, NEXT capabilities in digital, data, cloud and platforms
- Revenue: ▲S$ 2.835 billion (2024)
- Number of employees: 13,000 (2024)
- Parent: Singtel Group
- Subsidiaries: NCS Communications Engineering; NCSI Solutions; NCS (China); NCSI (HK); NCSI (Australia); NCSI (Malaysia); SCS Information Technology; NCS Philippines; NCSI Technologies (India); NCSI Lanka
- Website: www.ncs.co

NCS Pte. Ltd. (also known as NCS Group, previously known as National Computer Systems) is a multinational information technology company headquartered in Singapore. Founded in 1981 as an agency of the Singapore government, it was privatised in 1996 and subsequently became part of the Singtel group in 1997. NCS has over 13,000 staff located in more than 20 cities across Asia Pacific in 2024.

== History ==
NCS was founded in 1981 when the Government of Singapore embarked upon initiatives to harness information technology (IT) for both the public and private sectors.

It was restructured as a commercial entity in 1996 and a year later, became a wholly owned subsidiary of SingTel Group. NCS adopted its current name on 1 November 2003.

In 2002, SingTel Aeradio merged with NCS, retaining much of its identity as NCS Communications Engineering (NCS Comms Engg). SingTel Aeradio was a communication engineering services provider in airport consultancy, facility management services, engineering and radio communications, C4ISR, intelligent building, smart security services, transportation services, IT infrastructure system, IT Security training and certification, telecommunication and multimedia.

In 2008, NCS bought 60% of local rival IT company, Singapore Computer Systems, shares, triggering a buyout of the company.

In 2020, NCS acquired digital consultancy 2359 Media.

=== Management ===
In 2005, Chong Yoke Sin became the chief executive officer (CEO). She resigned in 2007 for personal reasons and Lim Eng took over as the CEO.

Lim retired in 2010 and Chief Operating Officer Chia Wee Boon took over as CEO.

On 1 August 2019, the Singtel Group appointed Ng Kuo Pin as the new chief executive officer of NCS after Chia stepped down.

In January 2026, Singtel announced that Ng Kuo Pin would be stepping down as CEO after seven years in office and appointed Sam Liew as the new CEO of NCS. On April 1, 2026, Sam Liew was officially appointed the CEO of NCS Group.

== Products and services ==
The company’s business operations are organized as follows:

Core services offerings:

- Applications
- Cyber
- Engineering
- Infrastructure

NEXT, an expanded digital arm focusing on addressing key digital trends, includes:

- Cloud
- Data
- Digital
- Platforms

NEXT, when combined with NCS’ core service offerings, aims to offer technology services.

NCS serves three strategic business groups – Enterprise, Gov+, Telco+.

The company provides its technological services with a focus on these industries – healthcare, transportation, financial services, industrial, commercial, communications, media and technology. And, placing its focus into high-growth markets – Singapore, Australia, and greater China.

== Awards and recognition ==
In 2024, NCS was recognized as a leader in the Asia Pacific Professional Cloud Services space in the IDC Marketplace.

== Programmes and Sponsorships ==
NCS provides early talent programmes through work-study arrangements – Nucleus (for university graduates), Fusion (for polytechnic graduates), and Ignite (for ITE graduates). The company is focused on developing local tech talent through Tech Skills Accelerator (TeSA), despite recent layoffs from tech giants.

In 2022, NCS and Infocomm Media Development Authority (IMDA) signed a partnership aimed at addressing the shortage of local tech talent by offering work study programmes for polytechnic and ITE graduates. The programme will provide 1,600 tech jobs and opportunities.

Other than work-study programme for polytechnic and ITE graduates, NCS also collaborate~~s~~ with universities to provide sponsorships. NCS partners with Singapore Management University (SMU) to train undergraduates in SMU’s School of Computing and Information Systems through the Bachelor of Science (Software Engineering) SkillsFuture Work-Study Degree.

== Marketing and Branding ==
In 2021, NCS rebranded itself with a new brand identity.

== Partnerships and Collaboration ==
In 2023, NCS partnered with Dell Technologies, Mandiant, Visa, AI Singapore, Assurity Trusted Solutions, Globe Group (Philippines) and the Singapore Institute of Directors) to combine expertise and collaborate on solutions regarding cybersecurity and artificial intelligence.

The company also announced its strategic partnership with Google Cloud to accelerate digital transformation in the Asia Pacific region in the same year.

In 2024, NCS announced its expanded collaboration with Microsoft to accelerate AI and cloud innovation.

== Incidents ==
=== Community Health Assist Scheme computer system error ===
On 16 February 2019, the MOH released a statement stating that due to an error in computer systems managed by NCS in relation to the Community Health Assist Scheme (CHAS), certain subsidies had been miscalculated. Remedial actions were then carried out by MOH and NCS to assess the impact on the affected applicants. MOH stated that it intended to recover its costs and expenses arising from this incident from NCS as it was entitled to pursuant to the contract between the parties.

=== Workers protest at NCS Hub entrance ===
On 18 October 2022, 9 foreign workers blocked the main entrance of NCS Hub, the company's headquarters in Singapore, and held up signs to protest their employers' failure to pay their salary. Some workers held signs reading "欠債還錢" (owe money pay money) and one person held up a sign stating "上海忠記私人有限公司" (Shanghai Chong Kee Pte Ltd).

The Singapore Police Force received a call for assistance at around 1.50pm and thereupon deployed officers to the entrance NCS Hub. The Ministry of Manpower confirmed that it had been alerted of the incident by the police.

The NCS Group told Singapore media outlet, Lianhe Zaobao, that this incident had nothing to do with NCS Group. According to the NCS Group, the incident arose out of a dispute between NCS Group's main contractor Shanghai Chong Kee Pte Ltd, and sub-contractor Zhengda Corporation, and the 9 workers who protested were employees of the sub-contractor, Zhengda Corporation.

According to Zhengda Corporation, Shanghai Chong Kee had not make payment to it for weeks. The latter had since issued two cheques.

=== Corruption incidents ===
Several NCS employees have been accused of corruption-related offences. On 24 March 2020, Teo Joo Tye, a Senior Technical Services Manager at NCS, was charged with 19 counts of offences under the Prevention of Corruption Act 1960 (PCA) in relation to allegedly receiving rewards for recommending a subcontractor to NCS to perform IT infrastructure works relating to various contracts. The offences were allegedly committed between July 2016 and March 2018.

On 18 March 2022, Edward Goh Hai Chew and Lee Wen Han, director and project director at NCS Communications Engineering Pte Ltd (NCS CE), were charged in court for various offences under the PCA. According to the Corrupt Practices Investigation Bureau (CPIB), Edward and Lee had corruptly accepted rewards from Jeffrey Goh Sia Choon, the sole director and shareholder of SC Integrated Engineering Pte Ltd (SCI), including SGD 96,000 in the form of air tickets, cash, and electronic products, in return for advancing SCI's business interests with NCS and NCS CE.

=== Deletion of virtual servers by disgruntled employee ===
In October 2022, Kandula Nagaru, an Indian national working at NCS, had his contract terminated, allegedly due to poor performance. He had been part of a 20-member quality assurance (QA) team at NCS between November 2021 and October 2022. Despite his termination, his access credentials remained valid and he was able to access NCS's systems on various occasions after his termination, up until March 2023.

On one occasion in March 2023, he ran a script which deleted 180 of NCS's virtual servers. According to NCS, its losses as a result of the deletion of the virtual servers amounted to SGD 917,832.

Nagaru was sentenced to imprisonment of two years and eight months for one charge of unauthorised access to computer material (with another charge taken into consideration for sentencing). He explained that he had felt "confused and upset" in relation to his termination as, in his view, he had been a good performer and had "made good contributions" to the company in the course of his employment.

In response to media queries, NCS stated that Nagaru's unauthorised access to its systems was a result of "human oversight" as Nagaru's access was not terminated immediately upon departure from the company. According to NCS, the 180 virtual servers deleted were part of a "standalone" QA test environment and no sensitive information was stored on those servers. NCS further stated that it had "stringent processes and controls in place" and would continue to review and enhance these processes.
