= Gushcloud International =

Global influencer and talent-acquisition company

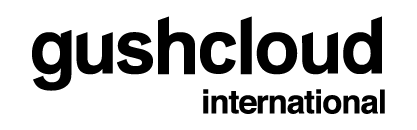
- Type: Talent agency
- Founded: 2011, Singapore
- Founder: Althea Lim, Vincent Ha
- Headquarters: Singapore
- Area served: Singapore, Malaysia, Indonesia, Thailand, Philippines, Korea, Vietnam, Japan, China, and USA.
- Number of employees: 300 (2019)
- Website: https://gushcloud.com

Gushcloud International is a global influencer, entertainment, and talent acquisition company. It is headquartered in Singapore and began in 2011.

== History ==
Althea Lim and Vincent Ha are the co-founders of Gushcloud International, which has offices in Singapore, Malaysia, Indonesia, Thailand, Philippines, Vietnam, South Korea, Japan, and the US, and 300+ employees. Gushcloud International works with influencers, content creators, and celebrities in Asia. The establishment has five working units: marketing, talent, investment, entertainment, and technology.

In 2015, Yello Digital Marketing Global (YDMG), based in South Korea, gained control of the company by buying 62% of its shares for USD 7.5 million but in November 2018, the co-founders bought back the 62% shareholding from investor YDMG for USD 8.2 million. Between 2015 - 2018, it grew from three to nine markets.

Russell Simmons, the co-founder of Def Jam Recordings, became the President in September 2019.

== Investments and Acquisitions ==
In 2017, the company raised USD 3 million from South Korea’s YG Group, a record label and media company, and an unspecified amount from Japan's D2C Inc, which is a joint venture between NTT Docomo, Dentsu Inc, and NTT Advertising, Inc. In 2018, Gushcloud entered into a joint venture with YAN Digital, the digital arm of YAN Media Group and Hahm Shout, a Korean public relations firm.

In May 2018, the company invested in Summer Beauty House, a social commerce venture. In February 2019, Gushcloud International acquired the marketing agency, DSTNCT and launched Ribbit, a micro influencer network, in April 2019. In February 2020, it acquired MODA Creative. In September 2019, it raised USD 11 million from Korea Investment Partners, Golden Equator Ventures, and Kejora Ventures.

== Incident ==
In 2014, a blogger from Singapore, Xiaxue, alleged that Gushcloud had unethical practices, to which Gushcloud issued a point-by-point rebuttal. In 2015, Xiaxue once again alleged that Gushcloud had paid celebrity bloggers to write negatively against the rivals of Singtel, which Singtel and Gushcloud initially denied but later apologised for.
