= Alphawest =

Australian telecommunications company

Alphawest Services Pty Ltd
- Formerly: Edcom
- Type: Subsidiary
- Industry: ICT, Telecommunications
- Founded: 1986
- Defunct: 2013
- Headquarters: Sydney, Australia
- Products: Communications Engineering; Outsourcing; Network Management; Unified Communications; Security; Business Continuity; Contact Centres
- Number of employees: more than 900
- Parent: Optus
- Website: www.alphawest.com.au

Alphawest was an Australian ICT systems development and provisioning, and the associated managed services.

== History ==
Alphawest can trace its roots back to 1986 when Edcom Pty Ltd commenced operations in Perth specialising in sales and support of personal computers. In 2000 Alphawest was acquired by Solution 6. In 2003 it was sold in a management buyout. In 2004 it was listed on the Australian Securities Exchange (ASX). The company focused on hardware sales and maintenance, network management, and development of financial and document management systems.

In July 2005 Optus launched a takeover offer. The takeover was completed in November 2005 with Alphawest delisted from the ASX. In 2013 the brand was retired.
