= Tripcombi =

Travel and holiday companies of Germany

Tripcombi, founded in 2012 as Tripdelta, was a travel metasearch engine that enabled travelers to find airfares globally from different online travel agencies and airlines. It did this by using hidden flight routing and hidden city ticketing techniques. Tripdelta's tactics included combining two separate ticket bookings, searching airfares on low-cost carriers, and booking passengers in the airports close to their place of departure and their intended destination. In March 2015, Tripdelta took part in the third batch of the Microsoft Ventures Accelerator in Berlin. The company was based in Cologne, Germany and, in 2015, was voted as one of "Germany's Top 25 Hottest Young Companies" by Horizont.

Fareportal acquired TripCombi in 2016 and folded it into CheapOAir.
