= Uecomm =

- Type: Subsidiary
- Industry: ICT, Telecommunications
- Founded: 1996
- Headquarters: Melbourne, Australia
- Key people: Kevin O'Sullivan (CEO)
- Products: Network Services; Ethernet VPN; Network Management; Voice Over IP; WDM Services
- Number of employees: 100+
- Parent: Superloop Limited

Uecomm is a telecommunications company with its headquarters in Melbourne, Australia. It is a subsidiary/brand of Australian provider Superloop following their purchase on 9 December 2024 from Optus.

United Energy formed its United Energy Telecommunications (UET) division in 1996. UET established fibre networks in metropolitan Melbourne, Sydney, Brisbane and the Gold Coast, with a focus on providing connectivity to corporates and internet service providers.

UET changed its name in 1999 to Uecomm and was listed on the Australian Securities Exchange (ASX: UEC) in 2000 as Uecomm, with United Energy holding 66% of the new organisation.

In 2001, Uecomm became the first carrier in Australia to offer Ethernet WANs to Australian businesses.

In 2003 United Energy was taken over by AMP and Alinta, with United Energy's shareholding in Uecomm passing to Alinta. In August 2004, Optus purchased all shares in Uecomm via an off-market takeover and Uecomm was subsequently delisted from the ASX.
