= TeleChoice =

Australian telecommunications company

- Industry: Telecommunications
- Founded: 1995
- Headquarters: Melbourne
- Area served: Australia
- Key people: Ehab Abdou (CEO)
- Website: www.telechoice.com.au

TeleChoice is an Australian telecommunications company, founded in 1995. The company was co-founded by Ehab Abdou, its current CEO

Telechoice is a mobile service provider in Australia that uses parts of telstra's 5G, 4G and 3G mobile networks to reach a large number of the population and provide them with a mobile network that covers over 98% of Australia's remaining population.
