= Self-healing ring =

Telecommunications loop network topology

A simple, intact, SHR

SHR with one damaged link

SHR with two damaged links, splitting it into two unconnected, but functional sub-rings

A self-healing ring, or SHR, is a telecommunications term for fault tolerance in a ring network, a common configuration in telecommunications transmission systems. Like in roadways and water distribution systems, a loop or ring is used to provide redundancy. SDH, SONET and WDM systems are often configured as self-healing rings.

== Description ==
The system consists of a ring of bidirectional links between a set of stations, typically using optical fiber communications. In normal use, traffic is dispatched in the direction of the shortest path towards its destination. In the event of the loss of a link or of an entire station, the two nearest surviving stations "loop back" their ends of the ring. In this way, traffic can still travel to all surviving parts of the ring, even if it has to travel "the long way round".

A second break in the ring may divide it into two sub-rings, but in such a case, each sub-ring will remain functional.

== Advantages ==
Self-healing rings offer high levels of resilience at low cost, since it is often geographically easy to take multiple paths across the landscape and link them up into a ring with very little extra fiber length.

Recent submarine communications cables are typically built in pairs to function as a self-healing ring. Very high resilience systems are typically built on interconnected meshes of self-healing rings.

Another example of a self-healing ring network technology is the FDDI local-area network. Resilient Packet Ring is a new technology for packet-switched self-healing ring networks.

== See also ==
- Redundancy (engineering)
- Token Ring
