= Internet in Australia =

Internet first became available on a permanent basis to universities in Australia in May 1989, via AARNet. Pegasus Networks was Australia's first public Internet provider in June 1989. The first commercial dial-up Internet Service Provider (ISP) appeared in capital cities soon after, and by the mid-1990s, almost the entire country had a range of choices of dial-up ISPs. Today, Internet access is available through a range of technologies, i.e. hybrid fibre coaxial cable, digital subscriber line (DSL), Integrated Services Digital Network (ISDN) and satellite Internet. In July 2009, the federal government, in partnership with the industrial sector, began rolling out a nationwide fibre-to-the-premises (FTTP) and improved fixed wireless and satellite access through the National Broadband Network. Subsequently, the roll out was downgraded to a Multi-Technology Mix on the promise of it being less expensive and with earlier completion. In October 2020, the federal government announced an upgrade by 2023 of NBN fibre-to-the-node (FTTN) services to FTTP for 2 million households, at a cost of A$3.5 billion.

== History ==
=== Early days ===
Australia was recognised as part of the Internet when the .au domain (ccTLD) was delegated to Robert Elz of the Australian Computing Science Network (ACSNet) in March 1986. From then on various universities connected intermittently (mostly via dialup UUCP links) to allow for the sending and receiving of email links and for use by emerging newsgroup facilities. Prior to IP-based connection to the greater Internet, there existed a message-based network, linking academic institutions within Australia, known as ACSNet, using the .oz domain and connected to international networks using other technologies. When Australia was fully integrated into the Internet, this domain was moved under .au to become .oz.au and still exists today.

The first permanent circuit connecting AARNet to ARPANet using TCP/IP over X.25 was established in May 1989. It linked the University of Melbourne with the University of Hawaii via a 2400 bit/s (bits per second) satellite connection. It was later upgraded to 56 kbit/s (kilobits per second), and then 256 kbit/s, at a time during which the US end-point was moved to San Jose at a NASA facility.

In 1992 there were two commercial ISPs competing with one another. DIALix provided services to Perth, and the other was Pegasus Networks in Byron Bay. In late 1994 the Telstra team led by Max Bosotti commenced negotiations to acquire all the assets of AARNet and establish a fully fledged commercial operation. Under AARNet the internet link to the node in Los Angeles consisted of a 1.5 Mbit/s link, accommodating all the dial-up services for Australia. After extensive negotiations with the Australian Vice-Chancellors' Committee (AVCC) Telstra Internet commenced operation out of Canberra on 1 July 1995. Prior to this operation the tariffs charged by the then small internet providers was based on time used on the service. Telstra Internet developed a world first tariff in charging by megabits downloaded, soon acclaimed by the rest of the world which followed suit. Some three months after Telstra Internet became operational a new link to the USA was purchased bringing the capacity to 45 Mbit/s and followed three months later by an additional 45 Mbit/s link such was the growth of the internet in 1995/96.

A further early provider was the not-for-profit Australian Public Access Network Association (APANA). Founded in 1992 by Mark Gregson, APANA ran many small, widely dispersed gratis hosts for bulletin board systems and newsgroups, but developed into a provider of low-cost, non-commercial access to the Internet for its members.

=== First broadband ===
In the mid-late 1990s, Telstra and Optus rolled-out separate cable Internet services, focusing on the east coast. The first broadband service over HFC was around 1995 using the Motorola proprietary protocols. In around 2000 DOCSIS was rolled out then in around 2008 the HFC was upgraded to support 30 Mbit/s. In 2000, the first consumer ADSL services were made available via Telstra Bigpond, at speeds of 256/64 kbit/s (downstream/upstream), 512/128 kbit/s, and 1500/256 kbit/s. Telstra chose to artificially limit all ADSL speeds to a maximum of 1500/256 kbit/s. As ADSL required access to the telephone exchange and the copper line – which only Telstra had – this allowed Telstra to be dominant due to the expense of roll-out for other companies and Telstra's established customer base. Other ISPs followed suit soon after; offering a Telstra Wholesale–based service.

=== Internet Peering ===
In 1995, the Western Australian Internet Association (WAIA) was formed (now known as the Internet Association of Australia), and in 1997 it launched one of the first peering points in the country with the Western Australian Internet Exchange service.

=== Competition, faster broadband ===
Gradually, larger ISPs began taking over more of the delivery infrastructure themselves by taking advantage of regulated access to the unconditioned local loop. As well as significantly reducing costs, it gave the service providers complete control of their own service networks, other than the copper pair (phone line from the exchange to the customer). The first competition to Telstra's DSLAMs was provided by then Optus subsidiary XYZed, launching business-grade xDSL services from 50 exchanges in September 2000. Competition in the residential infrastructure market began in 2003, when Adelaide-based ISP Internode installed a DSLAM in the town of Meningie, South Australia. Several other service providers have since begun deploying their own DSLAMs. The presence of non-Telstra DSLAMs allowed the service providers to control the speed of connection, and most offered "uncapped" speeds, allowing the customers to connect at whatever speed their copper pair would allow, up to 8 Mbit/s. Ratification of ADSL2 and ADSL2+ increased the maximum to 12 Mbit/s, then 24 Mbit/s.

In 2005, Telstra announced it would invest A$210 million in upgrading all of its ADSL exchanges to support ADSL2+ by mid-2006, though they did not say whether they would continue to restrict access speeds. However, in 2006, they announced new intentions to substantially alter their copper phone network and set up a Fibre to the Node (FTTN) network. This was later scrapped, with Telstra citing regulations forcing it to provide cheap wholesale access to its competitors as the reason not to invest in upgrading their network.

In late 2006, Telstra uncapped its retail and wholesale ADSL offerings to the maximum attainable speed of ADSL to 8 Mbit/s, however with a limited 384 kbit/s upstream speed. This has allowed many Australians access to higher speed broadband, while the comparatively lower wholesale rates discouraged competitive infrastructure investment in most cases.

Wireless broadband in Australia is widespread, with many point-to-point fixed wireless broadband providers serving broadband-poor regional and rural areas, predominantly with Motorola Canopy and WiMAX technologies. Telstra's 2006 introduction of the Next G HSPA network (which reportedly covers 99% of the Australian population as of September 2008) with speeds advertised of being up to 14 Mbit/s stimulated investment in wireless broadband by competitors Optus, Vodafone and Hutchison Telecommunications, who are presently expanding their HSPA networks to cover 96–98% of the Australian population.

=== Delivering broadband to rural areas ===
Delivering competitive telecommunications services to regional and rural areas is a major issue, with Telstra often providing the only telecommunications backhaul transmission infrastructure. The large distance and small population means that providers interested in serving these areas often must invest large amounts of capital with low returns. Agile Communications is a pioneer of deploying cost-effective, competitive backhaul networks including their own microwave network in rural South Australia. Internode has been active in increasing access in order to be accessible to more people, spending $3.5 million. This expansion will include both "wireless and fixed line-broadband (ADSL 2+)".

In June 2006, the Australian Department of Communications, Information Technology and the Arts (DCITA) under the then coalition government called for expressions of interest for discussion of how to invest up to $878 million in funding under Broadband Connect program to provide greater access to broadband services in rural and regional areas at prices comparable to services available in metropolitan areas, $500 million of which was envisaged as being available to infrastructure projects. On 21 September 2006, the government announced they would invest up to $600 million in broadband infrastructure projects in rural, regional and remote Australia under this program. Applications for funding were open until 30 November. On 18 June 2007, in the lead up to a federal election, OPEL Networks was announced as the sole successful bidder, receiving the entire $600 million in funding under the program, as well as an additional allocation of $358 million. This was to be combined with $917 million to be invested by the OPEL Networks joint venture. The awarding of additional funding was met with some debate. The funding agreement was signed on 9 September 2007, which was dependent upon further planning by OPEL and confirmation that it would reach the agreed levels of coverage. The then federal opposition communications spokesman stated that they would honour the agreement, a stance maintained after winning government two months later, despite their own competing National Broadband Network proposal.

We have said all along, will honour existing contracts. There are a number of performance hurdles the OPEL contracts have to meet. That's all part of the contract.

— Stephen Conroy, Minister for Communications, Lateline Business, 2007-12-05

On 2 April 2008, it was announced that the funding agreement for Opel Networks had been cancelled. The minister cited OPEL's failure to meet the terms of the contract, a claim refuted by the OPEL joint venture partners, who nevertheless stated that the project would not proceed.

=== Innovation in broadband delivery ===
In November 2007 the first Naked DSL product was announced by iiNet. Shortly after this other internet providers also started to provide DSL products without telephony service over copper, reducing line rental fees.

==== 2003: Broadband Advisory Group ====
In a report released on 22 January 2003 the government of prime minister John Howard's Broadband Advisory Group (BAG) recommended the Federal Government work with other governments and industry stakeholders to form a 'national broadband network'. A subsequent Senate committee recommend the federal government replace the 'increasingly obsolete' copper network with a new network based on fibre to the node (FTTN) or alternative technologies.

==== Telstra Copper Upgrade proposal 2005 ====
On 15 November 2005 Telstra, the owner of the national copper network, announced a plan to upgrade its ageing networks, including a rollout of a fibre to the node (FTTN) network. At the time, the Federal Government was the majority shareholder of Telstra, but the plan did not involve any additional government investment. The rollout was later put on hold after the Howard government refused to exempt the new network from laws requiring third party access, instead saying Telstra could achieve the exemption by applying to the competition regulator, the Australian Competition and Consumer Commission (ACCC). Telstra dropped plans for the new network on 7 August 2006, after reaching an impasse in negotiations with the ACCC. Former ACCC chairman, Graeme Samuel later said the proposal was 'an illusion on cost and on the capacity to truly deliver high-speed broadband to end users'.

==== Broadband Connect Policy and OPEL Networks 2006/07 ====
In June 2006 the Broadband Connect policy was announced by the Howard government with an aim of providing greater access to broadband services in rural and regional areas.

OPEL Networks—a 50–50 joint venture between Optus and Elders—was announced on 18 June 2007 as the sole successful bidder in tender.

However, on 2 April 2008 communications minister Stephen Conroy of the then recently elected government of prime minister Kevin Rudd, terminated the agreement because OPEL had 'failed to meet the terms of [the] contract'.

==== G9 Consortium 2007 ====
Nine telecommunications companies—AAPT, Internode, iiNet, Macquarie Telecom, Optus, PowerTel, Primus, Soul and TransACT, formerly known as G9—proposed its own FTTN network on 20 April 2007, however, it was rejected by the ACCC on 17 December 2007 because of future unknown conditions for access.

== Internet statistics ==
In March 2007, there were approximately 4.33 million broadband subscribers in Australia and 2.09 million narrowband subscribers. Between December 2007 and June 2008 there was an increase in the number of wireless internet subscribers from 433,000 to 809,000.

Customers on connection speeds of 1.5 Mbit/s have increased from 2.47 million (37% of total) in December 2007 to 3.10 million (43% of total) in June 2008. In December 2008 there were 7.996 million Internet subscribers representing a year on year increase of 13%. There was a decrease of 30% in the number of dial internet subscribers, and an increase of 28% in the number of non-dial subscribers. Currently, Australia has a theoretical 5637734.4 Mbit/s of transpacific bandwidth, however lit capacity is much less.

Broadband Services in Australia as of December 2016.
1. DSL (35.1%)
2. Cable (7.90%)
3. Fibre (10.7%)
4. Satellite (0.70%)
5. Wireless (45.5%)
6. Other (0.10%)

Broadband Services Dec 2016
Broadband type	Number connections
Total Internet services	13.461 million
DSL	4.716 million
Cable	1.048 million
Fibre	1.431 million
Satellite	76,000
Wireless	6.109 million
Other	1000

- Internet service providers (ISPs): 63
  - Very large: 10
  - Large: 19
  - Medium: 10 (June 2008)
- Country code: .au

Year	Internet access	Broadband Internet access (a)(b)
1998	16%	n.a.
1999	22%	n.a.
2000	32%	n.a.
2001	42%	n.a.
2002	46%	n.a.
2003	53%	n.a.
2004–2005	56%	16%
2005–2006	60%	28%
2006–2007	64%	43%
2007–2008	67%	52%
2009–2010	72%	62%
2010–2011	79%	73%
2012–2013	83%	77%
2014–2015	86%	N/A

(a) Data not collected on broadband before 2004–05 (b)

=== Social trends ===
Purpose of Internet Use at Home 2006–2007	respondents could answer multiple options
Personal/private	98%
Education/study	53%
Work/business	52%
Voluntary/community	12%
Other	11%

Internet access and at use at home by age 2006–2007

Age group (years)	Internet access	Internet use
15–24	79.7%	76.5%
25–34	75.8%	71.8%
35–44	80.2%	72.6%
45–54	78.5%	66.5%
55–64	64.7%	51.7%
65–74	42.2%	28.1%
75+	21.8%	10.5%
Total	69.5%	60.9%

=== Pricing ===
In October 2008, the OECD compared countries where more than 50% of offers have bitrate or data caps. Australia is one of four countries of the 13 with caps where 100% of plan options had download caps, and it ranked fourth in average download limit size (27 GB). It ranked number one by a wide margin in the average price per additional MB after reaching the cap, at US$0.103. The second highest was Ireland at US$0.018 per MB. In a sample comparison of 27 countries, all in Europe and North America along with Japan, Korea, Australia, and New Zealand, between 2005 and 2008 inclusive, the fastest DSL service was Japan and Korea at 102,400 kbit/s. Australia was ranked fourth from the bottom at 1,536 kbit/s, above Greece, Spain and Mexico who were each 1,024 kbit/s. Cable internet in Australia ranked third in greatest increase in speed, from 2,880 kbit/s in 2005 to 20,000 kbit/s in 2008, compared to the other 27 countries. While all but two countries lowered their prices by an estimated average of 10% per year, Australia raised its prices by an average of 14% per year.

=== Economic ===
In 2010, the Internet was reported as contributing A$50 billion (US$53 billion) or 3.6 percent of Australia's gross domestic product. The contribution is second after the leading mining sector and is half of the value of the mining sector. The Internet industry directly employed 190,000 Australians.

== Current state of the Internet in Australia ==
A schematic illustrating how FTTX (Node, Curb, Building, Home) architectures vary with regard to the distance between the optical fiber and the end user. The building on the left is the central office; the building on the right is one of the buildings served by the central office. Dotted rectangles represent separate living or office spaces within the same building.

=== Residential internet access ===
Residential broadband Internet access is available in Australia using ADSL, cable, fibre, satellite and wireless technologies. Since July 2008 almost two thirds of Australian households have had internet access, with broadband connections outnumbering dial-up two to one. According to the recent ABS statistics the non-dial-up services outnumber dial up services 3.6 to 1.

The most common form of residential broadband is ADSL, which uses existing copper telephone lines. In Australia, the major telephone company, Telstra, owns the majority of landline infrastructure, with Optus (a subsidiary of Singapore Telecommunications) owning the rest, making them well-placed to provide the DSLAM technology which facilitates ADSL. Smaller ISPs often resell these wholesaled services, but recently there has been substantial infrastructure investment in DSLAM technology by other providers using local loop unbundling.

Hybrid fibre-coaxial cable networks running at up to 30 Mbit/s exist in all of the major metropolitan regions. Telstra, in November 2009, finished upgrading the HFC Cable network in Melbourne, which will provide speeds of up to 100 Mbit/s, providing the city with the nation's fastest internet. The system was rolled out in December 2009.

Various providers offer wireless networks dedicated to broadband, both in metropolitan and rural areas. Wireless internet is better suited to the more rural areas of Australia due to the larger distances and lower population density which make traditional lines costly. New business models have been used in order to encourage the take up of wireless internet. Prepaid, a concept that has been seen in mobile phones, is being transferred to wireless internet.

The major mobile phone networks provide 3G data connectivity using HSDPA over 3GSM. These are also considered a solution for providing broadband in regional areas

Most Australian ISP plans traffic shape residential customers after a monthly download quota has been exceeded. Shaped connection speeds are typically claimed to be 64-256 kbit/s (kilo-bits) per second, depending on the plan, although 64 kbit/s is barely-usable and an industry standard slow-usable minimum would be reasonable.

Other ISP plans apply "per gigabyte" excess charges to downloads beyond the monthly download quota. The duopoly on internet access into Australia was broken in 2009 with the coming into service of the PPC-1 cable to Guam. Despite this there has been significant consumer dissatisfaction with the service due to the obsolete technology used in the network.

=== Internet in rural areas ===
Internet in Australia has great differences between urban and rural areas. With the March 2007 announcement of the Broadband Guarantee program, which will replace the Broadband Connect program, many long-term projects to bring Internet to rural areas were under review. A week after the announcement, Internode suspended its programs to bring broadband to the country and many other providers had to follow suit as the cancellation of the Connect program removed the financial incentive for ISPs to "supply higher bandwidth services in regional, rural and remote areas of Australia at prices comparable".

In March 2007, the Australian Labor Party announced a new policy, accepting the privatisation of Telstra to help fund a world-class national broadband network.

Due to Telstra's extensive use of pair-gain technology for connecting home landlines from 1994 to 2000, some homes have been excluded from ADSL and are limited to a dialup speed of 28.8 kbit/s.

=== International connectivity ===
Due to Australia's large size, sparse population, and relative remoteness to other countries, a significant amount of infrastructure is required for Internet communications. The vast majority of Australia's international Internet transit capacity is sourced from undersea fibre-optic communications cables to Asia and the US. Until 2009 data costs across the Pacific were constrained by a Telstra–Telecom duopoly on the available cables. The provision of PPC-1 cable in 2009 broke this duopoly and caused the cost of data transmission to fall substantially. Since then due to the obsolete technology used in sections of the network there has been significant consumer dissatisfaction with the service.

=== Network neutrality ===
In 2006 the top three ISPs stated that they did not discriminate between peer-to-peer internet activity and normal internet activity. Peer-to-peer activity is counted towards a customer's limit and if the customer exceeds that limit then they will have their account shaped. However, Unwired and iBurst confirmed at the same time that they do shape peer-to-peer activity to "smooth the flow of data". In 2007 Optus changed their policy so that uploads as well as downloads would be counted towards the customers limit. This has been seen as a move to curb the amount of peer-to-peer activity, since other services which upload such as multiplayer computer games are not counted towards the limit if played through certain servers.

=== IPv6 ===
With the Asia-Pacific Network Information Centre's Geoff Huston stating that IPv4 addresses will be exhausted prior to October 2010, IPv6 was becoming increasingly important in the future of Australian Internet connectivity.

By 2011, despite several companies having applied for allocations of the new addresses, only a small number of organisations had provided retail-IPv6 offerings to their end-customers; Apex Telecom and Internode both claim to being the first to offer IPv6 at a retail level. Wholesalers and Educational Networks had also been supplying IPv6 being PIPE Networks, Vocus and AARNet.

Now though, many providers provide IPv6 retail services to customers including AAPT, Telstra, Optus, Vocus_Group, and VirtuTel.

=== Internet filtering plans ===
On 31 December 2007, Stephen Conroy announced the federal government's intention to censor "inappropriate material" from the Internet. Under the proposed system any Australian who subscribes to an ISP would receive a "clean" version of the Internet. The Federal Government's stated aim is to protect children from accessing violent and pornographic websites. This plan was later abandoned and the Australian government continues to only block websites that violate online laws.

=== National Broadband Network ===
The National Broadband Network was initially a fibre to the home (FTTH) open-access network in planning and trial operation in Australia by the federal government. The national broadband network aimed to provide up to 1000 Mbit/s speeds and to connect to 93% of Australian households and businesses. This has since been revised under a Coalition government to a Mixed-Technology system relying largely on Australia's existing and largely deprecated Copper networks. This revision aims for 25 Mbit/s to 100 Mbit/s, with consumer reports ranging from 1 Mbit/s to 100 Mbit/s. The Australian government had previously called for proposals to build a Fibre to the Node (FTTN) broadband network providing download speeds up to 100 and upload speeds up to 40Megabits per second. The government also utilises fixed wireless technology and satellite technology to provide fast broadband connection in rural and remote areas. Fixed wireless provides speeds up to 50/20 Mbit/s. Satellite technology uses sky muster communication satellite which was launched in October 2015 to provide fast broadband in very remote area. It provides speeds up to 25/5 Mbit/s. The network will be the largest single infrastructure investment in Australia's history. In February 2017, the Federal Government of Australia funded the project for the NBN in order to build a mixed technology network.

== Security ==
=== Cyber attacks ===
In 2016, the government released the cyber security strategy.

In June 2020 prime minister Scott Morrison revealed that Australian organisations, including governments and businesses, and key infrastructure were being targeted by a sophisticated foreign state-based hacker.

In January 2024, Russian hackers launched a major attack on Australian government departments and agencies. This attack, considered Australia's largest government cyberattack to date, resulted in the theft of 2.5 million documents from 65 different government entities. The hackers gained access by infiltrating an Australian law firm that worked with the government.

== Internet censorship ==
Australia is classified as Under Surveillance by Reporters without Borders from 2009 to present.

== Internet surveillance ==
Google's transparency report shows a consistent trend of growth in requests by Australian authorities for private information, constantly rising approximately 20% year-on-year. The most recent published volume for the period ending December 2013 indicates a volume of around four individual requests per calendar day.

Telstra's transparency report for the period 1 July - 31 December 2013 does not include requests by national security agencies, only police and other agencies. Nevertheless, in the six-month period 40,644 requests were made, 36,053 for "Telstra customer information, carriage service records and pre-warrant checks" (name, address, date of birth, service number, call/SMS/internet records. Call records include called party, date, time and duration. Internet information includes date, time and duration of internet sessions and email logs from Telstra-administered addresses), 2,871 for "Life threatening situations and Triple Zero emergency calls", 270 for "Court orders", 1450 for "Warrants for interception or access to stored communications" (real time access): an average of around 222 requests per calendar day.

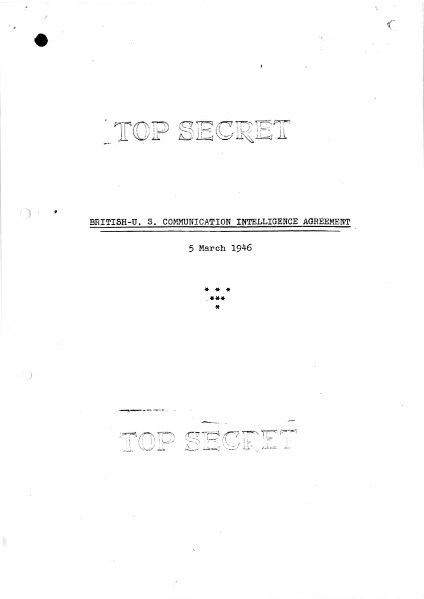
Cover page of the first version of the secret UKUSA Agreement, which was disclosed to the public in 2011, and was the basis for the modern Five Eyes international surveillance alliance

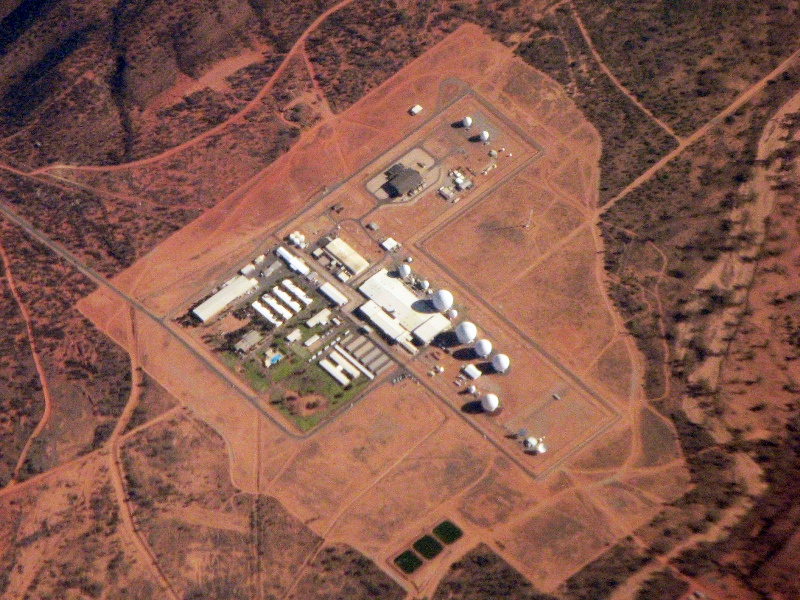
Aerial view of Pine Gap, one of Australia's major spy facilities

In 2013 more than 500 authors including five Nobel prize winners and Australian identities Frank Moorhouse, John Coetzee, Helen Garner, Geraldine Brooks and David Malouf signed a global petition to protest mass surveillance after the whistleblower Edward Snowden's global surveillance disclosures informed the world, including Australians, that they are being monitored by the National Security Agency's XKeyscore system and its boundless informant. Snowden had further revealed that Australian government intelligence agencies, specifically the Australian Signals Directorate, also have access to the system as part of the international Five Eyes surveillance alliance.

In August 2014 it was reported that law-enforcement agencies had been accessing Australians' web browsing histories via internet providers such as Telstra without a warrant (Optus confirmed that they cooperate with law enforcement, and Vodafone did not return a request for comment). The revelations came less than a week after government attempts to increase their surveillance powers through new legislation allowing offensive computer hacking by government intelligence agencies, and mere months after outrage surrounding the government's offer to share personal information about citizens with Five Eyes intelligence partners.

As of August 2014, no warrant is required for organisations to access the so-called 'metadata' information of private parties. This is information regarding "calls and emails sent and received, the location of a phone, internet browsing activity. There is no access to the content of the communication, just how, to or from whom, when and where". Under current law many organisations other than federal, state and territory police and security agencies such as ASIO can get access to this information, including "any agency that collects government revenue", for example the RSPCA, the Australian Crime Commission, the Australian Securities and Investments Commission (though reportedly temporarily removed from the list), the Australian Taxation Office, Centrelink, Medicare, Australia Post, the Australian Fisheries Management Authority, the Victorian Taxi Services Commission, the Victorian Transport Accident Commission, WorkSafe Victoria, local councils and foreign law enforcement agencies.

In the 2013-2014 financial year there were over half a million disclosures of metadata to agencies.

The Australian Communications & Media Authority provides instructions for internet service providers and other telecommunications providers about their law enforcement, national security and interception obligations.

During the 2015-2016 financial year 712 warrants were issued for access to stored communications, 3,857 interception warrants were issued, and 63 enforcement agencies were granted 333,980 authorizations for metadata access.

There's some reports said Australia has been collaborating with Chinese Great Firewall security officials in implementing its data retention and filtering infrastructure and possibly obtained surveillance technology from China.

In 2025, it's been reported that in Australia online services from search engines, to social media apps, to app stores and AI chatbots will have to check users' age, possibly via ID checks.

== Web browsers ==
As of 2024, most used web browsers according to Statcounter were:

Web browser	Market share	Reference
Chrome	54%	
Safari	29%	
Edge	8.3%	
Firefox	3.0%	
Samsung Internet	2.8%	
Opera	1.1%	
Android	0.18%	
360 Safe Browser	0.10%	
Explorer	0.08%	
other	0.33%	

As of 2024, most used web browsers according to Cloudflare were:

Web browser	Market share	Reference
Chrome	53%	
Safari	27%	
Edge	8.9%	
Firefox	4.1%	
Samsung Internet	3.1%	
Opera	0.97%	
Brave	0.97%	
DuckDuckGo Private Browser	0.28%	
AVG Secure Browser	0.05%	
Avast Secure Browser	0.03%	
Aloha Browser	0.02%	
Yandex Browser	0.02%	

== See also ==
- Internet access worldwide
- Telecommunications in Australia
- Internet censorship in Australia
