= Terria (consortium) =

Consortium of Australian Internet service providers

Terria Access Seekers Association
- Type: Consortium
- Industry: Telecommunications
- Founded: July 2006
- Headquarters: Australia
- Area served: Australia
- Key people: Ravi Bhatia; Michael Egan (Chairman); Michael Simmons (Bid Manager)
- Products: Bidding to become a Broadband network service provider
- Owner: Joint venture of Internode Systems, iiNet, Macquarie Telecom, Optus and Primus
- Website: www.terria.com.au

Terria Access Seekers Association, formerly known as G9, was a consortium of Australian Internet service providers that in 2006 formed a consortium to bid for the right to build the proposed National Broadband Network.

== Companies involved ==
The companies involved were Internode Systems, iiNet, Macquarie Telecom, Optus and Primus.

Absent from the list was Telstra.

== Purpose ==
Terria came about in response to a proposal from Telstra to build a Fibre to the node (FTTN) communications network around Australia. The consortium (which at the time comprised eight companies — iiNet was yet to join) responded that the new network would lock out all competitors and would only provide speeds that were achievable with the existing infrastructure. They proposed an alternate open network that with Telstra's participation would have covered a larger percentage of the population and allowed open competition for the same cost. Telstra refused, and apparently due to regulatory issues, abandoned their original plan.

== History ==
In December 2006, the group announced their intention to combine to invest in a Fibre To The Node network. They lodged a special access undertaking regarding pricing policy with the Australian Competition & Consumer Commission (ACCC) in June 2007.

In December 2007, the ACCC rejected the plan due to a lack of incentives for providers of the service to compete.

In May 2008, the consortium, upon its rebranding to Terria, placed the 5 million dollar bond to take part in the tender process to develop the national broadband network promised by the Rudd Government.

On 2008-11-26, Optus Networks Investments lodged a bid to build the National Broadband Network, on behalf of the Terria consortium.

On 7 April 2009, the Australian Government terminated the National Broadband Network tender, opting to instead build the network on its own.

On 15 September 2009, it was announced that Terria would reform and put out the call for new members to join the fight in ensuring the government's $43 billion national broadband network becomes a reality.

=== Former partners ===
Powertel was an original member of the G9, but was acquired by AAPT – another original member - with the rebranding of the consortium to Terria reflecting that change. AAPT itself subsequently left the consortium on 16 October 2008 to become an independent voice on the network build.

On 24 October, Soul also chose to leave the consortium. Terria's chairman, Michael Egan, claimed that Soul had not been an active participant in the consortium since its merger with TPG.

On 27 October, TransACT announced their departure from the consortium, citing their focus on their own individual bid to build the National Broadband Network within the Australian Capital Territory and possible conflict of interest should they win with their own bid. In light of the series of departures, the CEOs of the remaining five members of the consortium reiterated their support for Terria.
