= Unicell =

Unicell or Unicel may refer to:

- Unicel, an American brand of mobile-phone service
- Unicell Limited, a Canadian company that worked with Purolator on a prototype electric vehicle
- Unicell, a mobile network operator in Maine acquired by Powertel in 1993

== See also ==
- Unicellular organism, a living organism made up of one cell
