= MAQ =

MAQ could refer to:

- Macquarie Technology Group (ASX stock symbol: MAQ)
- Mae Sot Airport in Thailand, (IATA code: MAQ)
- Mangalore Central railway station (Station code: MAQ)
- Martinique, UNDP country code
- Medical Anthropology Quarterly, an international peer-reviewed academic journal
- Museum of the American Quilter's Society
- Marcel's Acceptance Quotient (MAQ)
