= Simon Hackett =

Australian technology entrepreneur

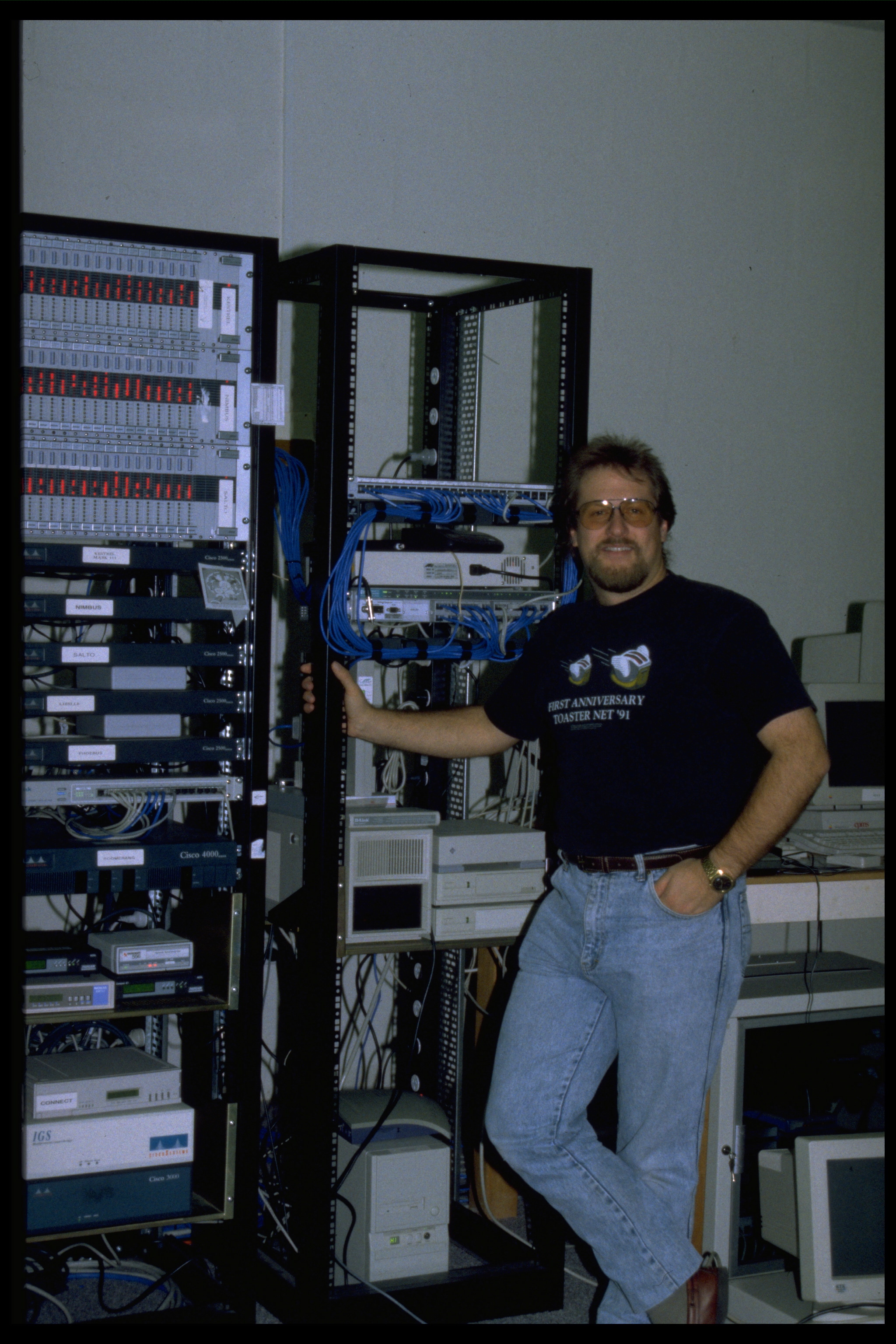
- Simon Hackett in 1996
- Education: University of Adelaide (B.S.)
- Known for: Founder and managing director of Internode Pty Ltd; Consumer rights advocacy; Commentator

Simon Walter Hackett is an Australian technology entrepreneur. He is the co-founder (with Robyn Taylor) of Internode, an Australian national broadband services company.

== Career ==
He is a 1986 graduate of the University of Adelaide, holding a bachelor's degree in Applied Mathematics and Computer Science.

Together with John Romkey, Hackett became the first to connect a commercial domestic appliance (a Sunbeam Deluxe Automatic Radiant Control Toaster) to the internet in 1990.

Internode was founded in May 1991. In 1997 Hackett founded a subsidiary called Agile Communications that was a licensed national telecommunications carrier and was the first South Australian based company to gain this license.

The Internode company group was sold to iiNet in a A$105 million transaction announced in December 2011 and completed on 31 January 2012.

Hackett departed the executive team at Internode to join the board of iiNet in August 2012. On 12 November 2013 it was announced that he had been appointed to the board of the National Broadband Network, and that he had resigned his position with iiNet. He departed the board of the National Broadband Network in April 2016 and was replaced by Michael Malone.

Other boards Hackett has served upon are: Adelaide Fringe Festival, m.Net Corporation., and the Australian Network for Art and Technology. Hackett co-founded and is a former director of The Internet Society of Australia, and was the founding president of the South Australian Internet Association (which has since been disbanded).

He is a fellow of the Australian Computer Society.

While he was Managing Director of Internode, he was frequently active in the Internode forum on Whirlpool, and is a vocal commentator on Australian telecommunications competition issues and Government policies.

Hackett is the largest investor in ASX-listed company Redflow, has served on its board (including as Chairman) and also spent a period as the company CEO before hiring others into both of those roles. Hackett stepped down from the Redflow board effective at the 2018 AGM, while remaining involved in a technical role as Systems Integration Architect.

Hackett is an advocate for electric vehicles. He imported the first Tesla Roadster into Australia and documented the process of driving it 501 kilometres (311 mi) on a single charge during the Global Green Challenge in Australia in 2009. This was reported to be a new world range record for a production electric car at the time. He subsequently appeared in testimonial for Tesla.
