= National Broadband Network =

Telecommunications network in Australia

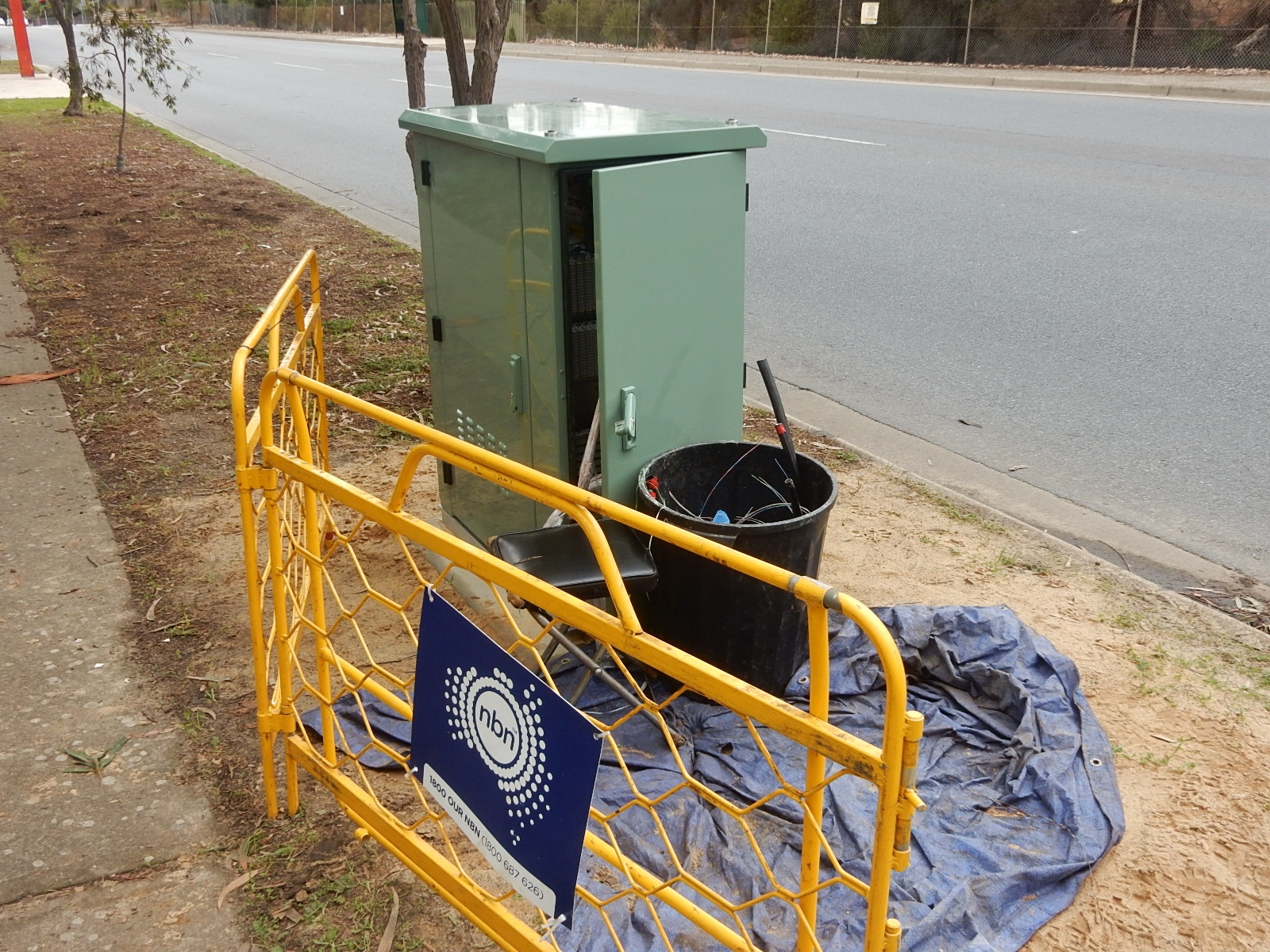
An NBN FTTN (fibre to the node) cabinet during installation

The National Broadband Network (NBN) is Australia's national wholesale open-access data network. It includes wired and radio communication components rolled out and operated by NBN Co, a government-owned corporation. Internet service providers, known under NBN as retail service providers (or RSPs), contract with NBN to access the data network and sell fixed Internet access to end users.

Rationales for this national telecommunications infrastructure project included replacing the existing copper cable telephony network that is approaching end of life, (Note: For example, most of Australia's copper network is affected by water due to extensive use of faulty gel for insulation in the past.) and the rapidly growing demand for Internet access. As initially proposed by the Rudd government in 2009, wired connections would have provided up to 100 Mbit/s (later increased to 1000 Mbit/s), although this was decreased to a minimum of 25 Mbit/s in 2013 after the election of the Abbott government.

As the most expensive single infrastructure project in Australia's history, NBN was the subject of significant political contention and has been an issue in federal elections. The Liberal government initially stated that the "Multi-Technology Mix" (MTM) would be completed by 2016, however this was changed after the election to 2019 and then again to 2020. The project cost jumped from the Liberal Party's estimated $29.5 billion before the 2013 federal election, to $46–56 billion afterwards. In 2016 NBN Co. said it was on target for $49 billion, but by late 2018 the estimated final cost was $51 billion.

== History ==
=== 2007 ===
A fast broadband initiative was announced in the run-up to the 2007 federal election by the Labor opposition with an estimated cost of A$15 billion including a government contribution of $4.7 billion that would be raised in part by selling the Federal Government's remaining shares in Telstra.

The Labor Party Rudd government was elected on 24 November 2007 and initial planning commenced.

The NBN was originally to deliver its wholesale service through fibre to the node (FTTN) and reach approximately 98% of premises in Australia by June 2016. A new satellite network would be built to reach the rest of the country.

=== 2008 ===
An initial request for proposal (RFP) to build the NBN was issued but not executed. Organisations lodging compliant proposals were neither able to meet the requirements nor able to raise the necessary capital. A non-compliant proposal was received from Telstra and they were excluded from consideration.

=== 2009 ===
The Rudd government announced it would bypass the existing copper network by constructing a new national network combining fibre to the premises (FTTP), fixed wireless and satellite technologies. The first Rudd government had proposed to develop a modern optical fibre telecommunications network to provide broadband access to 93% of the Australian population at 100 Mbit/s, with those areas and people outside the network footprint to be provided broadband access through fixed wireless and geosynchronous telecommunications satellite.

The cost estimate rose to $43 billion and later revised to $37.4 billion. The project was to be financed by a combination of a Federal Government investment of $30.4 billion and private investment for the remainder.

Dividends were to be paid after completion in 2021 to the federal government, with the government's contribution repaid by 2034. A return on investment of 7.1% was expected on revenue of $23.1 billion by 2021.

Tasmania was selected for a trial deployment based on the Tasmanian Government's submission to the RFP. A forced structural separation of Telstra was threatened but not completed. NBN Co was established on 9 April 2009 and Mike Quigley appointed chief executive officer on 25 July.

=== 2010 ===
An implementation study was commissioned in April 2009 and released on 6 May. In April, NBN Co issued a request for tender (RFT) for the major FTTP rollout. Fourteen vendors submitted a proposal; however, NBN Co suspended the process on 1 April 2011, as the prices were unacceptably high. The first FTTP customers were connected in July 2010.

The Gillard government was elected at the 2010 Australian federal election. As a minority government priority was given to regional and rural areas, areas from which supporting cross-bench MPs were elected. An increase in the peak speed to one gigabit per second was announced in response to Google Fiber developments in the USA. After the election Opposition Leader Tony Abbott appointed Malcolm Turnbull as Shadow Minister for Communications and Broadband, stating that he believed the NBN to be a white elephant and that Turnbull had "the technical expertise and business experience to entirely demolish the government on this issue".

NBN Co's business plan was released on 20 December 2010, including forecasts and network design incorporating these priorities. Tasmania was selected as the first state for a three-stage trial FTTP rollout. Stage one was announced in July 2009. The first customers were connected a year later. Stages two and three were announced on 21 October 2009 and 1 March 2010, respectively.

Under the 2010 NBN Co corporate plan, it was estimated that the NBN construction would require A$27.5 billion in government equity and raise an estimated A$13.4 billion in debt funding without government support; a total funding requirement of A$40.9 billion up to FY2021. Financial forecasts for NBN Co assuming a 7% internal rate of return (IRR) expect the government and debt equity will be fully repaid including accrued interest by FY2040.

==== Redesign ====
Originally, NBN Co planned for a centralised model with only 14 points of interconnect (PoIs); however, that was overruled by the Federal Government on the advice from the Australian Competition & Consumer Commission (ACCC). The ACCC considered the plan to be "mission creep" and would have given NBN Co a monopoly over backhaul; however, NBN Co said centralised model would have allowed smaller RSPs to connect without going through a wholesale aggregator. ACCC recommended 121 PoIs after public consultation.

Internode criticised the "insane" number of POIs and after its pricing announcement warned it might have to charge more in regional areas because of the increased costs. In response Turnbull said the "government can't deliver on a crucial promise" of "national uniform pricing"; however, Minister for Communications, Stephen Conroy said that they "guaranteed uniform wholesale pricing" not retail pricing.

Internode (in 2010) warned that increasing the number of POIs was likely to lead to consolidation in the ISP industry. Following this warning the industry consolidated, resulting in four major RSPs (Telstra, Optus, TPG Telecom and Vocus Communications) who accounted for the majority of the market share.

=== 2011 ===
The Parliament passed the National Broadband Network Companies Act 2011 and a related bill on 28 March. The RFT of April 2010 was suspended process on 1 April 2011, as the prices were unacceptably high.

NBN Co contracted with Ericsson on 1 June to design, build and operate the network with options to extend the contract for up to 10 years at a total cost of $1.1 billion. Construction commenced in 2011, with the first five locations announced as the regional and rural communities surrounding Geraldton, Toowoomba, Tamworth, Ballarat and Darwin.

NBN Co entered into an agreement worth up to $380 million with Silcar on 1 June. The agreement covered the construction of the NBN in Queensland, New South Wales and the ACT by Silcar, a company joint-owned by Siemens and Thiess. The agreement includes the option of a two-year extension with an additional value of $740 million.

NBN Co signed an agreement with Telstra on 23 June estimated to be worth $9 billion post-tax net present value, building upon the signing of a financial heads of agreement a year beforehand. Telstra was not required to separate retail and wholesale operations, instead agreeing to disconnect its Internet customers from the copper and hybrid fibre-coaxial networks in areas where FTTP has been installed and agreed to lease dark fibre, exchange space and ducts to NBN Co. Telstra would not be able to market their mobile network as an alternative to the NBN for a number of years.

NBN Co signed an agreement with Optus on 23 June estimated to be worth $800 million post-tax net present value over its hybrid fibre-coaxial network.

Following low take-up rates in Tasmania, the government adopted an opt-out model in which users are assumed to want the service unless they explicitly opt-out. Fourteen second-release sites comprising 54,000 premises in all states and territories were announced on 8 July 2010 with construction commencing in August.

Telstra allowed NBN Co to use its exchanges and ducts in the second release sites before agreement with Telstra was finalised.

==== Interim satellite service ====
NBN Co launched interim satellite services on 1 July, providing up to six megabits per second. Due to the limited satellite capacity, these services were given to customers who did not have access to alternative "metro comparable" services, similar to the Federal Government's Australian Broadband Guarantee (ABG) program which ended on 30 June. The criteria for alternative "metro comparable" services were minimum data speeds of at least 512 kilobits per second, a 3 GB per month data allowance and a total price to the end customer of no more than $2,500 over three years. To provide these services NBN Co bought managed satellite services and satellite capacity from Optus for $200 million and additional satellite capacity from IPstar for $100 million.

Five areas comprising around 14,000 premises were chosen as the "first mainland sites", each representing rollout challenges the NBN expected to face during an Australia-wide rollout. The first services went live on 19 April 2011.

=== 2012 ===
Attorney-General Nicola Roxon blocked Huawei from seeking a supply contract for the National Broadband Network, on the advice of the Australian Security Intelligence Organisation. The Australian government feared Huawei would provide backdoor access for Chinese cyber espionage.

Significant attacks were made by the Liberal/National Coalition opposition leading up to the 2013 election. These focused on the estimated cost and timeline for implementation. The build cost had been a key point of debate. Turnbull and Abbott stated that they would take an "agnostic" approach. They argued that the demand for such a service was not significant, (Note: Statements by Abbott and Turnbull on the need for broadband: Turnbull stated that 12 Mbit/s would adequately address the need.; Abbott argued a national LTE network could meet the need, with a tower on every street corner) and thus that the estimated cost was too high and the timeline for implementation was too long.

=== 2013 ===
The Multi-Technology Mix (MTM) was selected as the approach to broadband provision by the Liberal–National coalition in the lead up to the 2013 Australian federal election. That is, response to what the coalition stated to be excessive performance specifications and costs they moved from a model which previously focused on FTTP (fibre to the premises) to a multi-technology mix model using FTTx, including FTTP, FTTN (fibre to the node), FTTB (fibre to the building or basement) and most recently FTTdp (fibre to the distribution point); and HFC (hybrid fibre coaxial) in metropolitan areas. Regional and remote areas were mainly unchanged as a result of the strategic review and typically receive a service using either fixed wireless, using LTE technology, or satellite.

After the 2013 election, the Abbott government announced immediate changes to the NBN: most of the NBN Co board was asked to resign; Ziggy Switkowski was appointed chairman; and rollout was moved from FTTP to "alternative technologies" such as fibre to the node. The government limited the rollout of FTTP to those areas already in development. Later implementation of the Multi-Technological Mix (MTM) began with the promise of earlier completion and significant cost savings compared to the earlier approach. The predominant change was the adoption of a mixed copper-optical technology with fibre to the node (FTTN). Studies and a strategic review were commissioned. (Note: Reports and audit into the NBN commissioned by the Abbott government in 2013: "Broadband Availability and Quality Report". 20 February 2014.; Scales, Bill (7 March 2014). "Independent audit of the NBN public policy process looking at the public policy processes that led to the establishment of the NBN in the period April 2008 – May 2010".; "Media Release: Independent audit of the NBN public policy process". Department of Communications and the Arts. 7 March 2014.; Independent cost‐benefit analysis of broadband and review of regulation; "Volume I – National Broadband Network Market and Regulatory Report". 26 June 2015.; "Volume II –The costs and benefits of high-speed broadband" (PDF). 27 August 2014.)

As of 3 November 2013, construction of the network had passed 354,793 premises and 109,862 customer services were active. In areas where the FTTP network was rolled out, a similar agreement with Optus was in place.

Following the election of the Abbott government, NBN Co reassessed financial forecasts and progress of the NBN roll-out and published a strategic review in December 2013. On 12 December, the NBN Co board appointed Bill Morrow as NBN Co's new CEO, replacing Quigley. Telstra asserted its intention to retain the $11bn value it generates from the previous government's deal.

Delays occurred when work was stopped for several weeks on sites where asbestos was found in Telstra pits. Turnbull announced the MTM approach promising significant savings and earlier completion. The MTM added fibre to the node (FTTN) as the preferred technology; and kept hybrid fibre-coaxial (HFC) (previously planned to be shut down).

=== 2014 ===
In April 2014, The Australian newspaper judged the Tasmania rollout as shambolic and abysmal. The final MTM approach was finalised. Initial costs and timing for the Coalition NBN were $29.5 billion of public funding to construct by 2019.

In May NBN announced that it would be targeting premises that were already serviced with fibre by rival TPG.

=== 2015 ===
Quigley publicly attacked the NBN and the MTM, noting cost blowouts and delays that he said were the fault of changes made by the Coalition government.

As of 30 June, 1,011,973 premises were able to order services, 571,527 brown fields. 180,796 greenfields premises were able to order fixed-line services, 220,917 fixed wireless, and 38,743 interim satellite service. 485,615 users were active. As of 31 March, 64,102 premises of the 722,031 premises passed were classed as being "service class zero"—"the Service Class that applies to a Premises that is not NBN Serviceable for the purposes of the NFAS but is in the footprint of the NBN Co Fibre Network."

=== 2016 ===
Turnbull became Prime Minister and Mitch Fifield became the Minister for Communications.

At 30 June, NBN Co had passed 2,893,474 premises across all technologies. Company annual revenue was $421 million compared to $164 million in 2015 financial year, with approximately 1,100,000 active user at 30 June.

NBN Co found no significant demand for wired connections above 25 Mbit/s (despite public surveys indicating otherwise) and upgrading the network would not be considered until demand for high-bandwidth services was proven.

=== 2017 ===
A 2017 report by the Joint Standing Committee on NBN found significant technology issues and company performance. All but one of the Coalition members of the committee released a dissenting report strongly defending the NBN and NBN Co.

In 2017, Morrow wrote a public blog post arguing that the New Zealand program Ultra-Fast Broadband operated in a different policy setting, with Telecom New Zealand separated into Chorus (wholesale) and Spark (retail). On 23 October, Turnbull said, "The NBN was a calamitous train wreck of a project when we came into government in 2013," and argued that the NBN might never make a profit.

Turnbull commented on New Zealand's program "They basically ensured the incumbent telco, the Telstra equivalent, split its network operations away from its retail operations. And then that network company in effect became the NBN. The virtue of that was you actually had a business that knew what it was doing, that was up and running, that had 100 years of experience getting on with the job."

Morrow admitted that 15% of end users receive poor service through NBN and are "seriously dissatisfied". In addition, Morrow indicated that in July, prices and performance for end users were suppressed through a "price war" between RSPs. However, despite this comment, the Telecommunications Industry Ombudsman released its annual reporting showing a 159% increase in NBN complaints with nearly 40% of NBN customers dissatisfied.

In response to the imminent broadcast of a critical documentary, Turnbull stated that NBN was a failure, but blaming the earlier Rudd and Gillard governments. The documentary noted significant issues with the rollout and complaints regarding performance of the NBN. Following the Prime Minister's acknowledgment of the NBN's failure, Rudd noted that, on assuming government in 2013, Turnbull, as Minister for Communications in the Abbott government, radically changed the network's technical aspects.

The ACCC began an inquiry into the NBN in November 2017, to investigate whether regulation was needed to improve outcomes for consumers. In November 2017 NBN Co temporarily suspended the rollout of its HFC network due to performance issues, costing Telstra close to $600 million AUD of its 2018 profits.

=== 2018 ===
In February 2018, Turnbull was criticised for connecting The Lodge to the NBN using FTTC technology while neighbours had FTTN, and for having a 100 Mbit/s plan, when he had previously stated that most Australians would not need those speeds. During the South Australia state election, Jay Weatherill promised funding for an alternative network for Adelaide if re-elected.

=== 2019 ===
In April 2019, the ACCC released a report stating that consumers were paying more for basic internet access under the NBN than they were for ADSL plans under the same speeds. Mark Gregory of RMIT University estimated that to return the NBN to all-fibre similar to the initial plan would cost between $16 billion and $20 billion over five to ten years.

NBN Co's chief executive Stephen Rue announced in August 2019 that the $51 billion project would be completed within budget by June 2020. At the time of the announcement, the network was 85% complete.

In December 2019, Speedtest.net ranked Australia 68th globally in terms of internet speed, a decline of three places from the year before and the fourth-slowest in the OECD, while being under the global average.

=== 2020 ===
In February 2020, Rue announced that the network was 90% complete. He also reaffirmed his August 2019 announcement that the project would be completed within budget by June 2020.

In September 2020, the Coalition announced a $4.5 billion upgrade to the NBN, planning to bring faster internet speeds to up to 8 million people, a move seen as a backflip from the Liberals after campaigning for seven years against Labor's original NBN's plan consisting of FTTP.

=== 2025 ===
In January 2025, the Albanese Labor Government announced a $4 billion measure that by 2030 would finish overbuilding 95% of the residences served by the FTTN copper to enable the ordering of upgrades the full speed FTTP fibre.

Residential wholesale speeds were increased from 14 September 2025 on the FTTP and HFC network; this included the first release of 2 Gigabits per second (Gbps) download plans, labelled as "NBN Hyperfast". The highest speed for residential connections became 2000/200 Mbit/s (Download/Upload) on FTTP and 2000/100 on HFC with both requiring a new network termination device. Other tiers to change included the 100/20 tier increasing to 500/50, the 250/25 tier increasing to 750/50, and the 1000/50 tier having its upload speed increased to 1000/100. The commercial grade Enterprise Ethernet service was simplified to five symmetrical up/down tiers of 500, 1000, 2000, 5000 and 10000 Mbit/s. Beginning in July 2027, NBN Co will begin forcing existing FTTN users to upgrade to an FTTP connection, as it seeks to phase out the copper network and MTM promoted by previous Liberal governments.

== Infrastructure ==
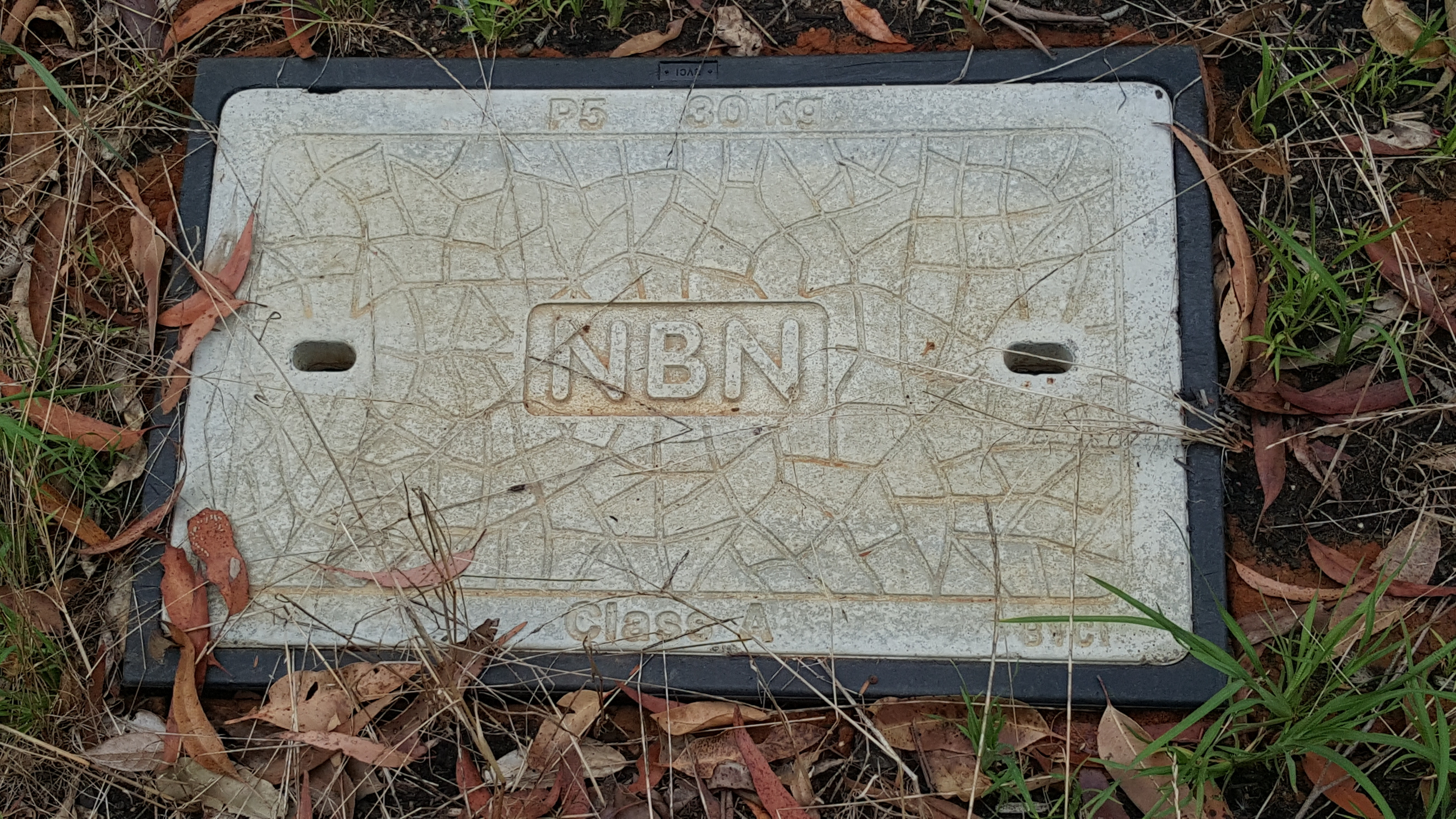
A concrete pit cover for an underground NBN service

=== Point of interconnect (POI) ===
Diagram showing how retail service providers and wholesalers connect to the NBN

Networks managed by individual RSPs connect to the main NBN infrastructure through points of interconnect (POIs). There are 121 POIs across the country, housed inside Telstra-owned telephone exchanges. Not all exchanges contain POIs – data which reaches a non-POI exchange is transmitted to the closest POI through the NBN transit network. POIs provide Layer 2 network access to the backhaul networks managed by RSPs, thus they act as a "handover point" between NBN and RSP infrastructure.

=== Network termination device (NTD) ===
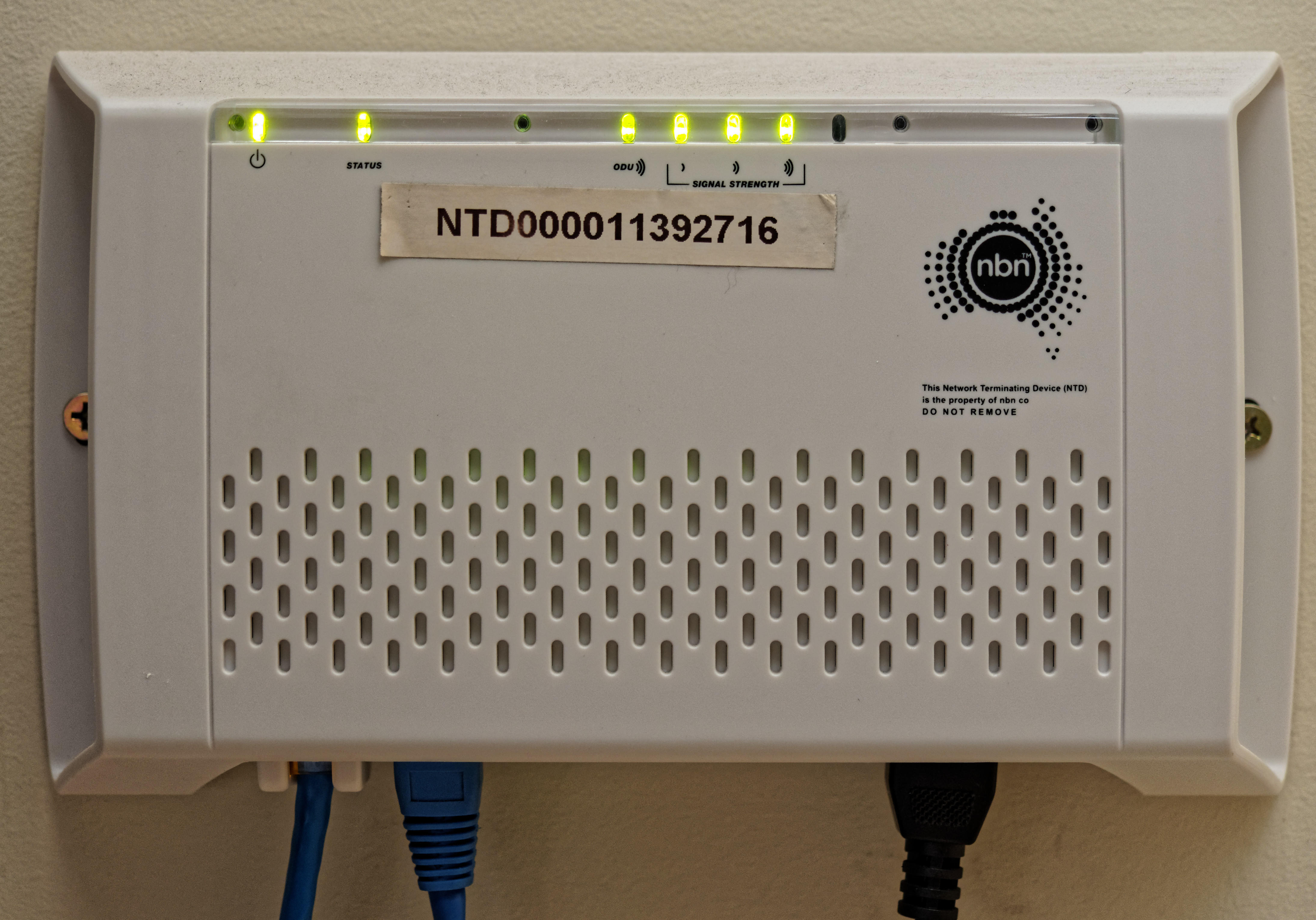
Network Termination Device for fixed wireless

A network termination device (NTD) is a customer-side network interface device which provides multiple bridges for customers to access the NBN. There are different types of NTDs for the various technologies. All connection types but FTTN use NTDs on premises. Depending on the kind of link, NTDs typically provide two telephony and four data channels. An external power source is required, and an uninterruptible power supply (UPS) can be used to maintain connection in power outages (battery backups are available for the FTTP NTD). FTTC requires power to be provided from the premises to the kerb (distribution point).

NTDs provide user–network interface (UNI) connections for connection of in-premises devices, typically though multiple modular jacks. The NTD cannot be used as a Layer 3 router for in-premises networking.

== NBN technologies ==
A schematic (not to scale) illustrating how FTTx architectures vary with regard to the distance between the optical fibre and the end-user. The building on the left is the telephone exchange; the buildings on the right are served by the exchange. Dotted rectangles represent separate living or business spaces within the same building.

The NBN network includes a range of connection technologies for both wired communication (copper, fibre optic, and hybrid fibre-coaxial) and radio communication (satellite and fixed wireless). RSPs connect to these networks at points of interconnect. Access to mobile telecommunication backhauls is also sold to mobile telecommunications providers.

Detailed network design rules as required by the Special Access Undertaking agreed by NBN Co and the Australian Competition and Consumer Commission were released on 19 December 2011, with updates on 18 September 2012, 30 June 2016 and 30 June 2017.

The NBN "Multi Technology Mix" (MTM) consists of the following network technologies:

- Wired:
  - Fibre to the node (FTTN) – A mix of copper and fibre optic technology, providing most NBN connections. The maximum download speed is approximately 100Mbps.
  - Fibre to the curb (FTTC) – Previously called fibre to the distribution point (FTTdp). Fibre connection to a communications pit on the street, then copper to the premises. Replacing Optus HFC from 2017. Also known as fibre to the pit. The maximum download speed is approximately 100 Mbps.
  - Fibre to the building (FTTB) – Used for multi-dwelling units and apartment blocks. Equivalent to FTTN, with the "node" located inside the building's communications room. Also known as fibre to the basement. The maximum download speed is approximately 100 Mbps.
  - Fibre to the premises (FTTP) – Fibre optic connection using a gigabit passive optical network. Available for greenfield development. The maximum download speed is approximately 2000 Mbps.
  - Hybrid fibre-coaxial (HFC) – Uses a mix of fibre optic and CATV technology largely built on Telstra's HFC network. The maximum download speed is approximately 2000 Mbps.
- Wireless:
  - Fixed wireless
  - Satellite – Sky Muster telecommunications satellites

In all technologies, voice services may be provided through Voice over IP with a suitable modem. FTTN and FTTP connections support direct connection of an analog telephone.

=== Fibre to the curb (FTTC) ===
Previously known as fibre to the distribution point (FTTdp).

Customers access the FTTC network through copper connections using existing phone plugs. (Note: Plugs may be either 600 series or UNI-D (RJ45, properly 8P8C).) An NBN-provided mains-powered FTTC connection device provides one Ethernet port for connection to a router.

FTTC is typically used where an optical fibre cable is already close to each home or business. It is connected to the existing copper lines via a small distribution point unit (DPU) located near the property boundary inside a pit on the street. Each DPU can service up to four connections. The DPU is powered through an NBN-provided mains-powered FTTC connection device (a type of NTD) in each connected premises.

=== Fibre to the node (FTTN) ===
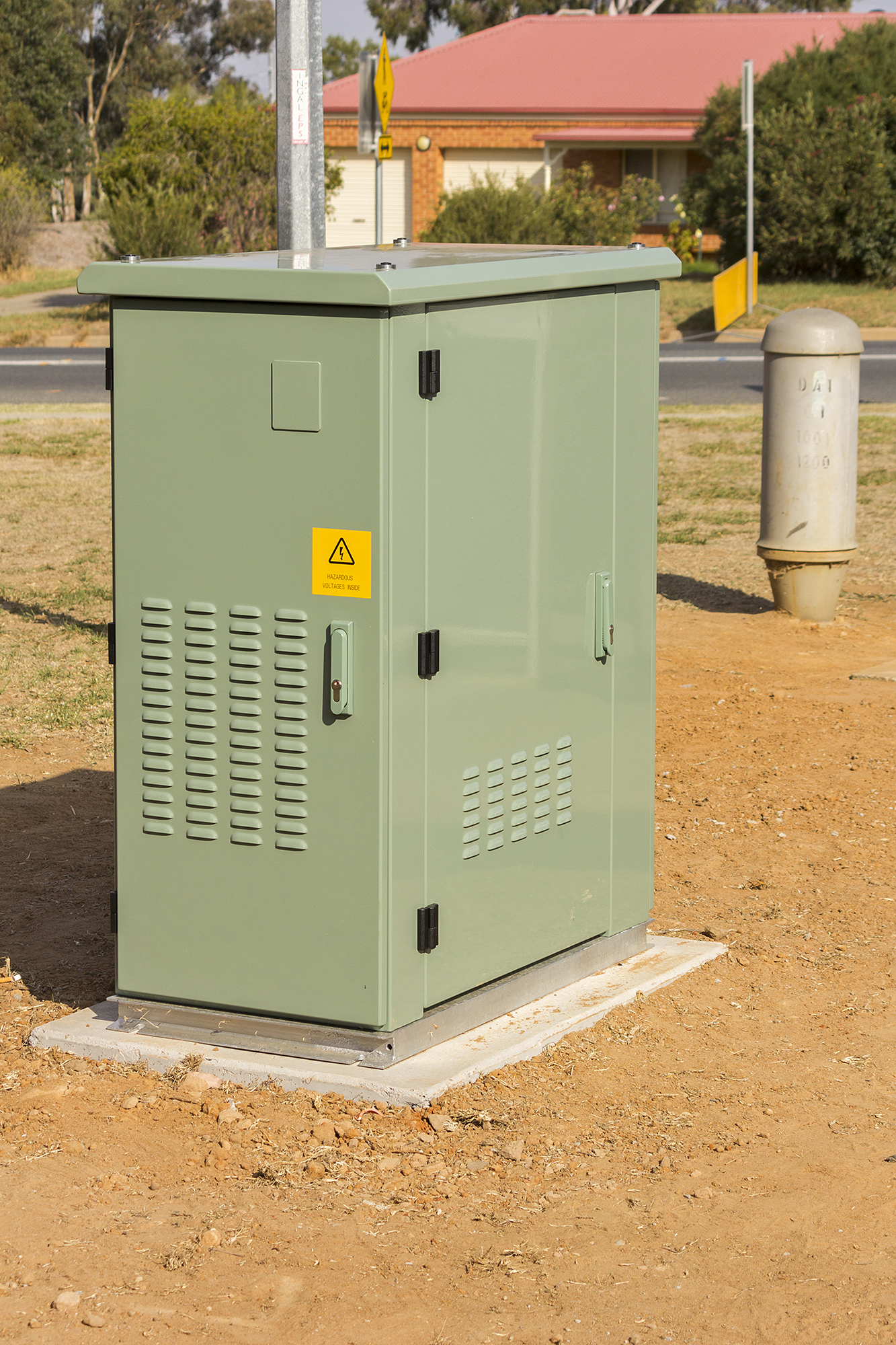
An NBN fibre-to-the-node cabinet, located near a distribution area pillar

Existing copper connections are maintained with existing plugs being used. The end-user accesses the network using a VDSL2 modem, typically purchased from an RSP.

The FTTN network consists of optical fibre from the exchange to a node and a run of copper from the node to the existing distribution area (DA) pillars. A copper pair then runs to each premises. Each node can serve up to 384 homes.

=== Fibre to the premises (FTTP) ===
Diagram of the NBN FTTP network

Fibre-to-the-premises (FTTP) connects customers using Ethernet over a gigabit passive optical network (GPON) from the POI to the premises, giving a peak speed of one gigabit per second. Initially the preferred technological solution, it is an option for greenfield development with limited use for new or replacement connections.

In customer premises, the NTD provides user-network interface connections through registered jack sockets for voice (UNI-V, RJ11) and modular jacks for data (UNI-D, RJ45). Voice services can be provided through either UNI-V (which provides for support for emulated Plain Old Telephone Services or POTS), or UNI-D jack (through Voice over IP through data jacks). UNI-V services are also VoIP - the UNI-V port the user interface to a VoIP ATA inside the NTD, which avoids the need for the RSP or user to provide their own VoIP hardware. Configuration of the UNI-V ATA is managed by the RSP via NBN systems.

Data networking in the premises requires a router and/or wireless access point.

==== Network structure ====
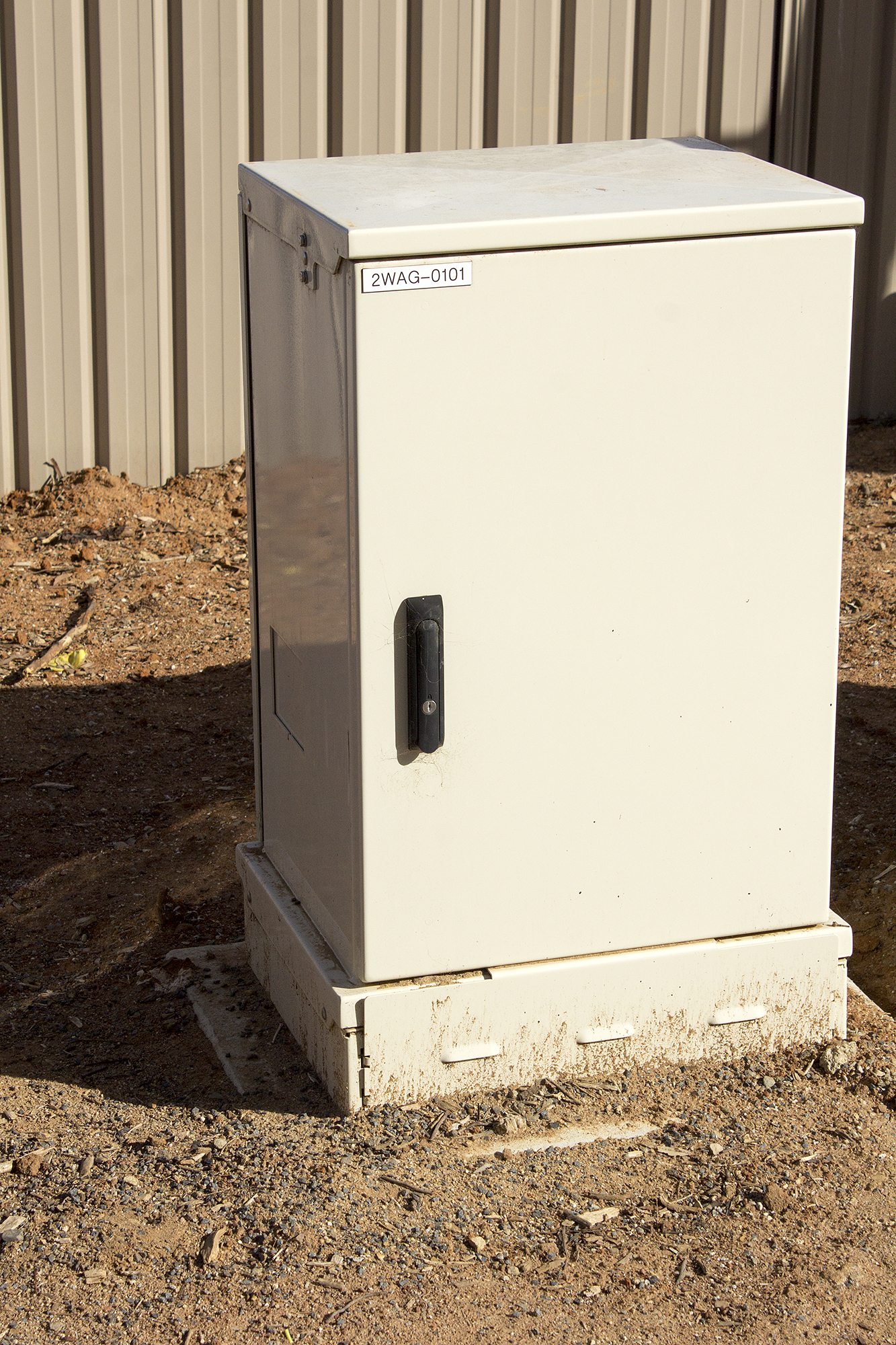
NBN fibre distribution hub (FDH)

A "drop fibre" fibre-optic cable runs from the premises to a "local network" which links a number of premises to a splitter in a fibre distribution hub. A "distribution fibre" cable connects the splitter in the distribution hub to a fibre access node (FAN), which is connected to a POI. Only the fibre access nodes and the equipment on premises require a power supply.

The FTTP network is divided into a number of geographical modules. A fibre distribution area includes up to 576 premises linked through a fibre distribution hub. A fibre serving area module comprises 16 fibre distribution areas, which services up to approximately 9,200 premises. A fibre serving area comprises 12 fibre serving area modules connected to a fibre access node, which services up to 110,400 premises. NBN Co planned to build or lease approximately 980 fibre serving areas, servicing up to 37,632,000 premises. Although this figure will continue to change over team as greenfields areas served by FTTP are created, and formerly FTTN and FTTC areas are converted to FTTP.

=== Hybrid fibre-coaxial (HFC) ===
Hybrid fibre-coaxial is a legacy technology purchased by NBN Co from Telstra and Optus. The Telstra HFC network is being maintained – it was found that the Optus HFC network was uneconomic to bring up to an acceptable standard, with these connections now to be provided by FTTC.

HFC connections use a DOCSIS cable modem as their NTD. The upgrade path for Telstra HFC-connected premises is DOCSIS 3.1.

=== Fixed wireless ===
2,600 transmission towers connected by microwave and optical fibre to exchanges will use TD-LTE 4G mobile broadband technology to cover around 500,000 premises in rural areas. The premises in the fixed wireless area were to be fitted with a roof-mounted antenna allowing a connection to a wireless base station. NBN Co provides a modem with four UNI-D ports. Telephone connections are by VOIP. Where a copper connection is available users requiring connections during electrical power outages are encouraged to keep that.

==== Network structure ====
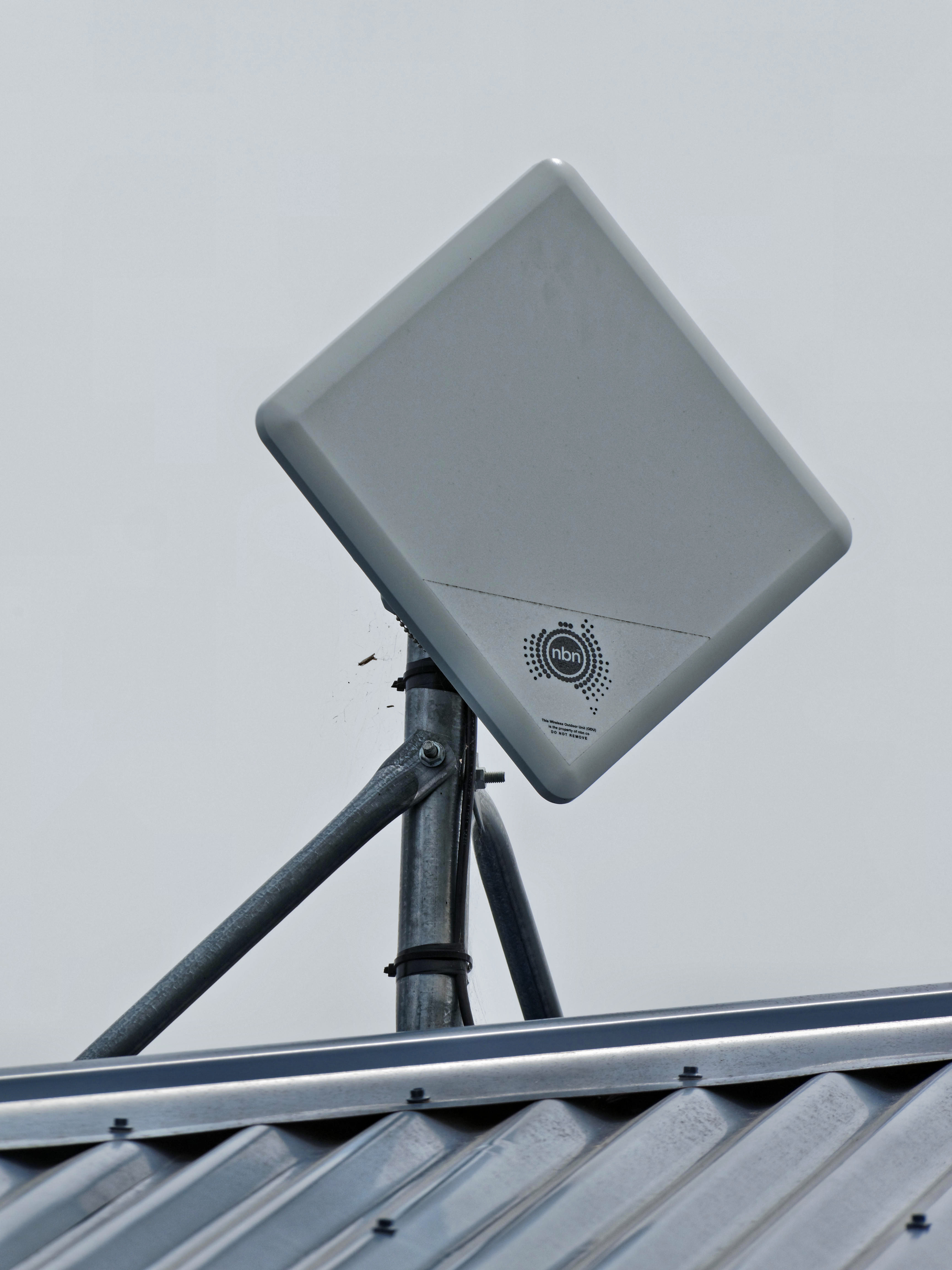
External antenna (ODU) for fixed wireless

A 4G LTE fixed wireless network was to link premises to a base station in turn linked to a POI via a backhaul. During 2023 and 2024 this network is evolving to using 5G point-to-point radio links for increased service bandwidth.

The 2.3 GHz and 3.4 GHz spectrums were to be used to deliver these fixed wireless services covering approximately 4 per cent of the non-fibre population. Unlike the mobile networks, only premises can connect to NBN's fixed wireless network.

2,600 transmission towers connected by optical fibre to exchanges will provide TD-LTE 4G mobile broadband technology to cover around 500,000 premises. The number of premises assigned to each base station was to be limited to ensure users received "good service" with adequate throughput. Users at the edge of the coverage for each base station were to receive a peak speed of 12 megabits per second. The speed increases "considerably" closer to the base station.

=== Satellite service ===
Two Sky Muster satellites provide NBN services to locations outside the reach of other technologies, including Christmas Island, Lord Howe and Norfolk Islands.

A satellite dish is installed on the premises with NBN Co providing an NTD with four UNI-D ports. Where a copper connection is available users requiring connections during electrical power outages are encouraged to keep that.

==== Sky Muster satellite network ====
NBN Co contracted Space Systems/Loral to build and launch two geostationary K_{a} band satellites in 2015 at a total cost of A$2 billion, each offering eighty gigabits per second of bandwidth. The first satellite called Sky Muster (NBN-Co 1A) was launched on 1 October 2015.

Each K_{a} band satellite offers eighty gigabits per second of bandwidth. The satellites bounce signals from a satellite dish on the premises to an earth station, known as a "gateway"; the gateway is then connected to a POI via a fibre backhaul. The satellite design was "not easy", because the required coverage is about "five per cent of the world's land mass" containing "at least 200,000 premises" spread across "over 7,000 kilometres" of area between Cocos Islands and Norfolk Island.

Sky Muster I (NBN-Co 1A) was launched on 1 October 2015 from the Guiana Space Centre in French Guiana, South America, alongside Argentina's ARSAT-2, on an Ariane 5ECA rocket. It became operational in April 2016.

Sky Muster II (NBN-Co 1B) was launched on 5 October 2016 to operate in geostationary orbit of 145° East.

=== Technology Choice Program ===
The "Technology Choice Program" provides the option for areas and users to upgrade the technology of their connection (all except HFC connections). Individual premises may switch from any FTTx technology to FTTP. Areas are able to switch from:

- FTTB to FTTP
- FTTN to FTTP
- Fixed wireless to FTTP
- Fixed wireless to FTTN
- Fixed wireless to FTTB
- Satellite to Fixed wireless
- Satellite to FTTP
- Satellite to FTTN
- Satellite to FTTB

The Technology Choice Program had limited take-up as of 23 March 2017 with 221 applications received; 113 proceeded to obtaining a quote, and 30 upgrading their connection at an average cost of A$7,395.

== End-user issues ==
A variety of issues have confronted NBN end users.

=== Performance ===
NBN end users have had difficulty identifying who is responsible for addressing performance issues, due to their relationship being only with their retail service provider.

=== Voice over IP ===
VoIP services on FTTN and FTTB connections require a VDSL modem. Some RSPs allow customers to use their own VDSL modem, and publish the necessary settings to enable VoIP using third party modems. Some modems support both VDSL and ADSL. While older ADSL only modems cannot be used for VDSL (over an FTTN connection), they can be used for FTTP using the Ethernet WAN port if the hardware offers this functionality.

=== FTTN ===
FTTN is reliant on:

- the length of the copper cable. Where the length of copper exceeds 400 m for FTTN (or 150 m for FTTC) speeds drop off. An NBN spokesman said that homes up to 800 metres from a node may only get up to 50 Mbit/s instead of 100, and further than that users can only expect a quarter of the maximum speed, 25 Mbit/s.
- the quality of the copper connection. Where the copper is degraded service reliability and or speed are affected.

Installation issues:

- relating to existing telephony wiring compatibility with VDSL2.
- Craig Levy, Chief operating officer at TPG, stated, "... with NBN FTTN we are not allowed to lodge a fault unless the line performs less than 12 Mbit/s sync speed."

FTTN has had issues with VDSL2 modems being incompatible with NBN FTTN. Attempting to connect an incompatible modem automatically locks a user's service and they are required to contact their service provider to unlock it. NBN Co does not publish a list of compliant modems, rejecting a Freedom of Information request for such a list in 2016.

=== HFC ===
HFC, like FTTN, is a shared service and subject to network congestion.

=== Satellite ===
Sky Muster satellite connections have issues of regarding response times and limited data allowances.

Ongoing extended satellite outages, with ongoing work to improve service.

=== Fixed wireless ===
Fixed wireless connections to the NBN have severe issues regarding bandwidth due to massive oversubscription (NBN design documents are supposed to limit each "sector" to 56-110 premises however this is routinely exceeded) as well as issues with latency and limited data allowances.

=== Connection speeds ===
The lack of accurate information on broadband speeds is a significant issue for end users according to the Australian Competition & Consumer Commission (ACCC). ACCC initiated a broadband performance monitoring program in May 2017.

== Retail service providers ==
NBN Co wholesales Layer 2 network access to retail service providers (RSPs), who retail Internet access and other services. In this respect they strongly represent Internet Service Providers (ISPs).

Pricing to RSPs is uniform within each technology regardless of where the service is delivered and across the technologies for the basic package. To provide this uniform pricing, regional and rural areas are cross-subsidised with the lower cost metropolitan areas. However, as RSP costs may vary, retail prices may vary between RSPs.

At February 2017, over 50 Retail Service Providers offered services, with three (Telstra, Optus and TPG) sharing 83% of the market. Fibre and fixed wireless plans start from $29.90 per month for the lowest tier of 12/1 megabit per second download/upload speeds and the highest speed tier of 1000/400 for $330 per month.

=== Connectivity ===
To prevent other potential providers from undercutting NBN Co in metropolitan areas, new fibre networks are required to be open access and charge similar prices; these rules are known as the "anti-cherry picking" provisions, which were enacted with other NBN legislation.

== Political and industry responses ==
=== Political responses ===
When the Rudd Labor opposition first broached its NBN proposal, it was dismissed by the Howard government as unnecessary. It was argued that an upgrade to the current copper networks where "commercial solutions were not always viable" would address the need. In 2009, the Coalition described the NBN as a "dangerous delusion".

National Party Senator Barnaby Joyce said the NBN mirrored a proposal released by their think tank, saying it "delivers a strategic infrastructure outcome" and it is "vitally important that the [NBN] gets to the corners of our country where the market has failed".

Independent MPs Rob Oakeshott, Tony Windsor, Bob Katter and Andrew Wilkie expressed support for NBN. Katter said the NBN is "a great thing for this country". Windsor said the NBN is "too good an opportunity to miss". Family First Party leader Steve Fielding said the NBN will "bring [Australia] up to speed".

The size of the government's investment was a key point of debate. The Coalition called for a cost-benefit analysis, describing the NBN as "a white elephant on a massive scale" and instead advocated for a plan more focused on addressing underserved areas. The Economist Intelligence Unit (EIU) criticised the NBN's "huge cost to the public sector" when analysing various countries broadband plans.

The Greens said the NBN "is a key piece of 21st century infrastructure".

=== Telecommunications stakeholders ===
Telecommunication companies Optus, iiNet, Internode and Vodafone expressed support for the project, along with the Australian Internet Industry Association, which said optical fibre solutions are "a critical part in the evolution of the internet". Internode managing director Simon Hackett said he was "glad [the NBN is] going to go ahead". Vodafone-Hutchison CEO Nigel Dews said the NBN will "transform the competitive landscape". However, other telecommunications companies including AAPT, PIPE Networks and Exetel have expressed opposition to the NBN. AAPT chief executive Paul A. Broad said the NBN will "stifle competition". PIPE Networks founder Bevan Slattery said the NBN is "economically irresponsible". Exetel chief executive John Linton described the NBN as a "political stunt".

Microsoft, Google and Intel expressed support. Google's head of engineering, Alan Noble, said the NBN will "be the greatest enabler of innovation". Intel managing director Philip Cronin said "the NBN has the potential to deliver significant long term benefits". The Swinburne University of Technology conducted a survey of Australian Internet usage for the World Internet Project between September 2009 and October 2009. The survey of 1,000 people asked about Internet usage and how it influences daily life. A question was included asking if the NBN was a "good idea"; 74.5 per cent agreed. In the survey, the NBN had stronger support among younger people and Internet users.

=== Australian Competition and Consumer Commission (ACCC) ===
Given the market failure found in attempting to develop and implement the replacement telecommunications network a natural monopoly was set up with ACCC safeguarding the interests of end users, access seekers and NBN Co. This is achieved through NBN Co entering into a Special Access Undertaking to govern aspects of NBN design, service and charging until 2040, agreed 2013.

== Coverage ==
Some NBN areas are "brownfield" that were provided directly by NBN Co, but many were new "greenfield" areas in subdivisions that did not have an existing service. Greenfield developments must provide fibre connections, at a cost to the developer (and thus homeowner). Most brownfield areas are near existing exchanges, which presumably already had ADSL.

The NBN Corporate Plan 2011–2013 estimated approximately 13 million premises would be covered by the NBN, 12 million using fibre (FTTP). However this plan was abandoned by the incoming Liberal government in 2013.

=== Blackspots ===
In February 2014 the government produced a new MyBroadband website that provided information about access. It showed that 1.6 million premises across Australia either have no access to fixed broadband or very poor broadband connectivity.

== Customer uptake ==
Premises are considered "passed" when "all design, construction, commissioning and quality assurance activities in a FSAM (Fibre Servicing Area Module) have been completed for the Local network and Distribution network". Certain premises classed as "service class zero" that require extra internal construction such as apartments, town houses, shopping arcades and industrial complexes may not be able to order services, even though their premises had been passed.

NBN Co's stated their usage of "premises passed" was an "accepted industry definition". However, their corporate plan defined "premises passed" as places where "NBN services may be ordered and purchased", causing NBN Co to be accused of "creative accounting".

No aggregate data summarises broadband speeds possible for connectable premises, which has been identified as a significant issue for end users by ACCC.

=== Total number of active NBN connections by access technology ===
View chart definition.

=== Speed tier percentage per NBN connection type ===
Shows the speed tier as a percentage of total active connections of each NBN connection type (fixed line, satellite and wireless). A customer can choose any speed tier that is available for their service; the speed tier is the maximum download/upload limit of the service.

View source data.

=== Half-yearly data ===
The tabulated data of half-yearly statistics for active NBN connections. An active NBN connection is where construction has been completed and a customer has ordered and activated an NBN service.

Total number of active NBN connections by access technology (rounded to nearest '00)
Type	2011		2012		2013		2014		2015		2016		2017		2018
Type	Jun	Dec	Jun	Dec	Jun	Dec	Jun	Dec	Jun	Dec	Jun	Dec	Jun	Dec	Jun
Fixed wireless	—N/a	—N/a	91	1 000	1 900	6 500	16 600	27 800	47 500	82 400	117 500	154 000	184 700	212 900	~200 000
FttN	—N/a	—N/a	—N/a	—N/a	—N/a	—N/a	—N/a	—N/a	—N/a	6 600	119 700	449 300	958 000	1 529 900	~2 100 000
FttP	600	2 300	3 900	10 400	33 600	80 100	151 100	253 800	399 900	611 000	822 700	969 700	1 072 800	1 151 900	~1 200 000
HFC	—N/a	—N/a	—N/a	—N/a	—N/a	—N/a	—N/a	—N/a	—N/a	—N/a	10	14 600	152 800	408 300	~400 000
Satellite	200	1 700	9 600	23 100	34 600	44 200	43 000	40 700	38 300	36 000	38 800	64 900	74 900	83 400	~100 000
Total	800	4 000	13 600	34 500	70 100	130 800	210 700	322 300	485 700	736 000	1 098 700	1 652 500	2 443 100	3 386 000	~4 400 000

Speed tier percentage per NBN connection type: (Down/Up, Mbit/s)
Type	Speed	2011		2012		2013		2014		2015		2016		2017		2018
Type	Speed	Jun	Dec	Jun	Dec	Jun	Dec	Jun	Dec	Jun	Dec	Jun	Dec	Jun	Dec	Jun
Fixed line: (FttN, FttP, HFC)	12/1						~43%		38%	35%	33%	32%	31%	29%	30%	29%
Fixed line: (FttN, FttP, HFC)	25/5						~30%		38%	42%	45%	49%	51%	53%	52%	22%
Fixed line: (FttN, FttP, HFC)	25/10						~1%		1%	1%	1%	1%	1%	1%	1%	1%
Fixed line: (FttN, FttP, HFC)	50/20						~4%		4%	4%	5%	4%	4%	4%	4%	37%
Fixed line: (FttN, FttP, HFC)	100/40						~22%		19%	18%	16%	14%	13%	13%	13%	11%
Satellite (Sky Muster):	12/1	—N/a	—N/a	—N/a	—N/a	—N/a	—N/a	—N/a	—N/a	—N/a	—N/a	26%	33%	34%	34%	32%
Satellite (Sky Muster):	25/5	—N/a	—N/a	—N/a	—N/a	—N/a	—N/a	—N/a	—N/a	—N/a	—N/a	74%	67%	66%	66%	68%
Wireless:	12/1						~65%		26%	20%	17%	16%	17%	16%	17%	7%
Wireless:	25/5						~35%		74%	80%	83%	81%	79%	78%	76%	74%
Wireless:	50/20	—N/a	—N/a	—N/a	—N/a	—N/a	—N/a	—N/a	—N/a	—N/a	—N/a	3%	4%	6%	7%	9%

== See also ==
- Internet in Australia
- National Broadband Plan in the United States
- Telecommunications in Australia
- Ultra-Fast Broadband programme in New Zealand
