= Ninefold =

Ninefold Pty Ltd (dba Ninefold)
- Company type: Private company
- Industry: Internet Hosting Service
- Founded: 2011
- Headquarters: Level 20, 2 Market St; Sydney, NSW 2000
- Key people: Peter James, Chairman
- Website: http://ninefold.com

Ninefold was a cloud computing company which provided infrastructure as a service (IaaS). Ninefold was headquartered in Sydney, Australia and was backed by Macquarie Telecom (ASX: MAQ), an ASX-listed Australian B2B telecommunications company.

== History and growth ==
=== Launch ===
Ninefold was founded by Macquarie Telecom in 2011 to meet a growing demand for cloud computing in Australia. The company provided virtual servers from 2011 until it stopped trading a few years later.

== Services ==
Ninefold offered self-managed virtual servers.

=== Virtual Servers ===
Ninefold's customers were able to provision virtual servers via an online portal.

=== Australian Federal Government Hosting ===
On 26 June 2013, Ninefold became a member of the Data Centre as a Service (DCaaS) Multi-User List, which is published by the Australian Government Department of Finance. On 13 February 2015, Ninefold was listed as a product available to Federal Government agencies through Macquarie Telecom.

=== Docker Support ===
On 10 June 2014, Ninefold commenced support of Docker with the announcement that Docker 1.0.0 was available.

== Competitors ==
- AppScale
- Heroku
- Engine Yard
- OpenShift
- Amazon Web Services
- DigitalOcean
