= Agile Communications =

Australian telecommunications company

Agile Pty Ltd
- Trade name: Agile Communications
- Type: Subsidiary
- Industry: Telecommunications
- Founded: Adelaide, South Australia (1998)
- Headquarters: Adelaide, South Australia
- Key people: Simon Hackett, Founder Catherine Conway, Co-founder
- Products: Broadband, Voice
- Parent: Internode ISP
- Website: www.agile.com.au

Agile Communications is a licensed national telecommunications carrier based in South Australia and was the first South Australian based company to gain this license. The company is the wholesale subsidiary of internet service provider Internode ISP.

The company was founded by Internode Managing Director Simon Hackett and Catherine Conway and is based in Adelaide. Internode and Agile were bought out by iiNet in 2012 and iiNet itself was acquired by TPG Telecom in 2015.

== History ==
In May 2001, Agile built the Coorong Network, a microwave network interlinking Adelaide, Murray Bridge, Tailem Bend, Binnies Hill, Tintinara and Meningie using Cisco based hardware.

In October 2003, Agile installed its own equipment in the Telstra exchange at Meningie, South Australia to provide ADSL to a town where Telstra was yet to provide broadband ADSL. This made it the first exchange in Australia where ADSL was available, but not through Telstra.

In late 2003, Agile began a rollout of a national network, an Optic Fibre based IP network running on STM-1 Packet over Sonet (POS) links to connect all Agile POPs across Australia.

== Coverage ==
The national network currently extends to Adelaide, Melbourne, Brisbane, Sydney, Perth, Canberra and Hobart. In 2005, Agile extended their national network to the United States with points of presence in Los Angeles and San Jose.

From 2007 Agile designed and rolled out a broadband service using licensed fixed WiMax radio technology across the Coorong and Yorke Peninsula regions of South Australia. The service was retailed to customers by Internode and regional Internode resellers.

At the time of its sale, Agile had built 45 rural microwave installations in country SA with the Riverland and Murraylands also added to the network. The Agile International network has become the core of the international network of iiNet and Internode following the acquisition of the Internode company group by iiNet.
