= Internode (ISP) =

Australian internet service provider

Internode Pty Ltd
- Type: Subsidiary
- Industry: Telecommunications
- Founded: 1991
- Founder: Simon Hackett; Robyn Taylor
- Headquarters: Adelaide, Australia
- Services: Broadband, Colocation, DNS, Webhosting, VoIP, VPN, VPDN, IBC
- Parent: TPG Telecom
- Website: internode.on.net

Internode Pty Ltd was an Australian Internet service provider (ISP) that provided NBN broadband services, business-class broadband access, web hosting, co-location, Voice over IP, and a variety of related services. It was based in Adelaide, South Australia. Internode became part of TPG Telecom in July 2020. TPG initiated a closure of Internode business operations in December 2023, and began transitioning existing Internode customers to other TPG-owned brands (iiNet and Vodafone).

== History ==
The company was founded in 1991 by Robyn Taylor and Managing Director Simon Hackett,

Internode was the first ISP to offer ADSL2/2+ services in Australia, by installing their own DSLAMs in Telstra exchanges. This allowed them to offer access speeds of up to 24 Mbit/s, significantly higher than the fastest speed then offered by Telstra at the time (1.5 Mbit/s). (See also Broadband Internet Access, Australia) Internode also provided a Naked ADSL2+ service, operating on both Agile and Optus hardware. Internode was a part of the Terria consortium which bid to build the National Broadband Network.

=== Acquisition by iiNet ===
On 22 December 2011, Western Australian based internet service provider iiNet announced the acquisition of Internode in a deal worth $105 million.

In May 2012, it was announced that Simon Hackett's role would change from being the managing director of Internode to become a non-executive board member for iiNet. At the same time several members of Internode's management team were transferred to management positions within iiNet.

In November 2013, it was announced that Simon Hackett would be leaving Internode and the iiNet Group to join the board of the NBN Co which has been tasked by the Australian Government to provide the next generation of broadband to Australia.

In September 2015, iiNet was acquired by TPG Telecom in a $1.65 billion deal.

In December 2023, Internode announced that it would cease accepting new customers to the Internode brand, and that all existing residential Internode customers will be migrated to the iiNet brand.

=== Milestones ===
- Telecommunications backbone in regional Australia: 2001 marked the launch of the Coorong Communications Network, one of the first non-incumbent telecommunications backbones built into a regional area in Australia, offering low cost voice and data services to regional customers. In 2005 a second regional network based on the same technology was deployed in the Yorke Peninsula region, demonstrating that the underlying model is not only sustainable, but reproducible. (see Press Release)
- Games network: 1 July 2002 saw the launch of the Internode Games Network, a private gaming network run by Internode for its ADSL customers. It became the largest gaming network in Australia (in terms of peak daily player count) ahead of even Telstra's GameArena. It has since been discontinued.
- Agile Broadband rollout: In mid-2003, Internode's infrastructure company, Agile, installed its own equipment in the Telstra exchange at Meningie, South Australia. This made it the first exchange in Regional Australia where ADSL was available from a non-Telstra DSLAM. DSLAM deployment continued, ultimately becoming national in extent.
- International Backbone: In early 2005, Agile extended the national private backbone it operates for Internode to connect to the United States. This link was initially provided by leased capacity on the Southern Cross Cable system, expanded in December 2006 to also utilise capacity leased on Australia-Japan Cable to provide an alternative pathway to that provided by Southern Cross Cable.
- Unmetered content: Internode also runs content servers such as a cluster of Steam content servers. Further 'unmetered' content available via the national Agile backbone network includes relays of popular streaming audio sources and a 10 terabyte mirror server. includes a file mirror and radio streams
- Gaming Network: Internode offers free services to members, recently giving a free advance screening of the blockbuster V for Vendetta in Brisbane, and Lucky Number Slevin in Melbourne. These screenings will be discontinued in favour of supporting events, such as the Canberra Games Festival.
- SourceForge Mirror: On 3 June 2008, Internode announced the availability of the first full Australian SourceForge mirror.
- IPv6: On 18 July 2008, Internode launched a national IPv6 service, the first in Australia.
- Email Services: On 30 November 2023 Internode will stop providing an email service. Internode email addresses are moving to The Messaging Company in 2023 and will be at a yet to be determined cost to the end user.

Internode has supported many local events, such as the Adelaide Film Festival, WOMADelaide, the Adelaide Fringe (for at least 10 years until 2014) and the Global Green hosting Challenge.

It also provides services for video game company Valve.

== Products ==
=== VoIP ===
Internode operates a nationally available VoIP based service called NodePhone which leverages the international Agile backbone network and widespread deployment of Cisco VoIP gateways on that backbone to offer low cost, distance independent telephony services. This telephony service runs over a national private IP network, not over the "best-effort" Internet like many VoIP competitors. As such, it is positioned as a carrier grade, packet based voice service, and is not susceptible to quality problems created by external Internet path failures or congestion. While the original NodePhone did not allow incoming PSTN calls, NodePhone2, released on 23 April 2007, is a full two-way VoIP service.

=== Wireless hotspots ===
Internode provides a contiguous wireless hotspot network, formerly known as CityLAN, in Adelaide, South Australia. The network is an initiative brought about to provide Internet access throughout Adelaide, and eventually nationally. This high-speed Wi-Fi network is open to the public with coverage at hotspots throughout the Adelaide CBD.

The CityLAN network is an existing wireless network in the Adelaide city provided by Internode. It provides wireless access to guests and existing Internode customers and has strong access around North Terrace, Rundle Street, Rundle Mall, Grenfell Street, Hutt Street, and areas of North Adelaide. Access through the Internode Wireless Hotspot network is also provided throughout both the Adelaide Airport and Darwin International Airport terminals. Guests may only use a limited number of services, while Internode customers that log into the service get all ports opened, allowing, for instance, the use of email clients like Thunderbird or Outlook.

== See also ==
- List of VOIP companies
