= Pegasus Networks =

First public Internet service provider in Australia

- Industry: Internet provider
- Founded: September 14, 1989; 37 years ago in Australia
- Founder: Ian Peter
- Headquarters: Australia

Pegasus Networks was the first public Internet service provider in Australia, commencing in June 1989 with local access, and moving to nationwide access from 14 September 1989. It acted as a "gateway" to emerging online networks working in the fields of environment, labor, peace, women's and the human rights movement. It offered Australia-wide access via X25 networks and initially used UUCP and TCP/IP connections to the United States to exchange mail and newsgroup content, initially via direct dialup to the United States, and later via ACSNet.

Pegasus' foundation CEO was Ian Peter. Pegasus Networks offered public dialup access to the Internet in Australia. The launch video features early use of mobile phones for internet access and solar powered computer facilities. Pegasus operated initially from Byron Bay, New South Wales, and later from Brisbane, Queensland.

Pegasus Networks was active in establishing connectivity to countries in South East Asia and Indo-China with partners such as Pactok, Sarawak Access and the Email Center in the Philippines.

Australian projects included the national sub-networks CouncilNet, ArtsNet and International Education and Resource Network (iEARN). The Australian branch of Association for Progressive Communications (APC, trading as 'Community Communications Online' or 'c2o'), was founded in 1997, and aimed "to continue support for progressive networking activities in the Australasia region after the closure of Pegasus Networks." Pegasus was a founding member of APC in 1990.
