= Western Australian Internet Exchange =

Neutral Internet Exchange Point in Perth, Western Australia

- Full name: Western Australian Internet Exchange
- Abbreviation: WAIX
- Founded: 1997
- Location: Perth, Western Australia
- Website: https://internet.asn.au/

The Western Australian Internet Exchange (WAIX) was formed in 1997 as a neutral Internet exchange point in Perth, Western Australia. Its three founding members were iiNet, Omen Internet and Wantree Internet. Today WAIX has some 100 peers and facilitates peak transfer rates of over 200 gigabits per second.

The exchange is operated by the Internet Association of Australia, a not-for-profit, member driven, licensed telecommunications carrier. WAIX is the longest running exchange point in Australia. The Association operates Internet exchange points across Australia.

It was originally located only in the QV1 building in central Perth, and is now in numerous locations across Perth. Most Western Australian Internet service provider (ISPs) also peer at the facility.

== Brief history ==
The peering fabric first existed informally as links between "Wantree Internet" and "Omen Internet" to iiNet. WAIX was formalised as an initiative by the Western Australian Internet Association (which became the Internet Association of Australia) after a presentation by Andrew Khoo on his similar work in Sydney and Melbourne to create multi-lateral peering fabrics in both cities. The ISPs at the presentation later agreed they could form the fabric themselves and did so by leasing a small room in QV1 and began as a formal peering exchange after Omen, iiNet and Wantree moved their interconnects into the peering room.

Various attempts were made over the first few years to arrange traffic exchange between peers at WAIX and peers at other Australian internet exchanges (notably the South Australia Internet Exchange) allowing peers to pay for interstate traffic. This was an arrangement with one of the peers at the time who peered at more than one Australian peering fabric. Similar arrangements were formalised in the eastern states with the formation of AusBone.
