= Powertel =

Mobile network operator

Powertel Inc.
- Type: Public
- Traded as: NASDAQ: PTEL
- Industry: Wireless Telecommunications
- Predecessor: Powertel PCS Partners L.P.
- Founded: May 1989 as Interstate Cellular, Inc.
- Defunct: May 31, 2001
- Fate: Acquired by Deutsche Telekom AG
- Successor: VoiceStream Wireless Inc.
- Headquarters: West Point, Georgia, U.S.
- Area served: Mississippi, Georgia, Alabama, Tennessee, Kentucky, Florida Panhandle and neighboring areas
- Products: Ericsson T28 World phone Motorola T2282 Talkabout
- Services: Personal Power Plans; The 50-State Rates; Powertel Data
- Revenue: $464.2 million (2000)
- Operating income: $6.5 million (2000)
- Number of employees: 2,600 (2000)
- Website: powertel.com at the Wayback Machine (archived 2000-06-20)

Powertel Inc. was a mobile network operator headquartered in West Point, Georgia, United States that provided analog cellular and digital PCS mobile communications services in the Southeastern United States. Powertel traces its roots to the May 1989 incorporation in Georgia of Interstate Cellular, Inc., a wholly owned subsidiary of ITC Holding Company, Inc. Interstate Cellular was formed to acquire cellular telephone licenses and construct and operate cellular telephone systems.

== History ==
InterCel, Inc. was incorporated in Delaware in April 1991 and became the owner of the assets of both Interstate Cellular, Inc. and WHI Partnership. In October 1991, InterCel, Inc. became a publicly traded company, offering stock on the NASDAQ under the ticker symbol ICEL.

InterCel acquired Unicell, a provider of cellular communications service in Maine, in January 1993. The combined company had 20,000 subscribers in a market area that covers a population of 780,000 people.

In February 1994, InterCel and other investors formed Powertel PCS Partners L.P. to develop, construct and operate a GSM mobile cellular network that would provide services in nine Southeastern states. In March 1995, Powertel PCS Partners submitted winning bids for wireless spectrum covering parts of nine Southeastern states. InterCel acquired all outstanding interests in Powertel PCS Partners, making Powertel PCS a wholly owned subsidiary, and Powertel began to build a digital GSM network to operate on the recently acquired spectrum.

In December 1996, InterCel agreed to sell Unicel to Rural Cellular Corporation.

In June 1997, InterCel, Inc. changed its name to Powertel, Inc. and changed its NASDAQ stock ticker symbol to PTEL.

On May 3, 1999, InterCel sold its analog cellular operations to Public Service Cellular, Inc. for US$89 million.

Powertel, Inc. was acquired by Deutsche Telekom AG on May 31, 2001, and was made a subsidiary of VoiceStream Wireless, Inc., which was acquired by Deutsche Telekom on the same day.
