= AAPT (company) =

Australian telecommunications company

- Type: Subsidiary
- Industry: Telecommunications
- Founded: 1991 in Australia
- Headquarters: Glebe, New South Wales, Australia
- Products: Wholesale broadband Wholesale data transmission
- Parent: TPG Telecom (2013–2025); Vocus Group (2025–present)

AAPT is a fixed-line telecommunications wholesaler owned by Vocus Group. It owns significant fibre and internet infrastructure in Australia. Its national network offers data, cloud, voice and internet services.

== History ==
AAPT was conceived over a working lunch in the late 1980s when Lee Casey and executives from the technical division scratched out on a table napkin the idea. The company was formed by the division of the communications businesses of Australian Associated Press. In 1992 AAPIS was formed with News Corporation and John Fairfax Holdings as majority shareholders, with MCI and Todd Capital also possessing shares in the company.

The company began operating as the first significant competitor to Telstra in the long-distance voice and data markets in 1991, offering point to point microwave shots to AAP's private exchanges in Sydney and Melbourne, offering STD and International Long Distance services using the AAP's leased backbone, (which at the time was one of the largest private backbone networks in Australia) and terminating calls through a hybrid of its own network and various international and domestic interconnection agreements.

In 1992 the company secured the 1414 access to the PSTN (Public Switched Telephone Network) enabling the company to pick up calls (using autodialers), transmit and pay domestic and international carriers to deliver calls off-net. Optus around the same time decided to focus on residential. AAPT (thanks to guidance from its MCI Team, and a great business billing system) made the decision to focus on the Business to Business market, their advertising agency Neo One came up with a unique "Turn Your Back on the Big Boys" strategy and in October 1992 AAPT released FirstChoice, offering Australian businesses double digit savings on their STD bill, and invoices with graphs showing usage, savings and comparatives to previous months. In the next four years AAPT sales and customer service team of over 300 motivated sales people engaged the business market and was able to build revenues past $300 million received from over 200,000 business clients.

The company received a full carrier licence on 1 July 1997, and began a very successful campaign to build a residential client base that peaked at over 600,000 users. The company was listed on the Australian Securities Exchange in November of the same year.

In January 1999 Todd Capital sold its entire stake in the company.

In 2000 the company was acquired by Telecom New Zealand in stages and delisted from the stock exchange. Along with owning and operating its own national voice and data network, AAPT operated as a Virtual Network Operator in the mobile market on the Vodafone Australia network. In 2005 CommodiTel acquired AAPT's prepaid mobile customer base, and shut down operations a few years later.

Under Telecom New Zealand ownership, AAPT required significant reinvestment from its parent company, failing to provide any returns and written down in value by NZ$1.7 billion. In 2006 Telecom considered selling the business but was unable to find a buyer. In 2010, however, AAPT sold its consumer business to iiNet for over $60 million, resulting in a massive cash injection to Telecom New Zealand, who had posted a profit decline in the same quarter.

With significant take-up of DSL services in Australia and the relatively slow DSL services available for resale from Telstra, AAPT sought access to competing DSL services operated by companies investing in local loop unbundling. In November 2006 AAPT signed a wholesale network agreement with Powertel to allow access to its wholesale network and installed ADSL2+ broadband network.

Powertel was subsequently absorbed by AAPT for A$357 million (NZ$400 million) in May 2007 and former Powertel boss, Paul Broad appointed CEO, with AAPT retiring the Powertel name.

In June 2011, David Yuile was appointed CEO of AAPT. David's previous role was chief operating officer at AAPT, where he successfully completed the integration of the AAPT-PowerTel businesses and was instrumental in the product and backoffice re-engineering and simplification. David resigned from AAPT in February 2014.

=== Sale to TPG ===
AAPT's consumer business was acquired by iiNet for $60 million from Telecom New Zealand in July 2010.

On 9 December 2013, Telecom New Zealand announced that it had sold the remaining corporate, wholesale and networks which comprised AAPT to TPG Telecom for $450 million.

In September 2015 iiNet was also acquired by TPG Telecom.

As of 2018, AAPT operated as TPG's wholesale arm, supplying broadband services and backhaul to small, medium, large and international ISPs.

=== Sale to Vocus Group ===
In October 2024, Vocus Group announced their intention to acquire TPG's Enterprise, Government and Wholesale (EG&W) fixed business and fibre network assets for $5.25 billion, this included AAPT Wholesale and Wholesale Services. The acquisition was completed at the end of July 2025.

== See also ==
- Internet in Australia
