= Macquarie Technology Group =

Australian telecommunications company

- Company type: Public (ASX: MAQ)
- Industry: Telecom, data centers, cloud computing, colocation, cyber security
- Founded: Sydney, Australia, 1992
- Headquarters: Sydney, Australia
- Key people: David Tudehope, CEO; Aidan Tudehope, Managing Director, Macquarie Government; Peter James, Chairman; Helen Cox, Chief Financial Officer
- Products: SD-LAN; SD-WAN; NBN for Business; Business Ethernet Access; Cisco Meraki; Fixed Wireless Ethernet; International Data Links; Internet; Private IP VPN; Saas Enabled WAN; Secure Remote Access; SIP Trunking; Fixed-line business phones Business mobiles Unified Communications; Video Conferencing; Web Conferencing; Managed Mobility Services; Mobile Management Tools; Secure Cloud; Secure Internet Gateway; Cybersecurity Services; State Government Cloud; Colocation; Cloud Services; Hybrid Cloud; VMware Cloud; Azure Managed; Virtual Data Centre; Private Cloud; Dedicated Servers; Dedicated Hosting; Object Storage; PCI Compliant Cloud
- Revenue: A$285.1 million (FY 2021)
- Net income: ▲ A$12.5 million (FY 2021)
- Number of employees: over 400
- Website: macquarietechnologygroup.com

Macquarie Technology Group Limited (ASX: MAQ) (Previously Macquarie Telecom Group) is an Australian cloud, data centre, government cyber security and telecom company, with offices in Sydney, Melbourne, Canberra, Brisbane and Perth. It owns and operates five data centers in Sydney and Canberra.

Macquarie Telecom Group was founded in July 1992 shortly after telecommunications deregulation in Australia. The company was listed on the Australian Securities Exchange (ASX) in 1999.

In June 2023 the company changed its name to Macquarie Technology Group, to reflect its broader focus across digital infrastructure, cloud, cybersecurity, data centres, and telecom services.

== Macquarie Technology Group - Business Units ==
On 28 July 2016, Macquarie Technology Group was announced with three distinct businesses – Macquarie Telecom, Macquarie Cloud Services and Macquarie Government. In 2018, it announced a fourth business unit, Macquarie Data Centres.

- Macquarie Telecom is a full service business provider of data, voice, mobile and colocation services.
- Macquarie Cloud Services provide cloud hosting services, including Azure Managed Services, hybrid cloud, VMware cloud, virtual data centres, private cloud, dedicated servers, dedicated hosting, object storage and PCI compliant cloud
- Macquarie Government provides services to Federal and State Government agencies, including secure cloud, secure internet gateway, colocation and cybersecurity services
- Macquarie Data Centres manages five data centres and an expansion plan to build Intellicentre 3 Super West was announced in 2021.

== Data Centre and Hosting ==
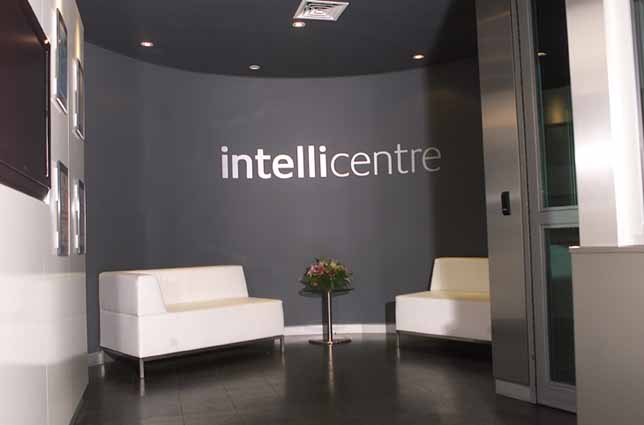
Data centre reception.

Macquarie Technology Group runs five data centers as part of its business selling managed services and managed hosting. The data centres are located in Sydney and Canberra and are branded by Macquarie Data Centres as "Intellicentre". Its second Sydney Data Center, Intellicentre 2, was opened September 2012, and it has Intellicentre 4 and 5 in Canberra.

In mid-2024, Macquarie Technology Group began building the IC3 Super West facility, designed to support AI and government workloads, and in July 2025, they acquired a new site for development of a hyperscale, AI/cloud-focused data centre.

Macquarie Technology Group's full portfolio of data centres has achieved The Australian Federal Government's Certified Strategic designation under the Digital Transformation Agency's (DTA) Hosting Certification Framework.

== Announcements ==
- In October 2011, Macquarie Telecom shared plans to build a second Sydney data centre 'Intelligence 2' which went on to house child company Ninefold
- In August 2015, Macquarie Telecom announced a $4.3m loss partly attributed to child company Ninefold
- In August 2017, Macquarie Telecom started a SD-WAN service, partnering with VMware. According to the company, it is Australia's first SD-WAN service that is capable of supporting multiple carriers.
- In June 2018, Macquarie Technology Group signed deal with NBN Co worth more than A$100 million. As part of the deal, Macquarie Telecom will start "Business-class NBN by Macquarie Telecom" which consists of a full suite of voice, internet, data and SD-WAN products that will be available to businesses across the country for new and existing customers
- In August 2019, Macquarie Technology Group announced signing of a deal with Apple Inc through which Macquarie Technology Group will resell Apple devices along with "bespoke” and off-the-shelf iOS apps for mid-market businesses.
- In November 2019, The Australian Tax Office signs Macquarie Technology Group for Secure Internet Gateway
- In October 2020, Macquarie Technology Group was awarded World's Best Customer Experience at the World Communications Awards, Chief Executive David Tudehope was also awarded CEO of the Year
- In November 2020, at the annual GloTel (Global Telecoms) awards, Macquarie Cloud Services won Managed Services Innovation of the Year for Azure Managed
- In February 2021, Macquarie Telecom debuted it's SD-LAN service
- In July 2021, Macquarie Technology Group announced plans to build a new data centre called Intellicentre 3 Super West at its Macquarie Park Data Centre Campus
- In June 2023, Macquarie Technology Group announced their plans to re-brand from Macquarie Telecom Group to Macquarie Technology Group, to better encompass the groups focus and future in the technology space.
- In October 2023, co-founders David and Aidan Tudehope were awarded the Pearcey Medal, the Australian ICT industry's highest award.

== Clients ==
Some clients and partners of Macquarie Technology Group include: Dell, Cisco, VMware, Fortinet, Red Hat, Zerto, Virtustream, Google, Accenture, Marketo, News Corp, Westpac, BMC, Symantec, Vision Australia, Hall and Prior, Parliament of Australia, Federal Court of Australia, Western Sydney Airport, Department of the Prime Minister and Cabinet, Victoria State Government, Tourism Australia, Civil Aviation Safety Authority, Australian Prudential Regulation Authority,
