= Online piracy =

Illegal use of digital copyrighted works

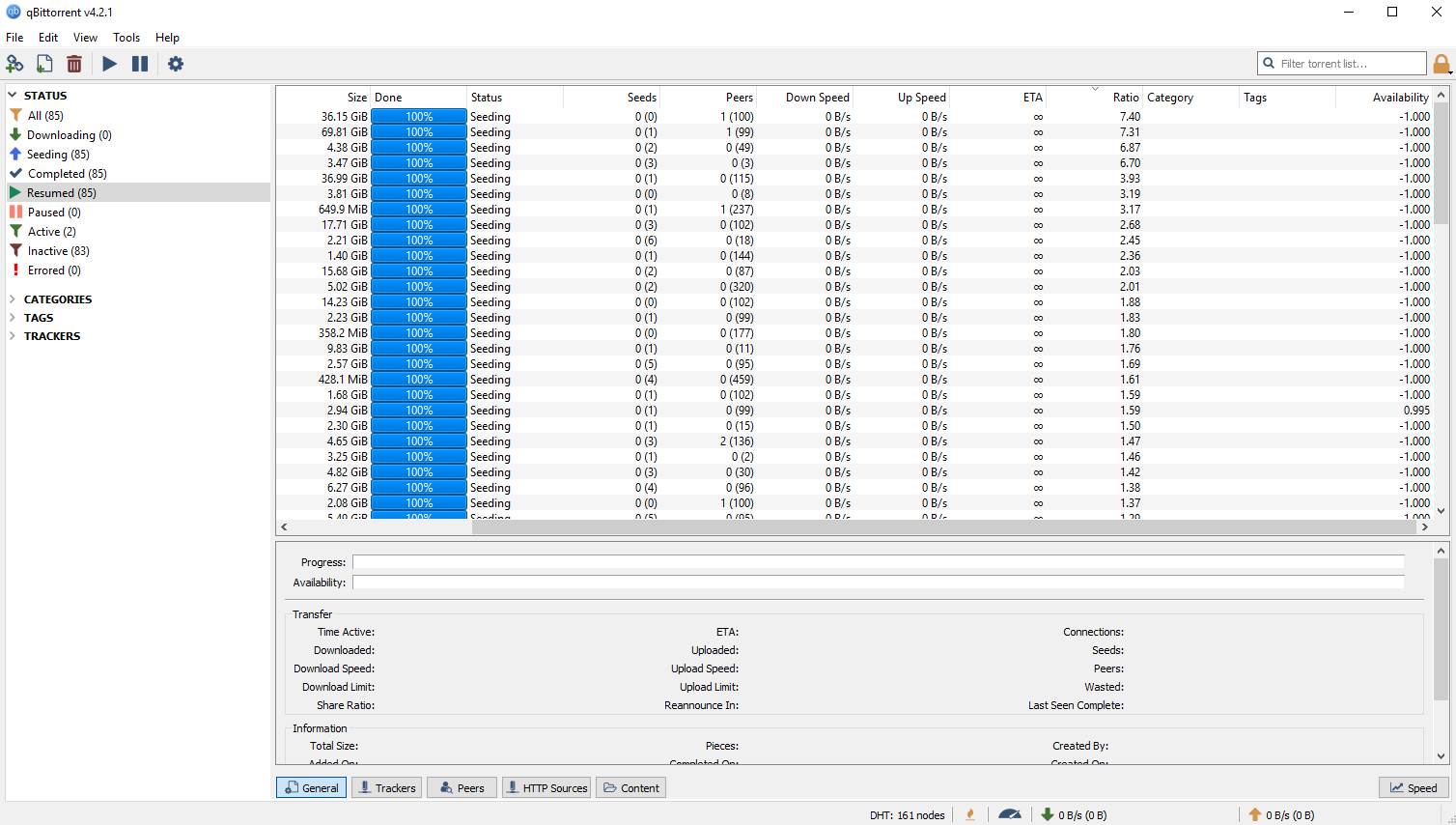
qBittorrent is one of the most widely used torrenting programs due to its free and open-source nature.

Online piracy (also known as digital piracy, internet piracy, software piracy or piracy) is the practice of illegally downloading or redistributing copyrighted digital works, such as music, movies or software.

== History ==
Before the days of online piracy, software and music piracy occurred by copying the contents of one disk to another. Starting in 1978, the creation of the first BBS and the availability of dial-up modems led to the creation of the first warez distribution groups which operated on BBSes. When the Internet Relay Chat was created in 1988, it became the main spreading point for multiple forms of pirated content.

The release of Napster in 1999 caused a rapid upsurge in online piracy of music, films, and television. The distribution of music through the MP3 format led to a lawsuit with the Recording Industry Association of America (RIAA). It allowed users to share content via peer-to-peer (P2P) file sharing and was one of the first mainstream uses of this distribution method. Napster was ordered by a federal judge to shut down on July 27, 2000, and officially ceased operations on July 11, 2001, following the court's order. The case was officially settled on September 24, 2001.

Following the shutdown of Napster, many other peer-to-peer (P2P) file sharing programs arose, the creation and usage of Limewire quickly following suit. In contrast to the self-contained servers of Napster, Limewire decentralized their servers by implementing the Gnutella network. The success of the BitTorrent communication protocol led to the rise of many other programs that are currently being used for peer-to-peer (P2P) file sharing such as μTorrent, Transmission, and qBittorrent.

== Scope ==
A 2019 study sponsored by the U.S. Chamber of Commerce Global Innovation Policy Center (GIPC) in partnership with the National Economic Research Associates "estimates that global online piracy costs the U.S. economy at least $29.2 billion in lost revenue each year." An August 2021 report by the Digital Citizens Alliance (DCA) states that "online criminals who offer stolen movies, TV shows, games, and live events through websites and apps are reaping $1.34 billion in annual advertising revenues." The DCA claims that they consist of "risky advertising that exposes consumers to fraud and malware."

Top websites and apps that offer stolen contents generate up to millions of dollars in advertisement revenue alone. Additional revenue outside of advertisement revenue usually comes from subscriptions and the sale of content. Piracy behavior demonstrated that economic theory explains a notable part of the individual variation in a survey study. Individuals with a low net valuation of an original when a copy is available are more prone to engage in piracy than individuals with a higher valuation. Individuals with a low cost of obtaining and handling copies are also more engaged in piracy. The country-wise variation can also be explained by economic variables; GNI per capita and judicial efficiency explain a substantial part of this variation.

While such piracy and stolen content distribution sites are occasionally shut down, they are often quickly replaced, and may move through successive national legal jurisdictions to avoid law enforcement. These efforts at detection and enforcement are further complicated by the often prohibitive amount of time, resources and number of personnel required. Some jurisdictions, such as Thailand and Malaysia, have no legislation in place to address online piracy, and others, such as the Philippines and Vietnam, have oversight regimes in place that have proven largely ineffective.

== Implications ==
Online piracy has led to improvements into file sharing technology that has bettered information distribution as a whole. Additionally, pirating communities tend to model market trends well, as members of those communities tend to be early adopters. Piracy can also lead to businesses developing new models that better account for the current market. It has been argued that online piracy may help in preventing businesses from investing in unnecessary marketing campaigns. In addition to helping screen businesses, research proposes that some organizations may be better off servicing only their most valued and legitimate customers, or those who buy legitimate copies of their products. Because pirated copies of software are expected to attract customers who are sensitive to price, it may not be to businesses' best interest to engage in extraneous price wars with their competitors or invest heavily in anti-piracy campaigns to win target customers.

Despite the discourse on the digital threat of piracy, it has been shown that innovation and the creation of new works is flourishing more than ever on the Internet. Piracy has also benefited users in countries where content is either unavailable or delayed. In the case of ABC's Lost, the fear of its last episode being pirated in European and Middle Eastern countries pushed the network to accelerate the episode's distribution to those countries, resulting in the episode being available in those countries 24–48 hours after the original American broadcast.

Bill Gates said, in 2007, that piracy in China of Microsoft products helped his company compete against Linux.

== Ethics ==
Proponents of online piracy argue that, unlike theft, the original copyright holder still possesses the work that was pirated.

Researches that study piracy concludes that piracy can be studied as an ethical and moral decision-making issue, rather than simply as a legal or technological issue. A person's ethical and moral predispositions and the judgments that they use to make moral decisions has been found to be consistent across various ethical dilemmas and their likelihood to pirate content. Furthermore, findings published in the International Journal of Electronic Commerce Studies suggests that personal moral beliefs primarily influence individuals during the initial phase of piracy, whereas neutralization techniques are subsequently used to justify and maintain such behavior.

A 2018 survey indicated that the prevalence of piracy is due to the industry's inability to cater to the consumer. Many individuals who pirate content cite unsatisfactory industry practices such as obtrusive DRM in paid software, overpriced media, and split markets as their reason for pirating. Digital piracy has posed a significant threat to the development of the software industry and the growth of the digital media industry, it has, for the last decade, held considerable interest for researchers and practitioners. Although many individuals do not perceive piracy to be an ethical problem, consumers who pirate have been shown to be more willing to pay for legal content when the content is consumer-friendly.

As more content is fractured into different services, consumers gravitate more towards piracy due to the inconvenience and prohibitive cost of managing multiple service subscriptions to different entities that provide their own content service such as Netflix, Amazon Prime Video, Disney+, HBO Max, and Apple TV A surge of piracy in this practice occurred in 2023, when nearly 229 billion visits to piracy-related websites were recorded. Quartz have partly attributed certain platforms' subscriber losses, namely Disney+ and Hulu, to increased piracy.

== See also ==
- Copyright infringement
- Pirated movie release types
- Privacy in file sharing networks
- Trade group efforts against file sharing
