= Music piracy =

Unauthorized copying and distribution of music

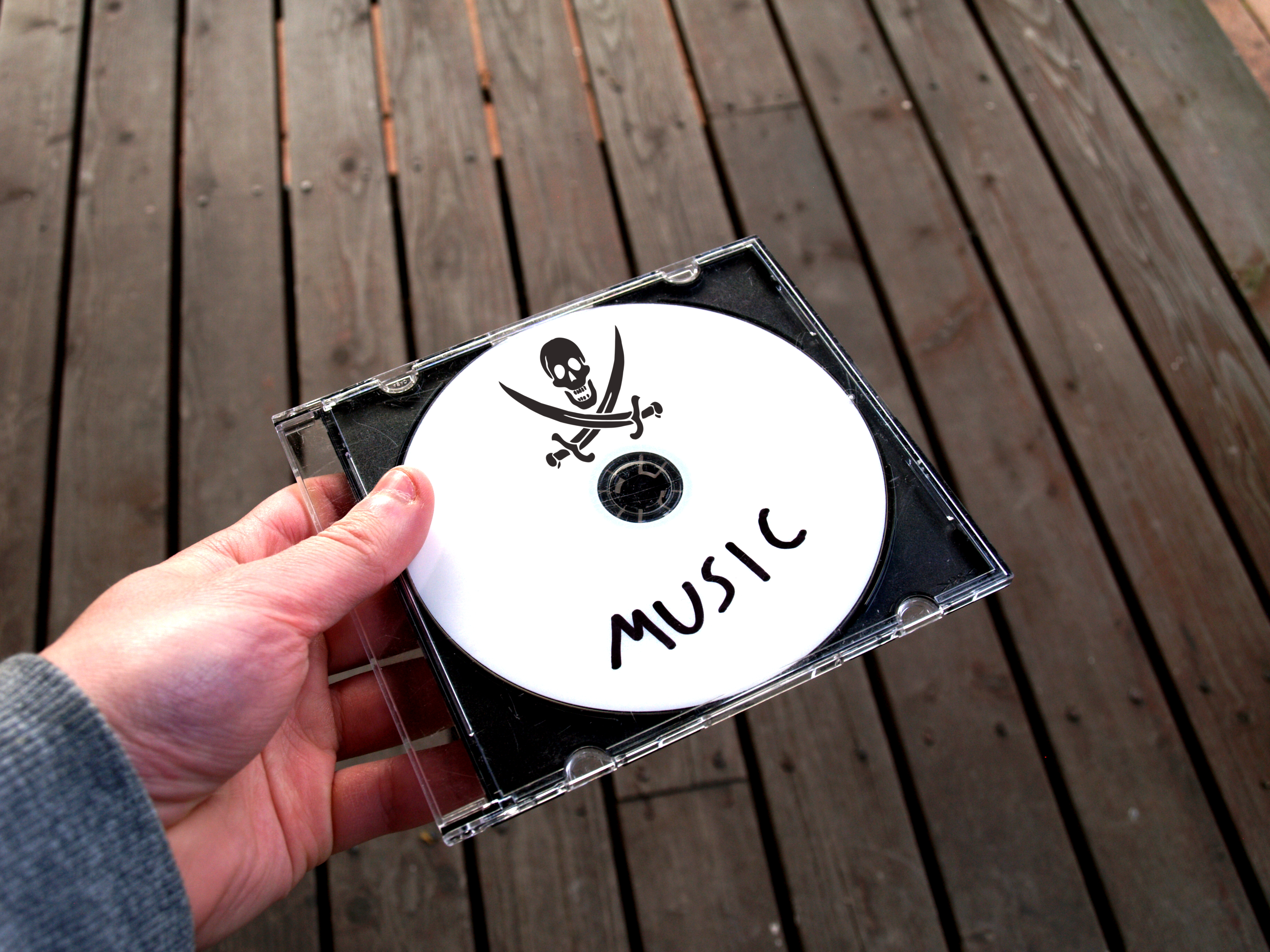
Piracy music CD

Music piracy is the copying and distribution of musical compositions and their associated sound recordings for which the rights owners (composer, recording artist, or copyright-holding record company) did not give consent. Unauthorized copies of musical works have taken many forms throughout modern history, including sheet music, perforated piano rolls, and recordings of musical performances made or duplicated without the consent of the performers.

In the contemporary legal environment, music piracy is a form of copyright infringement, which may be a civil wrong or a crime depending on the jurisdiction. In the early 20th century, however, loopholes in copyright laws enabled companies to sell mechanical reproductions of copyrighted music, including piano rolls and phonograph records, without compensating the copyright owners or the performers on the recordings. Two international treaties, the Rome Convention (1961) and the Geneva Phonograms Convention (1971), secured protection under national copyright and related rights frameworks to the performers and producers of sound recordings.

The late 20th and early 21st centuries saw much controversy over the ethics of redistributing media content, how much production and distribution companies in the media were losing, and the very scope of what ought to be considered piracy – and cases involving the piracy of music were among the most frequently discussed in the debate.

== History ==
=== Early 1900s: Sheet music and birth of sound recording ===
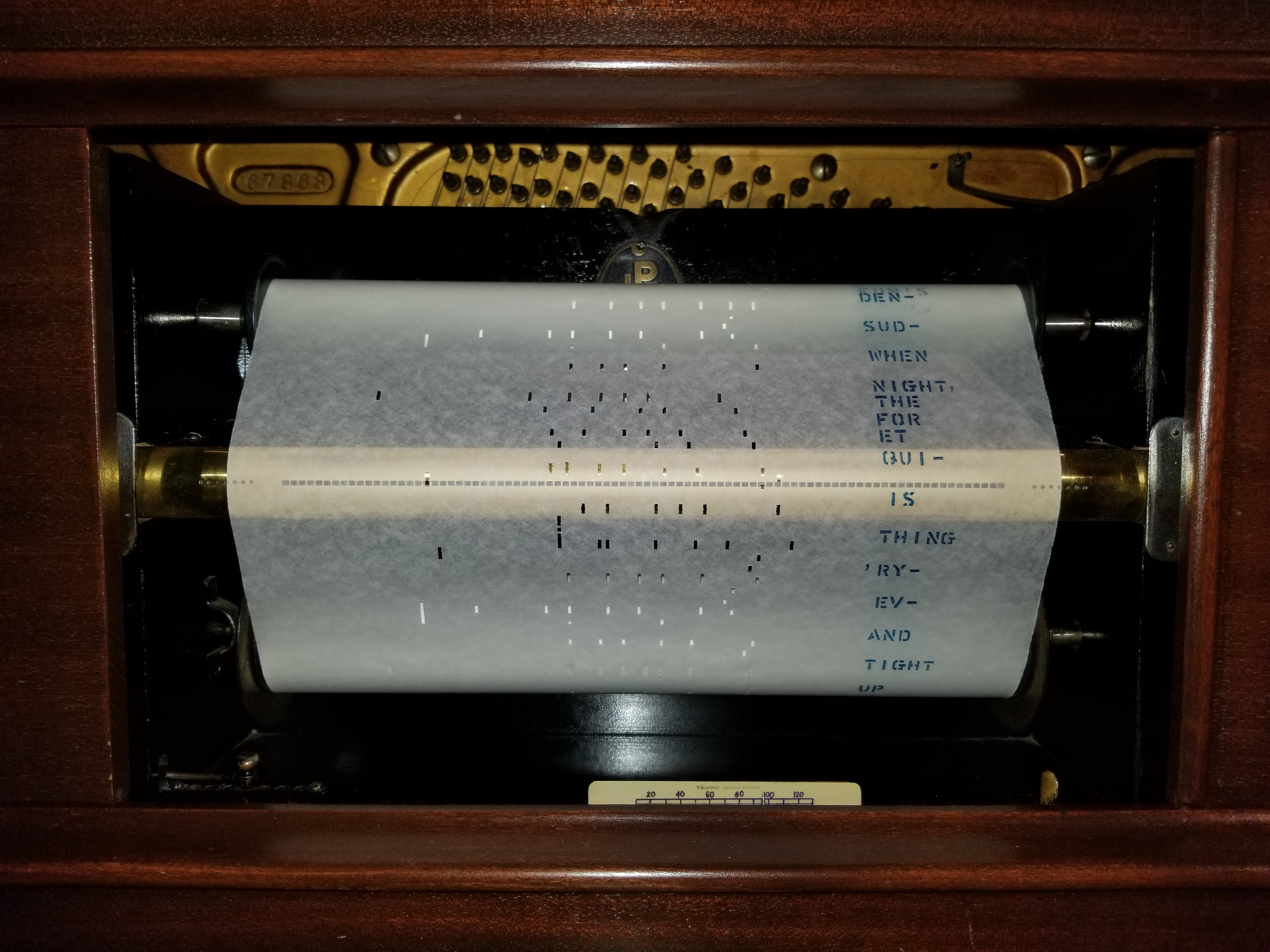
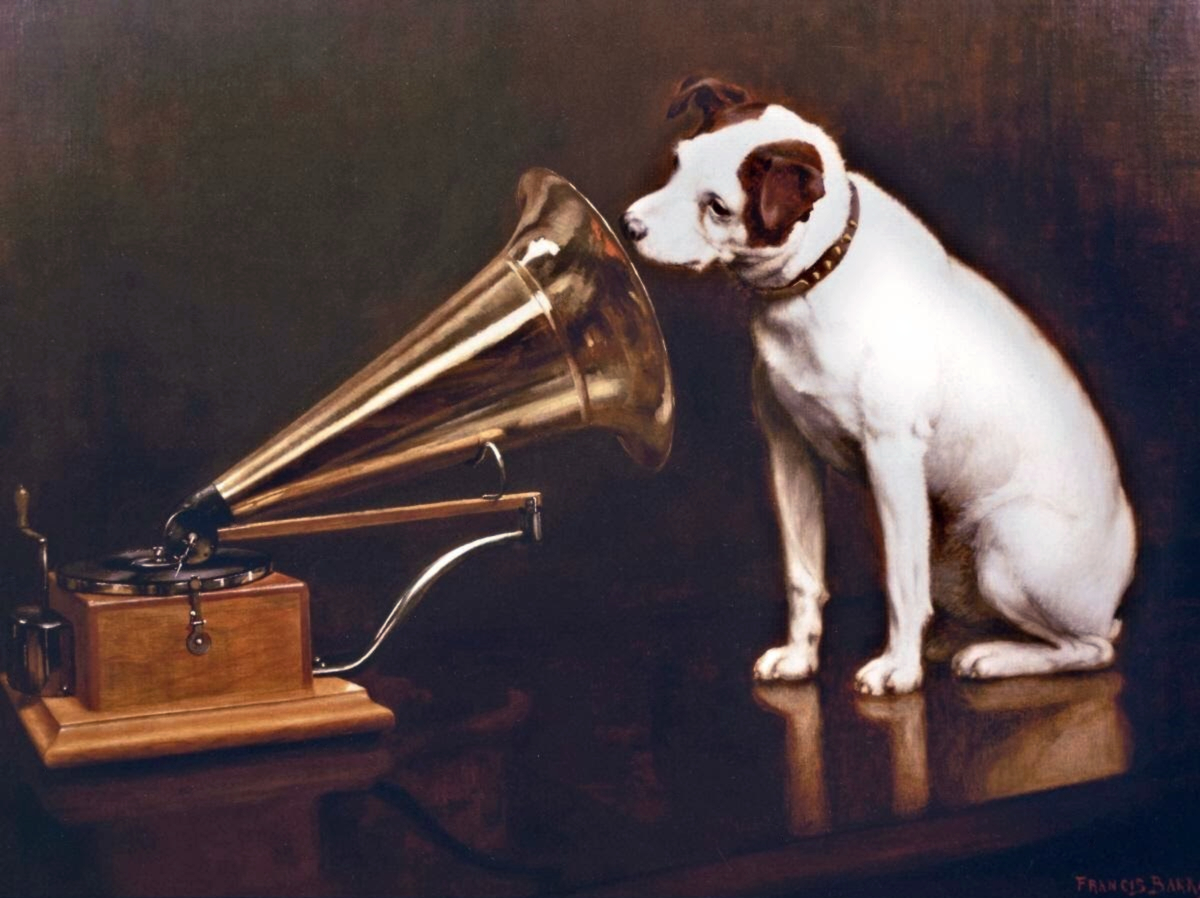
New sound reproduction technologies, including player pianos and phonographs, presented novel economic and legal challenges for music copyright owners in the early 20th century.

Music piracy was a widespread issue in the United States at the turn of the 20th century. New technologies like photolithography enabled infringers to make highly accurate, unauthorized copies of sheet music at low cost. This led to an asymmetry between pirates and music publishers, as enforcement of copyrights was expensive and often difficult. At a conference in New York City in 1905, music publisher George W. Furniss complained that, while pirates could print illicit copies quickly and for about $10–15, "it will cost several hundred dollars to capture a few pirated copies, with no chance of getting any relief from the individuals in that line of business." Furthermore, the high accuracy of photographic reproduction sometimes made it difficult for investigators to positively identify counterfeits.

At the same time, advancements in sound recording and reproduction, like player pianos and phonographs, created new legal quandaries for music publishers and composers as well as the producers of sound recordings. Before the Copyright Act of 1909, the copyright in a musical composition only extended to visually perceptible copies like sheet music; whether mechanical reproductions were considered "copies" under the present law was in doubt. Indeed, in the Supreme Court case White-Smith Music Publishing Co. v. Apollo Co. (1908), the Apollo Company argued that paper piano rolls were parts of a machine and therefore in the scope of patent law, "and are not copyrightable merely because of incidentally being able to perform some part of the function of things copyrightable." The Court unanimously sided with Apollo, writing that the copyright law of the time only covered expressions of a work that could be seen by the naked eye. By contrast, the information on piano rolls and phonograph records could only be perceived with the aid of a machine.

The nascent recording industry was also plagued by unauthorized duplication of sound recordings. When record players, then known as phonographs or "talking machines", were introduced in the late 19th century, they were considered novelty goods, valued mostly for their ability to replicate the human voice. Manufacturers sold phonograph cylinders and disks with pre-recorded performances of songs, speeches, and stories, but these recordings served mainly to show off how well their devices reproduced sounds rather than to market the performances themselves. These recordings were often duplicated and resold by competitors, and the makers of original recordings responded by emphasizing their higher sound quality compared to the fakes when marketing them to customers. Cummings (2013) argues that the contemporary phonograph market recognized duplicate recordings as distinct products from originals and that listeners "did not necessarily identify one recorded performance as the exclusive product of one record company."

The practice of selling duplicates of sound recordings drew criticism from the recording artists who produced them. Early recording artist Russell Hunting decried this form of record piracy, but his complaint focused on the inferior sound quality of the unauthorized copies rather than the skill and labor that went into the recordings themselves.

In August 1906, the British Parliament passed the Musical Copyright Act 1906, also known as the T.P. O'Connor Bill, following many of the popular music writers at the time dying in poverty due to extensive piracy during the piracy crisis of sheet music in the early 20th century. Sheet music peddlers would often buy a copy of the music at full price, copy it, and resell it, often at half the price of the original. The law provided criminal penalties for unauthorized printing and selling of "pirated copies of any musical work", and allowed for their seizure and destruction by courts, but excluded perforated piano rolls and phonograph records. Music publishing associations hired police officers and former soldiers to raid printing presses and shops, confiscating sheet music from street sellers. The film I'll Be Your Sweetheart (1945), commissioned by the British Ministry of Information, is based on the events of the day.

Three years later, the United States Congress passed the Copyright Act of 1909, which addressed the perceived failure of the prior copyright law to adapt to new technologies. The Act extended the scope of copyright in musical works to mechanical reproductions, whether in piano rolls or in phonograph records, while providing for a compulsory mechanical license to prevent any one company from monopolizing the industry. However, the Act did not grant copyright protection to sound recordings themselves, allowing record piracy to proliferate.

=== 1930s–50s: Rise of record piracy, bootlegging, and radio ===
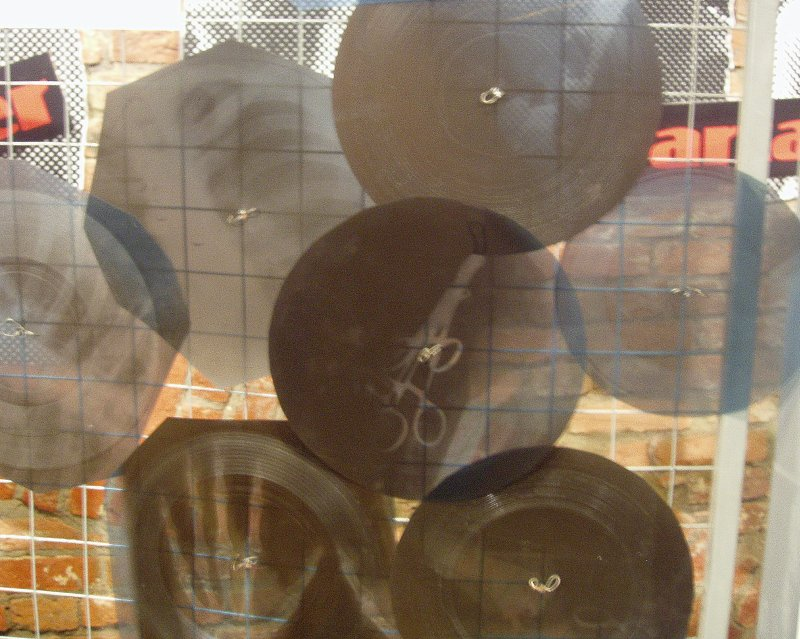
Soviet X-ray records, or "ribs", made from discarded medical images in the 1950s

Even after the passage of the 1909 Copyright Act in the United States, legal protection for sound recordings and performances was weak, consisting of a patchwork of judge-made doctrines such as unfair competition and misappropriation. Radio stations often broadcast pieces of recorded music without the approval of the recording artists who performed on them. Meanwhile, bootleggers made recordings of live performances or radio broadcasts from opera houses and the like and sold them on the black market.

Live musical performances were part of early radio programming and were a lucrative source of income for musicians. But in the 1930s, radio stations started to substitute pre-recorded performances for live ones without the consent of the performers who recorded them. In response, the American Federation of Musicians coordinated recording strikes, and bandleaders sued radio stations for unauthorized broadcasting of their sound recordings, invoking common law copyright (which included a public performance right) and unfair competition. Courts had different responses to these issues: in Waring v. WDAS, the Pennsylvania Supreme Court held that sound recordings were subject to common law copyright because they were still considered "unpublished" even though they had been sold to the public. By contrast, the U.S. Court of Appeals for the Second Circuit held in RCA v. Whiteman that the recordings had been published and so were unprotected by common law copyright.

In the 1950s, recordings of banned Western music were imported into the Soviet Union and pressed on phonograph discs made from discarded X-ray films. These "X-ray records" are credited with introducing record piracy to the USSR.

=== 1960s–70s: Legal protections for sound recordings ===
The development of magnetic tape recording technology lowered the cost of recording and copying music, leading to an epidemic of tape piracy in the 1960s. "Pirates" took advantage of the compulsory mechanical license under federal copyright law, flooding the U.S. Copyright Office with notices of intention bearing hundreds of song titles, to duplicate existing sound recordings, which were not protected under federal law. However, music publishers refused to accept these notices and any proffered royalty payments, believing that copying of existing sound recordings was outside the scope of the compulsory mechanical license.

In response, U.S. states began to pass laws criminalizing the unauthorized duplication and sale of sound recordings. New York became the first state to pass an anti–record piracy statute in 1967; California followed suit in 1968. Congress passed the Sound Recording Amendment on November 15, 1971, bringing sound recordings under federal copyright protection for the first time. The law came into effect on February 15, 1972.

=== 1990s–present: Growth of digital piracy ===
The invention of the Internet and digital media created music piracy in its modern form. With the invention of newer technology that allowed for the piracy process to become less complicated, it became much more common. Users of the web began adding media files to the internet, and prior potential risks and difficulties to pirating music, such as the physicality of the process, were eliminated. It was much easier for people with little to no knowledge of technology and old piracy methods to gather media files.

The first application that demonstrated the implications of music piracy was Napster. Napster enabled users to exchange music files over a common free server without any regard for copyright laws. Napster was quickly shut down after lawsuits filed by Metallica and Dr. Dre and a separate lawsuit in regards to the Digital Millennium Copyright Act. Other music sharing services such as Limewire continued to be a resource to those searching for free music files. These platforms were also removed after a few years of service due to copyright laws and the Digital Millennium Copyright Act. After finding some loopholes, piracy began to exist in more legal forms, an example being Pirate Bay. This technical legality was due to the format of the websites and their country of origin and administration. The websites were set up so that the site itself did not host any of the illegal files, but gave the user a map as to where they could access the files. Additionally, in Pirate Bay's case, the website was hosted under Swedish law, where this "map" was not illegal.

==== Arguments over legality ====
Fearing an impact on potential sales from internet piracy, industry associations like the Recording Industry Association of America (RIAA) lobbied for stricter laws and more severe punishments of those breaking copyright law. Record companies have also turned to technological barriers to copying, such as DRM, to some controversy. These organizations have tried to add more controls to the digital copy of the music to prevent consumers from copying the music. For the most part, the music industry has argued that, if not DRM, then some similar measures are necessary for them to continue to make a profit.

Critics of the record companies' strategy have proposed that the attempts to maintain sales rates are impeding the rights of legitimate listeners to use and listen to the music as they wish. When the US Congress passed the Copyright Act of 1909, it deliberately gave less copyright control to music composers than that of novelists: "Its fear was the monopoly power of rights holders, and that that power would stifle follow-on creativity". According to the internationally established Organisation for Economic Co-operation and Development, "Existing laws and regulations may be too broad and general to deal adequately with the rapid technological developments that facilitate digital piracy, and policy makers may need to consider enacting some specific provisions to deal with these infringements. Such provisions should not unduly impede legitimate digital communications, nor unreasonably impact on the Internet as an effective communications platform, commercial channel and educational tool..."

There have been several means of free access to copyrighted music for the general public including Napster, Limewire, and Spotify. Napster was a free file sharing software created by college student Shawn Fanning to enable people to share and trade music files in mp3 format. Napster became hugely popular because it made it so easy to share and download music files. However, the heavy metal band Metallica sued the company for copyright infringement. This led to other artists following suit and shutting down Napster's service. Likewise, Limewire was a free peer-to-peer file sharing software similar to that of Napster. The software enabled unlimited file sharing between computers and ended being one of the most popular sharing networks around. Like Napster, Limewire struggled through multiple legal battles and inevitably wound up being shut down. Spotify and other on-demand streaming services are offering a way for consumers to still get their music for free while also contributing to the musician in a small way instead of simply illegally downloading the music, but it also moves customers away from buying hard copies of music or even legally downloading songs which is severely reducing artists' income.

According to the Recording Industry Association of America (RIAA) since Shawn Fanning started the program file sharing program Napster in 1999 music revenue has gone down 53% from $14.6 billion to $7.0 billion in 2013.

==== Law enforcement ====
The RIAA, a powerful lobby for the recording industry, is responsible for carrying out most of the lawsuits against music piracy in the United States. Enforcement of music piracy laws, which may cost copyright violators up to $150,000 per infringement, has been considered by some to be unreasonable, violating constitutional protections against cruel and unusual punishment. RIAA has been accused of outright bullying, as when one of their lawyers told the defendant in one lawsuit, "You don't want to pay another visit to a dentist like me". In that same case, according to Lawrence Lessig, "the RIAA insisted it would not settle the case until it took every penny [the defendant] had saved".

Further attempts at progress towards controlling the privacy of public media content by targeting the elimination of piracy were made when the highly anticipated yet often debated bill known as the Stop Online Piracy Act (SOPA) was proposed in October 2011 by the United States House representative Lamar S. Smith. The general scope of the law was to fulfill the goal of putting a stop to online piracy by expanding upon existing criminal laws regarding copyright violations. The essential goal of the bill was to protect intellectual property of content creators by raising awareness of the severity of punishments for copyright infringement. Naturally, the bill was met with considerable opposition from various parties. One instance of this was an article comment by Edward J. Black, president and CEO of the Computer & Communications Industry Association, who questioned the potential effectiveness of the bill by reasoning that the major pirate websites that SOPA attempts to eliminate could just as easily respawn under a different name if taken down as early as a few hours later. Additionally, strong protest attempts were made across the internet when numerous high-profile online organizations including Tumblr, Facebook, Twitter, and participating in American Censorship Day on January 18, with some sites including Reddit and Wikipedia going as far as completely blacking out all of their pages, redirecting the user to SOPA protest messages. Ultimately, as a result of aggressive protests and lack of consenting opinions within the congress, SOPA was tabled on January 20 by its creator, House representative Lamar Smith.

== Taxonomy ==
Some authors distinguish between "bootleg", "counterfeit", and "pirate" records. "Counterfeits" and "pirates" are unauthorized reproductions of previously published musical recordings. Counterfeit records are those that imitate the packaging of an officially released record in order to pass themselves off as authentic ones. On the other hand, "pirate" records contain already published recordings but with different cover art or track listings from official releases. According to Gonzalez (1977), "counterfeit" records have labels that are "exact duplicates of the original", whereas "pirate" records do not.

By contrast, "bootlegs" are recordings made or released without authorization from the performers or their record labels, such as concert recordings and leaked studio outtakes. Sociologist Lee Marshall claims that bootleg recordings often "supplement" official releases, unlike pirates or counterfeits, which act as economic substitutes. According to Cummings (2013), however, these categories are not rigid: many pirate records combine previously released and unreleased material, making them resemble bootlegs.

== Economic ramifications ==
Piracy's actual effect on music sales is difficult to accurately assess. In neoclassical economics prices are determined by the combination of the forces of supply and demand, but the participators in the digital market do not always follow the usual motives and behaviors of the supply and demand system. First, the cost of digital distribution is minuscule in comparison to the costs of distribution by former methods. Furthermore, the majority of the filesharing community will distribute copies of music for a zero price in monetary terms, and there are some consumers who are willing to pay a certain price for legitimate copies even when they could just as easily obtain pirated copies, such as with pay what you want vendors.

Another issue is that because many people in the world illegally download music because they cannot afford to purchase legitimate copies, not every illegal download equates to a lost sale. This has some effect on music sales, but as Lawrence Lessig points out, there is wide asymmetry between the estimated volume of illegal downloading and the projected loss of sales:

In 2002, the RIAA reported that CD sales had fallen by 8.9 percent, from 882 million to 803 million units; revenues fell 6.7 percent. This confirms a trend over the past few years. The RIAA blames Internet piracy for the trend, though there are many other causes that could account for this drop. SoundScan, for example, reports a more than 20 percent drop in the number of CDs released since 1999. That no doubt accounts for some of the decrease in sales... But let's assume the RIAA is right, and all of the decline in CD sales is because of Internet sharing. Here's the rub: In the same period that the RIAA estimates that 803 million CDs were sold, the RIAA estimates that 2.1 billion CDs were downloaded for free. Thus, although 2.6 times the total number of CDs sold were downloaded for free, sales revenue fell by just 6.7 percent... [So] there is a huge difference between downloading a song and stealing a CD.

University of Idaho professor Darryl Woolley, writing in the Academy of Information and Management Sciences Journal in 2010, shared an estimate of 12.5 billion dollars lost annually due to file sharing and music piracy, and 5 billion of that is profits lost from the music industry directly. Due to this loss in profits the music industry has been forced to cut down their staffing. Music piracy has become such an issue that the industry is encouraged to adapt to this new era and change.

== Digital copies ==
The article, "The Music Industry On (The) Line? Surviving Music Piracy In A Digital Era" by Jelle Janssens, Stijn Vandaele, and Tom Vander Beken presents an analysis of the prevalence of piracy in music trade, which has affected the global sales of CDs. This article points out that technological development such as file sharing, MP3 players, and CDRs have increased music piracy. The most common forms of music piracy are Internet Piracy and compact disc piracy. It also discusses the association between music piracy and organized crime, which is defined as profit-driven illegal activities. The fact that digital products are virtual instead of physical affects the economic mechanisms behind the production and distribution of content, and how piracy works for digital as opposed to physical products: "the main consequence of the non-physical form of digital products is their virtually negligible marginal cost of reproduction and their ability to be digitally delivered." The cost of burning a CD drastically lowered the overhead for record companies, as well as for music pirates, and with the growing tendency toward online distribution among legitimate and illicit distributors alike, the expense of distributing shrunk further from the costs of printing and transporting CDs to merely the costs of maintaining a website. By sheer volume of file transfers, though, distributing music through traditional web servers and FTP servers were not as popular as peer-to-peer (P2P) now, because the traditional direct download method is slower.

The 2008 British Music Rights survey showed that 80% of people in Britain wanted a legal P2P service. This was consistent with the results of earlier research conducted in the United States, upon which the Open Music Model was based. In addition, the majority of filesharers in the survey preferred to get their music from "local sources" such as LAN connections, email, flash drives, sharing with other people they know personally. The other most common method of filesharing was with P2P technologies. By 2007, P2P networks' popularity had grown so much that they used as much as 39% of the total volume of information exchanged over the internet.

Statistics have shown that since the early 2010s, there has been a decline in music piracy. According to a NPD survey, in 2012, approximately one in ten Internet users in the United States downloaded music through a file sharing service similar to BitTorrent or LimeWire. This number is significantly less than 2005, the peak of the piracy phenomenon, when one in five users used peer-to-peer networks to gather music files. The emergence of free streaming services has decreased the number of users who pirate music on the internet. Services such as Spotify and Pandora have easy-to-use interfaces and decrease the risk for computer viruses and spyware. In comparison to the illegal software used by older music piracy networks such as Napster or Limewire, current music streaming services such as Spotify and Rdio offer cheap yet legal access to copyrighted music by paying the rights holders through money made off of payments made by premium users and through advertisements.

== See also ==
- Bootleg recording
- Music industry
- Music copyright infringement in the People's Republic of China
- Music download
- Music leak
- Online piracy
- Legal aspects of file sharing
- Trade group efforts against file sharing
- Anontune, a music site by Anonymous
- File sharing
- Activated Content
- Indian Music Industry
