= Randy Saaf =

Randy Saaf is the CEO of PlayCubed, maker of AI-powered investment research mobile app Unvault.AI. Former CEO of Lucid Sight, a game studio that has released several VR titles for the PlayStation, Gear, and Google Daydream. Saaf co-founded OnSystems in 2000 which specialized in encrypted P2P messaging and file transfer. Saaf was the chief executive officer, and founder, of MediaDefender, Inc., which was purchased by ARTISTdirect, Inc. in 2005 for $42.5 million in cash. Saaf co-founded Jirbo, a large developer of iPhone games, in 2008. Jirbo rebranded itself to AdColony and was sold to Opera Software for $350 million. Saaf co-founded AlphaGenius. AlphaGenius is an investment and technology development firm that farms social media data and produces trading models for the hedge fund industry.

== Biography ==
Saaf speaks frequently about how VR and blockchain will change gaming.

Saaf has testified before Congress on Internet copyright violation at least three times, and has worked with Senator Patrick Leahy, Senator Arlen Specter, and Senator Orrin Hatch to prevent infringement. In 2004, he donated $2,000 to California Senator Barbara Boxer.

Saaf appeared in a “60 Minutes” segment on copyright infringement on 31 October 2003, where he talked about his efforts to prevent it. He has also been a prime source for other leading news organizations, and has authored many articles against unauthorized media distribution.

A Fresno native, Saaf attended the University of California, Irvine, after graduating from Edison Computech High School (in 1994). He then transferred to Harvey Mudd College and graduated in 1998. Saaf graduated with a B.S. degree in engineering.

He spent less than a year with defense technology giant Raytheon, where he worked closely with airborne signal processing—systems that extinguish incoming missiles. Saaf left Raytheon to start the website with friends, InterFriendly.net. It was designed to use P2P technology to give small businesses the ability to transfer large and numerous files.

He then enrolled in the UCLA School of Law. A year later, he left, noting that "Law was too technical of a vocation for me."

== See also ==
- Anti-copyright
