= Cristina Patwa =

American businesswoman

Cristina Magno Patwa
- Born: Cristina Marie Abrina Magno
- Education: Boston University; UCLA Anderson School of Management
- Occupations: Co-CEO, FactoryMade Ventures
- Board member of: El Rey Network; Tres Pistoleros Studios
- Website: factorymade.com

Cristina "Cris" Magno Patwa is the co-CEO of FactoryMade Ventures, a Los Angeles–based entertainment and media incubator.

== Early life and education ==
Patwa, who grew up in the Philippines, attended Boston University. Following her graduation, she attended the Anderson School of Management at UCLA, and was awarded an MBA in 2007. She was licensed as a CPA in California in 2011.

== Career ==
After a brief tenure at Fox Filmed Entertainment, Patwa was hired by Disney ABC Television as a director of business development. She remained at Disney ABC until 2008, when she joined William Morris Endeavor (WME) as vice president, Intellectual Property. She was named Senior Vice President and Head of Strategic Planning and Business Development in 2009.

At WME, in addition to working with Telefonica and JC Penney, Patwa served as an advisor to toy company Hasbro on the Transformers and GI Joe film franchises. She helped develop the creation of Hasbro Studios' Hub Network (with Discovery Communications) and on the development and launch of HSN's online gaming and e-commerce platform HSN Arcade. Patwa worked closely with WME founding board member John Fogelman during her tenure at the company.

In 2011, Patwa and Fogelman left WME to found FactoryMade Ventures as its Co-CEO. At launch, the company announced alliances with Hasbro, Telefonica, RTL Group, director Michael Bay, filmmaker Robert Rodriguez, producer Thom Beers and comedian Whoopi Goldberg, in addition to filmmaker J. J. Abrams, who was then a principal investor. Abrams withdrew from the company in January 2012, reportedly due to his schedule. In November 2014, Japanese conglomerate Mitsui & Co. purchased a minority stake in FactoryMade.

In December 2013, Patwa partnered with Robert Rodriguez to create the El Rey network, an English language American television channel targeting Latino audiences. In addition to serving on the board of directors for FactoryMade and El Rey, Patwa is an executive producer for Rodriguez' original series From Dusk Til Dawn, and El Rey's second original scripted series, Matador. She is on the board of directors for Tres Pistoleros Studios, which she co-founded, and is an executive producer for the studio's Director's Chair, Lucha Underground, Cutting Crew and, with Scott and Dierdre Gurney, an untitled Vice Mexico series.
