= Matador (American TV series) =

American television series

- Genre: Action; Drama
- Created by: Roberto Orci; Andrew Orci; Dan Dworkin; Jay Beattie
- Starring: Gabriel Luna; Nicky Whelan; Neil Hopkins; Alfred Molina; Tanc Sade
- Country of origin: United States
- Original language: English
- No. of seasons: 1
- No. of episodes: 13

Production
- Executive producers: Jay Beattie; Dan Dworkin; Roberto Orci; Alex Kurtzman; Heather Kadin; Robert Rodriguez
- Production companies: K/O Paper Products; Rodriguez International Pictures; FactoryMade Ventures; Entertainment One

Original release
- Network: El Rey Network
- Release: July 15 – October 7, 2014

Matador is an American television series co-created by Roberto Orci, Andrew Orci, Dan Dworkin, and Jay Beattie. The series chronicled the rise of popular soccer star Tony "Matador" Bravo (Gabriel Luna), known for his exploits both on and off the field. Unbeknownst to the public and his family, he is also a skilled covert operative performing missions for a branch of the CIA. The series premiered on July 15, 2014, on the newly launched channel El Rey Network.

Executive producers are showrunners Beattie and Dworkin, Roberto Orci, Alex Kurtzman, and Heather Kadin of K/O Paper Products, and Robert Rodriguez along with FactoryMade Ventures and El Rey Network co-founders John Fogelman and Cristina Patwa. Beattie and Dworkin wrote the first episode, which was directed by Rodriguez.

Despite originally being renewed for a second season prior to its premiere, El Rey canceled the show, citing a lack of international success.

== Plot ==
In this scripted action series, Tony Bravo (Gabriel Luna) is a DEA agent recruited by the CIA to infiltrate the Los Angeles Riot, a professional soccer team. The CIA suspects the Riot's owner, Andrés Galan (Alfred Molina), of using his vast resources to fund illicit activities. During team tryouts, Bravo seriously injures one of the Riot players in a confrontation on the field, initially earning the ire of the owner and the team. When footage of the incident goes viral, earning Bravo the nickname "Matador", Galan sees marketing potential in his popular new star.

== Cast and characters ==
=== Main ===
- Gabriel Luna as Tony "Matador" Bravo, soccer player for the L.A. Riot and CIA mole
- Nicky Whelan as Annie Mason
- Neil Hopkins as Noah Peacott
- Alfred Molina as Andrés Galan, owner of the L.A. Riot soccer franchise
- Tanc Sade as Alec Holester, star striker for the L.A. Riot and former English National Player

=== Recurring ===
- Yvette Monreal as Senna Galan, a celebutante and daughter of L.A. Riot team owner Andrés Galan
- Elizabeth Peña as Maritza Sandoval, mother to Tony, Ricky, and Cristina
- Julio Oscar Mechoso as Javi Sandoval, Maritza's husband, stepfather to Tony, and father to Ricky, and Cristina
- Louis Ozawa Changchien as Samuel, Galan's dangerous chief enforcer and right hand man
- Sammi Rotibi as Didi Akinyele, assistant head coach for the L.A. Riot
- Jonny Cruz as Ricky Sandoval, son of Maritza and Javi, who was initially in prison
- Paul Ben-Victor as Gene Balasco
- Isabella Gomez as Cristina Sandoval, teenage daughter of Maritza and Javi
- Peter Gadiot as Caesar, a former dancer
- Christopher Cousins as CIA Deputy Director Llewyn Wayne Smith, who is in charge of the department recruiting Tony
- Eve Torres as Reyna Flores, a sideline journalist reporting on Tony's career
- Margot Bingham as Abigail "Billie" Fisher, a CIA analyst

== Production ==
Production for Matador began on April 3, 2014.

== Reception ==
Matador has received favorable reviews. On Metacritic, the show holds a score of 62 out of 100, based on 10 critics, indicating "generally favorable" reviews. On Rotten Tomatoes, the show holds a rating of 67% based on 12 reviews, with the consensus reading: "Though choppy at times, Matador is fast-paced, silly fun that benefits from not taking itself too seriously".

== Episodes ==
No.	Title	Directed by	Written by	Original release date
1	"Quid Go Pro"	Robert Rodriguez	Story by : Roberto Orci, Andrew Orci, Dan Dworkin & Jay Beattie; Teleplay by : Dan Dworkin, Jay Beattie & Roberto Orci	July 15, 2014
DEA Agent Tony Bravo gets recruited to investigate the L.A. Riot soccer team by going undercover as a player. Cameo Appearance Demi Lovato, Wilmer Valderrama and James Pallotta.
2	"The Naked and the Dead"	Nick Copus	Dan Dworkin & Jay Beattie	July 22, 2014
A hired assassin, called the "Apothecary," is tracked to retrieve codes stolen from Gideon Khan's tablet computer.
3	"Idol Worship"	Nick Copus	Steve Lichtman	July 29, 2014
Tony accompanies Margot to an auction, where he bonds with Galan. Meanwhile, reporter Reyna Flores investigates Tony.
4	"Code Red Card"	Stephen Williams	Evan Bleiweiss	August 5, 2014
Tony's appearance on L.A. Riot is compromised when Senna gets into trouble. Meanwhile, Annie and Noah learn more about Galan.
5	"Enter the Worm"	Dwight H. Little	Glen Whitman	August 12, 2014
Tony, Holester, and Caesar land in Nicaragua, where druglord Gaspar "The Worm" Calera rules.
6	"Misanthropology"	Larry Teng	John Humber	August 19, 2014
Tony's focus shifts from soccer back to the mission when Galan entrusts him to deliver a package. Elsewhere, the link between the auction and Nicaragua clears when the CIA rescues an anthropology professor with insight into pre-Olmec civilizations.
7	"Mano A Mano"	Joseph E. Gallagher	Joy Blake	August 26, 2014
Galan attends Cristina's quinceañera; Noah is taken by Samuel, when he goes undercover as a medical sales rep.
8	"Everything Old is New Again"	Paul A. Edwards	Steve Litchman	September 2, 2014
With Peacott in a coma, Bravo and Mason follow up leads as they try to determine if Bravo's cover has been compromised. Meanwhile, more of the international plot is revealed to Galan, and Samuel continues to investigate Bravo's past.
9	"Wells Fargo Presents: The Anguish of Rosarito"	Matt Earl Beesley	Evan Bleiweiss	September 9, 2014
After a plane load of passengers are infected by the virus, Galan seems to have doubts about his involvement. Things come to a head.
10	"Night of the Whale"	Roxann Dawson	Glen Whitman	September 16, 2014
Tony and Galan reach common ground over a body in the trunk. Meanwhile, the CIA reach out to Sayer, hoping to thwart his plan.
11	"Riot 'Til I Die'"	Josh Butler	Jeremy Kaufman & Rosalind Ross	September 23, 2014
The CIA uses Samuel's demise to create an opportunity to draw out Sayer, while Deputy Director Smith enlists private sector assistance in combating the virus. Reyna Flores returns, bent on exacting vengeance upon Galan, and the operation to track down Sayer and his lab goes badly awry.
12	"Dead Dreaming in Bagan"	Joe Gallagher	Joy Blake	September 30, 2014
Tony enters the Myanmar rainforest, dodging Sayer's men, and finds a secret laboratory. Mason, Peacott and Smith work with Galan to locate the facility, leading to a terrible decision for Mason. Senna learns the truth about her mother, and Mason sets Karen straight about her relationship with Bravo.
13	"Mala Sangre"	Robert Rodriguez	Dan Dworkin & Jay Beattie	October 7, 2014
Sayer's endgame is revealed and Tony's relationships change forever.
