= Steve Rennie =

American talent manager and entrepreneur (born 1965)

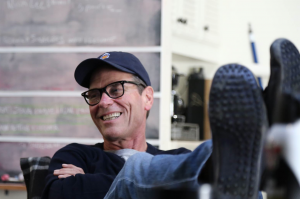
- Born: June 6, 1965 (age 60); Augusta, GA
- Occupations: Entrepreneur, music industry executive
- Years active: 1980–present
- Employer(s): Founder, RenmanMB and RENManagement
- Website: https://www.renmanmb.com

Steve "Renman" Rennie (born June 8, 1955) is an American talent manager and entrepreneur. He is the founder of RENManagement and RenmanMB, a platform that offers industry guidance for musicians.

== Career ==
Rennie began his music career booking concerts at USC. In 1980 he founded Rennie Presents to promote concerts independently. Booking concerts in the secondary markets that surrounded Los Angeles, he promoted up and coming 'new wave' bands including the Motels, The Plimsouls, Adam Ant, X, the Blasters, Mötley Crüe and INXS. On New Year's Eve 1983, he booked The Motels at the Beverly Theater in Beverly Hills, beating out established promoters for the LA show.

In 1983 he was hired by Southern California concert promoter, Avalon Attractions. In 1990—by then a senior vice president—he left Avalon to found REN Management Corporation, where he managed bands including Dramarama, The Wonder Stuff, Ned's Atomic Dustbin, The The, and Primal Scream.

In 1994, he was named senior vice president/general manager of Epic Records. An early advocate of music marketing on the web, he developed online campaigns for Epic artists including Incubus, who he helped to sign, and Korn, who were the first band to appear live on the internet to promote a new album.

In 1998 Rennie left Epic to become president of UBL, a division of the early internet site ARTISTdirect. When Rennie informed the members of Incubus that he would be leaving Epic to join ARTISTdirect, guitarist Mike Einziger asked Rennie to co-manage the band. Rennie accepted the offer and stayed at ARTISTdirect until 2000, when he left the company to manage the band on a full-time basis. Shortly thereafter, the band released their breakthrough multi platinum selling album MAKE YOURSELF. The band went on to have a #1 Billboard Top 100 album, two #2 albums and a dozen Top 10 alternative radio hits. During his tenure as manager the band built a substantial global touring business. He managed Incubus until 2014, when he shifted his focus to RenmanMB.
