= Tanc Sade =

Australian actor, writer and director

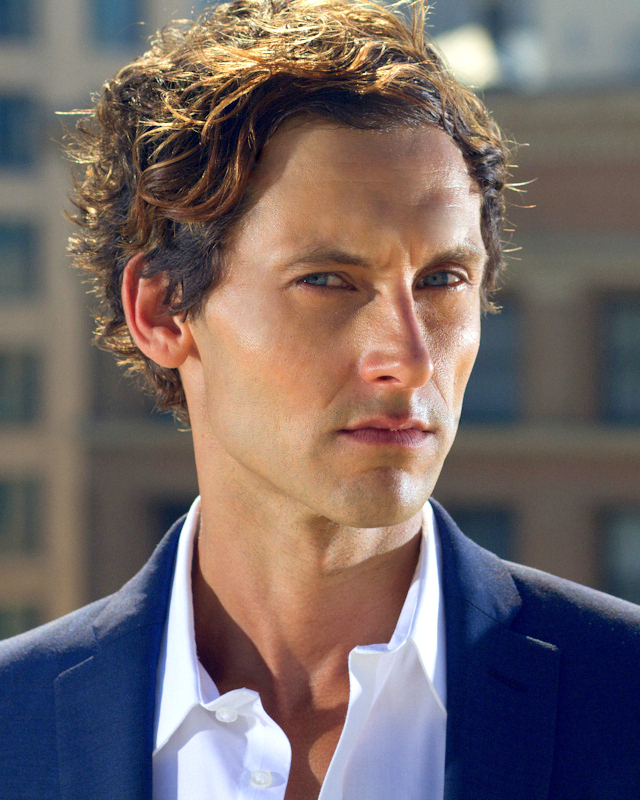
- Tanc Sade in October 2014
- Born: Sydney, Australia
- Occupations: Actor, director
- Years active: 2002–present

Tanc Sade is an Australian actor, writer and director. Sade worked in several theatre productions in Australia before landing a recurring role on Gilmore Girls in 2005.

== Career ==
Sade appeared in the quirky role of "Finn" in the cult series Gilmore Girls. He played the role of Christopher House in the series Roadies, which lasted for one season. Sade played Alec Holester in Matador, composed of 13 hour-long episodes, which debuted in July 2014. He appeared in Childhood's End based on the Arthur C. Clarke novel of the same name. Sade appeared in the 2012 film Stolen, as well as Sons of Anarchy, The Mentalist, The Resident, Body of Proof, 90210, CSI: Miami, and CSI: NY. He wrote and directed Flowers and Weeds starring Terence Stamp.

== Athletic career ==
In 2012, Sade broke the Australian National Dynamic Freediving record by swimming 218 metres (715 ft) on a single breath of air. He was later crowned Australian National champion of the same year.

In 2013, Sade broke the Australian National Dynamic No-fins record with a swim of 177 metres (581 ft).

== Filmography ==
=== Film ===
Year	Title	Role	Notes
2002	Code 2	George	Short film
2007	Sex and Death 101	Beta	
2007	After Sex	Freddy	
2008	Flowers and Weeds	Joshua	Short film
2012	Not That Funny	Tyler	
2012	Stolen	Pete	
2013	January Man	January Man	Short film
2014	Hollows Grove	George	
2016	Queen of Hearts	West	Short film, completed

=== Television ===
Year	Title	Role	Notes
2002	Young Lions	Steve	"The City and the Taxi Driver"
2002	Don't Blame Me	Nigel	"Liar Liar"
2003	White Collar Blue	Karl Baumann	"1.18"
2004–2006	Gilmore Girls	Finn	Recurring role
2007	CSI: Miami	Jason Billings	"Kill Switch"
2007	CSI: NY	Zamir Duka	"The Deep"
2008	90210	Tom Moreno	"Model Behavior"
2008	The Strip	Terry McCready	"Stolen Yacht"
2010	The Mentalist	Ed Harrington	"Red All Over"
2012	Body of Proof	Teddy Gorman	"Occupational Hazards"
2014	Sons of Anarchy	Gib White	"Toil and Till"
2014	Matador	Alec Holester	13 episodes, main role
2015	Childhood's End	Jerry Hallcross	"The Children"
2016	Gilmore Girls: A Year in the Life	Finn	"Fall"
2016	Roadies	Christopher House	8 episodes
2016	Lethal Weapon	Julian	"The Ties That Bind"
2018	Deception	Lance Bauer	Recurring
2018	The Resident	Josh Robinson	"About Time"
2023	1923	Father Cillian	3 episodes
2026	The Madison	Dallas Reece	1 episode
