= Sex and Death 101 =

2007 black comedy science fiction film by Daniel Waters

- Theatrical release poster
- Directed by: Daniel Waters
- Written by: Daniel Waters
- Produced by: Cary Brokaw
- Starring: Simon Baker; Winona Ryder; Leslie Bibb; Tanc Sade; Patton Oswalt; Retta; Sophie Monk
- Cinematography: Daryn Okada
- Edited by: Trudy Ship
- Music by: Rolfe Kent
- Distributed by: Anchor Bay Entertainment
- Release dates: June 15, 2007 (SIFF); February 22, 2008 (US)
- Running time: 100 minutes
- Country: United States
- Language: English
- Box office: $1.2 million

Sex and Death 101 is a 2007 science fiction black comedy film written and directed by Daniel Waters, released in the United States on April 4, 2008. The film marks the reunion of writer/director Daniel Waters and Winona Ryder, who previously worked on the 1989 film Heathers, written by Waters.

== Plot ==
Roderick Blank is a successful corporate executive for a fast-food restaurant chain and is engaged to be married. On the day of his bachelor party, he receives an anonymous email containing a chronological list of 101 women he has a sexual relationship with. Finding his fiancée listed as number 29, he initially suspects his friends Zack and Lester of playing a prank, until he meets his 30th partner, Carlotta Valdez, a stripper at his bachelor party.

After sleeping with Carlotta, he realizes the list does, in fact, comprise all of his sexual partners both in the past and the future. This is confirmed by a mysterious trio named Alpha, Beta and Fred from a group called the Agency, who tell him the list was mistakenly emailed to him. It originates, they say, from a machine that the Agency has which predicts the future. Alpha, the leader, urges Roderick not to tell anyone since it could cause unrest. He also warns him to destroy the list since it could ruin his life, but Roderick ignores this at first.

Roderick cancels his upcoming wedding and begins to sequentially bed all the people on the list, feeling compelled to continue until he has crossed all names off the list. His friends become concerned for his mental well-being and convince him to bury the list. Before he does that, he sees only part of the next name, including "Dr." and the first few letters.

A female vigilante, nicknamed by the media "Death Nell", has been taking revenge on men who she feels have taken sexual advantage of women. She seduces them and then drugs them to induce a coma, leaving them behind along with a line of feminist poetry spray painted on the wall or ceiling. After her most recent conquest, she accidentally leaves behind her driver license, exposing her real identity, Gillian De Raisx, to the world. Roderick's precarious mental state is compromised when he realizes the last name on his list is Gillian's.

With twenty more names left on the list, he decides to abandon it altogether and takes up various hobbies to keep him from giving in to temptation. After an accident during a bike ride, he is found by a group of female students from a Catholic college who believe that he has been "divinely delivered" to deflower them. The students rape Roderick in his injured state, catapulting himself to number 100 in the space of a single day. Knowing that Death Nell is the last person on his list (and that he may not survive a night with her), Roderick tries to change his destiny, but when he learns that the Agency is close to catching Death Nell, he has a sudden change of heart. Guilt-stricken over his treatment of his previous conquests, he decides to face the consequences.

Roderick and Gillian meet in a diner, where they share a meal and conversation. Gillian reveals that she was a poetry/chemistry student who married young and was forced to perform degrading sexual favors for her husband, who also physically abused her. After his death, which was inadvertently caused by Gillian, she realized that she could dish out similar punishments to other men who treated women badly; but she is now exhausted from the whole ordeal and unsure if she wants to continue. Roderick and Gillian connect. They take the coma pills simultaneously and spend the night together, with "The End" spray painted on the wall behind them.

The epilogue reveals that Roderick and Gillian survived the pills, and that Gillian's name was not the last on the list because of impending death but rather because Roderick decides to remain monogamous with her. They are happily married and have a son. Death Nell's comatose victims are revived, and a brief scene at the Agency suggests that Roderick and Gillian's union was fated.

== Cast ==
- Simon Baker as Roderick Blank
- Winona Ryder as Gillian De Raisx/Death Nell
- Leslie Bibb as Dr. Miranda Storm
- Mindy Cohn as Trixie
- Julie Bowen as Fiona Wormwood
- Dash Mihok as Lester
- Neil Flynn as Zack
- Robert Wisdom as Alpha
- Tanc Sade as Beta
- Patton Oswalt as Fred
- Frances Fisher as Hope Hartlight
- Sophie Monk as Cynthia Rose
- Marshall Bell as Victor Rose III
- Natassia Malthe as Bambi Kidd
- Pollyanna McIntosh as Thumper Wind
- Rob Benedict as Bow Tie Bob
- Jessica Kiper as Precious/Carlotta Valdes
- Winter Ave Zoli as Alexis
- Cindy Pickett as Roderick's Mother
- Nicole Bilderback as Dr. Mirabella Stone
- Keram Malicki-Sánchez as Master Bitchslap
- Retta as Ethel (as Retta Sirleaf)
- Corinne Reilly as Lizzie
- Amanda Walsh as Stewardess Kathleen
- Zachary Gordon as Barbecue Brat
- Indira Varma as Deven Sovor (uncredited)

== Reception ==
=== Critical response ===
On the review aggregator website Rotten Tomatoes, 25% of 40 critics' reviews are positive, with an average rating of 4.2/10. The website's consensus reads: "Sex and Death 101 aspires to be a clever sex comedy, but has little life behind the sex or the death." Metacritic, which uses a weighted average, assigned the film a score of 24 out of 100, based on 12 critics, indicating "generally unfavorable" reviews.

Manohla Dargis of The New York Times dismissed it as an "unfortunate comedy".

=== Box office ===
Sex and Death 101 grossed under $24,000 domestically (United States and Canada), and $1.2 million in other territories, for a worldwide total of $1.2 million.

== Awards ==
The film won the Golden Space Needle Award for Best Director at the 33rd Seattle International Film Festival.
