= Anontune =

Cyberattack

Anontune was a proposal for a "fault-tolerant and open platform for social music" from Anonymous. Its beta implementation allowed users to create playlists of song titles which were playable through Anontune's music engine. Since the music engine worked by searching other networks like YouTube these playlists could then be shared without sharing any actual music. Thus Anontune's music engine was more like a client-side metasearch engine than any previous systems. Anonymous hoped that this would make the platform immune from copyright infringement lawsuits by never directly hosting or linking to copyrighted music or allowing it to be downloaded.

== Aims ==
In a white paper titled "A Fault-tolerant and Open Platform for Social Music (Version 2)" Anonymous outlined their aims for the Anontune project:

- Allow open access to the platform and its information for developers, researchers, users, artists, and labels.
- Provide legal indemnity and anonymity from prosecution for users.
- Create a music engine for flexible, dynamic, redundant, and fault-tolerant organization of music networks.
- Improve musical listening experiences.
- Create a social environment and model for sharing and discovering music.
- Support and contribute to experimentation and innovation around music.
- Allow artists, labels, and associated parties to earn money from their content.

The concept of openness here was a pervading theme for Anontune. The source code for Anontune is open source under the AGPL license, there were no restrictions on developer API usage, the platform was open to use by anyone, and the music itself was to be open. Anonymous viewed this as a key difference from other music services stating that [such services] employ geographic restrictions and provide only partial music catalogs.

== Stance on piracy ==
A video posted on the website stated that Anontune would never host or encourage the downloading of copyrighted music but would instead provide information about music. The video stated that this was a new paradigm for music sharing, and would allow the music which exists on the Internet to be played from a single platform. The video also stated that Anontune itself, as distinguished from copyright questions about the music, would be legal. Users of the service would be able to remain largely anonymous.

== Technology ==
Anontune's music engine worked by consulting multiple components called "routes." Each route described a way to search, filter, play, and optionally download music from a specific place on the Internet. A route for YouTube would allow results from YouTube to be played in a web browser. The music engine was designed to be as flexible as possible and its finished version was to allow users to extend it by adding arbitrary routes thereby increasing the music they have access to.

Because of limitations in the web Anonymous claim they had to develop new technology allowing sockets to be used from the music engine. This technology would have required contributors to run a Java applet. Such technology was in development, but said to have been already functional.

News reports warned potential users that they would need to trust Anonymous to use the service, because the website would require the Java applet to run with full permissions. Anonymous responded in a Pastebin post that the Java applet is no longer used, that any Java used would be open source, that it wouldn't be strictly required, and that it would be against their interests to harm their users.

A prototype went online in the early hours of April 21, 2012.

== Legal issues ==
Anonymous stated that the law was on their side in the creation of Anontune, and that one object of Anontune was to break down the copyright industry's monopoly without fighting them in court. Anonymous said that they had learned from the experiences of previous entities such as Napster and LimeWire. Anontune attempted to avoid legal problems by never hosting links to copyrighted content. Users would be able to avoid lawsuits as well, since the media is played in the browser rather than downloaded to a user's hard drive. Since Anontune merely allowed users to centralize their experience of other music sources, legal complaints would have had to be addressed to the original sources of the content such as YouTube.

== Closure ==
Anontune closed on 5 January 2014. The anontune.com domain forwards to a posting on Pastebin which states that "the executive decision to pull the plug" on the project had been made. The anonymous poster wrote that, "the Anontune we released is nothing like how we envisioned the project. Our users deserve more than what we've achieved—which is an ugly, incomplete application with largely unproven ideas."

== See also ==
- File sharing
- Privacy in file sharing networks
- Trade group efforts against file sharing
- Open Music Model
