= The Director's Chair =

American television talk show

The Director's Chair is an American talk show created and hosted by filmmaker Robert Rodriguez. It premiered on May 10, 2014, on El Rey and features Rodriguez interviewing other filmmakers about their filmmaking techniques and their careers.

== Episodes ==
| No. overall | No. in season | Title | Directed by | Original release date |
|---|---|---|---|---|
| 1 | 1 | "John Carpenter" | Robert Rodriguez | May 10, 2014 |
Rodriguez and John Carpenter discuss many of Carpenter's films including Assault on Precinct 13, Halloween, The Fog, Escape from New York, The Thing, Big Trouble in Little China, and They Live. They also discuss such influences as John Ford, Roger Corman, and Howard Hawks and Rodriguez later asks Carpenter questions submitted by directors Greg Nicotero, Edgar Wright, and Eli Roth.
| 2 | 2 | "Guillermo del Toro" | Robert Rodriguez | July 8, 2014 |
Rodriguez and director Guillermo del Toro discuss del Toro's films, including Cronos, Mimic, The Devil's Backbone, Blade II, Hellboy, Pan's Labyrinth, and Pacific Rim, as well as the television series The Strain. del Toro also answers questions submitted by directors J. J. Abrams, John Landis, and Francis Ford Coppola.
| 3 | 3 | "Quentin Tarantino Vol. 1" | Robert Rodriguez | August 14, 2014 |
Rodriguez and Quentin Tarantino discuss the films Reservoir Dogs and Pulp Fiction, the screenwriting process, the effect Tarantino's films had on the film industry in the 1990s and the early years of their friendship.
| 4 | 4 | "Quentin Tarantino Vol. II" | Robert Rodriguez | September 17, 2014 |
Rodriguez and Tarantino discuss Rolling Thunder Pictures and Tarantino's films Jackie Brown, Kill Bill: Volume 1, Kill Bill: Volume 2, Inglourious Basterds, and Django Unchained, as well as their collaborative effort Grindhouse. Tarantino also answers questions submitted by directors Joe Dante, Guillermo del Toro, Edgar Wright, Francis Ford Coppola, and Peter Bogdanovich.
| 5 | 5 | "Francis Ford Coppola" | Robert Rodriguez | March 2, 2015 |
Rodriguez and Coppola discuss The Godfather, The Godfather Part II, The Conversation, Apocalypse Now, One from the Heart, The Outsiders, Rumble Fish, The Cotton Club, and Bram Stoker's Dracula. Coppola also answers questions submitted by directors Frank Darabont and Jon Favreau.
| 6 | 6 | "Luis Valdez" | Robert Rodriguez | March 29, 2015 |
Rodriguez and Valdez discuss Valdez's work in theater as well as his films such as Zoot Suit, The Cisco Kid, and La Bamba. Valdez also answers questions submitted by directors Joe Menendez, Eduardo Sanchez, and Guillermo del Toro.
| 7 | 7 | "Robert Zemeckis" | Robert Rodriguez | May 2015 |
Rodriguez and Zemeckis discuss the films Romancing the Stone, Back to the Future, Who Framed Roger Rabbit, Forrest Gump, Contact, Cast Away, The Polar Express, Flight, and The Walk as well as the influence of technology on the art of cinema.
| 8 | 8 | "Michael Mann" | Robert Rodriguez | June 2015 |
Robert Rodriguez interviews Michael Mann.
| 9 | 9 | "George Miller" | Robert Rodriguez | August 30, 2015 |
In the first part of the episode, Rodriguez and Miller discuss Mad Max, Mad Max 2, Miller's segment of Twilight Zone: The Movie, Mad Max Beyond Thunderdome, The Witches of Eastwick, Lorenzo's Oil, Babe: Pig in the City, and Happy Feet. In the second part, Rodriguez catches up with Miller again after a screening of Mad Max: Fury Road, which he had not yet seen when the first segment was filmed.
| 10 | 10 | "Sylvester Stallone" | Robert Rodriguez | November 15, 2015 |
Robert Rodriguez interviews director Sylvester Stallone to discuss Sly's beginnings and inspirations, what it's like to write, direct and star in an action film and his return to directing with Rocky Balboa, Rambo, and The Expendables.
| 11 | 11 | "Jon Favreau" | Robert Rodriguez | September 25, 2016 |
Robert Rodriguez interviews Jon Favreau.
| 12 | 12 | "Frank Darabont" | Robert Rodriguez | September 25, 2016 |
Robert Rodriguez interviews Frank Darabont.
| 13 | 13 | "Barbra Streisand" | Robert Rodriguez | November 26, 2018 |
Robert Rodriguez interviews Barbra Streisand.

== See also ==
- Academy Award for Best Director
- Academy Award for Best Picture
