= Marc Geiger =

American music industry executive and entrepreneur

- Born: Marc Paul Geiger; October 11, 1962 (age 64); Englewood, New Jersey
- Education: University of California, San Diego
- Occupations: Music industry executive Entrepreneur
- Years active: 1980–present
- Awards: Billboard Power 100 (2012-2020)
- Website: savelive.com

Marc Geiger is an American music executive and entrepreneur. He is the CEO and co-founder of Gate 52, formerly known as SAVELIVE, a platform created in 2020 to help live music venues recover from the impact of the COVID-19 pandemic.

Geiger co-founded Lollapalooza and ARTISTdirect. He was the global head of the William Morris Endeavor Music Division from 2003 until 2020.

== Early life and education ==
Geiger was born in Englewood, New Jersey, and grew up in Stamford, Connecticut. He moved with his family to Palo Alto, California after his father, a Budapest, Hungary-born Holocaust survivor, accepted a job as a satellite communication engineer in Silicon Valley.

Geiger attended the University of California, San Diego; while a student, he started a co-operative record store called "Assorted Vinyl", selling 12-inch dance remixes from bands like Echo & the Bunnymen and Japan, while also running the Student Events Committee. After promoting a series of concerts on campus, Geiger started his own concert promotion company, That Kid Presents.

After booking King Crimson, B.B. King and Ian Hunter, amongst others, at UCSD, Geiger began working for San Diego promoter Mark Berman Attractions/Avalon Attractions. While there, Geiger promoted hundreds of shows in San Diego, and founded and launched Humphrey's By The Bay, a popular local venue. Additionally, Geiger dj'd at 91X, a groundbreaking alternative radio station.

== Career ==
=== Triad Artists, William Morris Agency, Lollapalooza ===
With a degree in management science and biology, Geiger moved to Los Angeles after college and began working as a booking agent for Regency Artists, developing their alternative music division. (Regency merged with Triad Artists Agency, and was later folded into the William Morris Agency.) Geiger spent 7 years at Triad, booking such artists as the Pixies, the Smiths, the Cocteau Twins, New Order, and Jane's Addiction. He would go on to create the Lollapalooza Festival with Jane's Perry Farrell and veteran agent Don Muller. In its inaugural year, 1991, USA Today wrote that Lollapalooza "revolutionized the concert industry, ushered in the alternative rock format, and galvanized a previously marginalized generation of outsiders."

=== American Recordings, ARTISTdirect ===
In 1991, Geiger left Triad to join Rick Rubin's American Recordings as Executive Vice President of A&R, Marketing and New Media. During his tenure at American, Rubin and Geiger bought UBL.com, one of the first online music directories, from a Caltech student. Geiger left American Recordings in 1996 to create ARTISTdirect with Muller; the company launched in January 1997 with the premise that "the Internet was going to radically reshape the music business, both from a distribution perspective as well as create new revenue streams that hadn't existed before."

Geiger served as CEO and Vice Chairman of ARTISTdirect until 2003. During his tenure, ARTISTdirect signed more than 130 recording artists to e-commerce agreements, and became one of the most highly trafficked music sites on the Web. ARTISTdirect also included a booking agency and two record labels.

ARTISTdirect is credited as the first internet company designed to create a direct connection between musicians and fans. The company went public in March 2000, one week prior to the stock market crash of 2000.

=== William Morris Agency, WME ===
Geiger left ARTISTdirect in 2003 to join The William Morris Agency as a Senior Vice President in the music division. After William Morris merged with Endeavor to become WME, Geiger was named the head of the music division, overseeing the agency's worldwide music business, and representing artists including David Byrne, Neil Diamond, Jane's Addiction, LCD Soundsystem, Steve Martin, Nine Inch Nails, The The and Tom Petty. During his tenure, the WME music division became a "global powerhouse", with Geiger playing a significant role in expanding the international festival business into a multi-billion dollar industry. Geiger left WME in June 2020; it was rumored that he would take on a senior role at Spotify.

=== SAVELIVE/Gate 52 ===
In 2020, Geiger founded SAVELIVE, an initiative to offset the economic impact of the Coronavirus pandemic on live music venues. SAVELIVE secured $75 million in investment capital to acquire at least 51% equity in the venues, helping them to expand after the pandemic, and bringing them together to create an independent touring network. During a keynote speech at the Interactive Festival Forum in September 2020, Geiger said he did not expect the live music sector to recover until 2022, but that it would then “give way to a second Roaring Twenties, 100 years later.” Geiger founded SAVELIVE with John Fogelman, who worked with Geiger for more than a decade as a partner at William Morris. SAVELIVE was rebranded as Gate 52 in March 2025.

In 2023, the original owners of the Alibi, a 200-capacity live music venue in Palm Springs, California, sued Geiger and SAVELIVE for breach of contract, interference, and fraud.

== Selected awards and acknowledgements ==
- Billboard Touring Power Players (2024)
- Keynote address, MIDEM (2014)
- Billboard Power 100 (2012, 2013, 2014, 2015, 2016, 2017, 2018, 2019, 2020)
- Keynote address, International Music Summit, (2013)
- Pollstar Agent of the Year/Bobby Brooks Award (2006, 2007, 2010)
