= MediaDefender =

Defunct anti-infringement company

MediaDefender, Inc.
- Formerly: Peer Media Technologies
- Type: Private
- Industry: Digital media; anti-piracy; copyright enforcement
- Founder: Randy Saaf
- Headquarters: Los Angeles, California, U.S.
- Area served: Worldwide
- Key people: Randy Saaf (CEO)
- Products: Anti-piracy tools; decoy file distribution systems
- Services: Copyright enforcement; P2P network monitoring
- Owner: ARTISTdirect
- Number of employees: ~60 (2007)

MediaDefender, Inc. (now Peer Media Technologies) was a company that fought copyright infringement that offered services designed to prevent alleged copyright infringement using peer-to-peer distribution. They used unusual tactics such as flooding peer-to-peer networks with decoy files that tie up users' computers and bandwidth. MediaDefender was based in Los Angeles, California in the United States. As of March 2007, the company had approximately 60 employees and used 2,000 servers hosted in California with contracts for 9 Gbit/s of bandwidth.

These types of organizations are being hired to attempt to stymie peer-to-peer (P2P) traders through a variety of methods including posting fake files online and recording individuals who contribute copyrighted material, but also marketing to individuals using P2P networks. Clients include Universal Pictures, 20th Century Fox, Virgin Records, HBO, Paramount Pictures, and BMG. On August 1, 2005, the digital media entertainment company ARTISTdirect announced that it had acquired MediaDefender for $42.5 million in cash.

In May 2008, MediaDefender performed a distributed-denial-of-service attack on Revision3, despite the fact that they were not hosting unauthorized materials. Jim Louderback, Revision3's CEO, charged that these attacks violated the Economic Espionage Act and the Computer Fraud and Abuse Act. As of May 2008, the Federal Bureau of Investigation was investigating the incident.

In August 2009, ARTISTdirect restructured MediaDefender and MediaSentry, creating Peer Media Technologies.

== Miivi.com ==
In February 2007, MediaDefender launched a video sharing site called Miivi.com. On July 4, 2007, file-sharing news site TorrentFreak alleged that Miivi.com was created to trap uploaders of copyrighted content. The site's origins were discovered by a blogger who looked up Miivi.com domain registration information.

After the allegation was re-posted throughout the blogosphere, Miivi.com was shut down on July 4, 2007. In an interview with Ars Technica, chief executive Randy Saaf stated that "MediaDefender was working on an internal project that involved video and didn't realize that people would be trying to go to it and so we didn't password-protect the site". MediaDefender blamed file-sharing groups such as The Pirate Bay for starting the story. Following MediaDefender's subsequent email leak, TorrentFreak alleged that MediaDefender's statement was revealed to be a deliberate falsehood. Saaf denied that MiiVi was "a devious product" and that the company aimed to entrap users, stating only that it was part of MediaDefender's "trade secrets."

The MPAA denied any involvement with MediaDefender. On September 14, 2007, internal emails from MediaDefender were leaked on to BitTorrent file sharing networks, which contradicted MediaDefender's claims of MiiVi being an "internal test site," revealing additional detailed information about the website and that the site was closed when the connection between it and MediaDefender became public knowledge. It was scheduled to be re-launched as www.viide.com, but has not yet been opened up to the public.

== Leaked information ==
Beginning on September 14, 2007, MediaDefender experienced a security breach caused by a group of hackers led by high school student "Ethan". This group called themselves MediaDefender-Defenders. According to an SEC filing, this ultimately cost parent company ARTISTdirect at least $825,000. The breach included emails, a phone conversation, and a number of internal anti-infringement tools, including some source code.

=== Leaked e-mails ===
On September 14, 2007, 6,621 of the company's internal e-mails were leaked, containing information contradicting previous statements and details of strategies intended to deceive copyright infringers. The emails link MediaDefender to projects that management previously denied involvement in. The Associated Press and other media outlets suggest that the leak may confirm speculation that MiiVi.com was an anti-copyright infringement "honeypot" site. One e-mail suggests using the MiiVi client program to turn users' PCs into drones for MediaDefender's eMule spoofing activities. The leaked e-mails discuss responses to unexpected and negative press, and expose upcoming projects, problems in and around the office, Domino's pizza orders, and other personal information about employees. Beyond strategic information, the leak also exposed login information for FTP and MySQL servers, making available a large library of MP3 files likely including artists represented by MediaDefender's clients. The emails also revealed that MediaDefender probably was negotiating with the New York Attorney General's office to allow them access to information about users accessing pornographic material. As of September 15, 2007, there had been no official response from the company. However, evidence exists that MediaDefender had been employing both legal and illegal actions to remove copies of the leaked emails from their respective hosting sites. In addition to the usual cease-and-desist letters from their legal department, IP addresses that are owned by MediaDefender were found to have been used in denial-of-service attacks against sites hosting the leaked emails.

The e-mails also revealed direction by MediaDefender founder Randy Saaf to have developer Ben Ebert attempt to eliminate the information about MiiVi from MediaDefender's English Wikipedia entry. Ebert responds in an email on the same day saying, "I will attempt to get all References [sic] to miivi removed from wiki. I should easily be able to get It contested. We'll see if I can get rid of it."

=== Leaked phone conversation ===
On September 16, 2007, MediaDefender-Defenders released a 25-minute excerpt of a phone conversation between the New York Attorney General's office and MediaDefender as a torrent on The Pirate Bay. MediaDefender-Defenders claims in information released with the phone conversation that they have infiltrated the "internals" of the company.

=== Leaked source code ===
On September 20, 2007, MediaDefender-Defenders released the source code of TrapperKeeper, MediaDefender's decoy systems on The Pirate Bay. A large chunk of MediaDefender's software was available by Bittorrent.

== Revision3 controversy ==
Revision3 is an Internet television network which distributes video content legally through various means, including the BitTorrent protocol. During the Memorial Day weekend in 2008, Revision3 came under a Denial of Service attack originating from MediaDefender IP addresses. The attack left the company's service inaccessible until mid-Tuesday the following week. Revision3 CEO Jim Louderback accused MediaDefender of injecting its decoy files into Revision3's BitTorrent service through a vulnerability, then automatically perpetrating the attack after Revision3 increased security.

Randy Saaf defended MediaDefender's actions by stating "Our systems were targeting a tracker not even knowing it was Revision3's tracker", adding that the denial-of-service attack resulted when "Revision3 changed some configurations" to their BitTorrent tracker.

== See also ==
- Copyright social conflict
- Cyberterrorism
- BayTSP
- Streisand effect
- Torrent poisoning
