= Peer Media Technologies =

Merger of MediaDefender and MediaSentry

Peer Media Technologies, Inc.
- Predecessor: MediaDefender and MediaSentry
- Founded: 2009
- Parent: Artistdirect
- Website: www.peermediatech.com

Peer Media Technologies, Inc. is an Artistdirect subsidiary created in 2009 as a merger of MediaDefender and MediaSentry, after the reputations of the predecessor companies were sullied by the exposure of internal emails and the use of investigative tactics deemed illegal in several U.S. states.

The Company's media segment and e-commerce segment accounted for 36% and 3% of its revenue during the year ended December 31, 2008. The IPP segment accounted for approximately 64% of the Company’s revenue during 2008.

According to Peer Media Technologies, they cover the following P2P networks and file sharing protocols: Ares, BitTorrent, Direct Connect, eDonkey, Gnutella, Piolet, Shareaza, SoulSeek and WinMX.

In March 2011, Peer Media Technologies, Inc. and Bay TSP.com, Inc., digital media technology companies, announced they had signed a non-binding letter of intent conditional on various pre-conditions to merge by May 31, 2011. The announcement was made by Dimitri Villard, CEO of Peer Media Technologies, and Stuart Rosove, CEO of Bay TSP.

The firm's website has been defunct since May 2013.
