= El Rey Network =

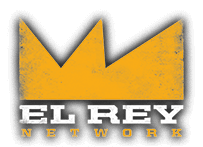
- Country: United States
- Broadcast area: Nationwide
- Headquarters: Austin, Texas; 274 Fox West Street; Glendale, California

Programming
- Language: English
- Picture format: 1080i (HDTV); (HD feed downgraded to letterboxed 480i for SDTVs)

Ownership
- Owner: Robert Rodriguez; FactoryMade Ventures

History
- Launched: December 15, 2013; 12 years ago (As a television outlet); August 17, 2021; 5 years ago (As a streaming channel)
- Closed: December 31, 2020; 5 years ago (As a television outlet)

Links
- Website: www.elreynetwork.com

El Rey Network (Spanish for The King) is a media brand founded by Robert Rodriguez on December 15, 2013, that is currently owned in a joint venture with FactoryMade Ventures.

Until December 31, 2020, El Rey was a cable and satellite network, operated and distributed in-partnership with Univision Communications (now known as TelevisaUnivision), dedicated to exploitation-style programming targeting English-speaking Hispanic audiences. By March 2015, approximately 40 million households received El Rey; its carriage would fall to 13 million households by the time of the network's closure.

== History ==
=== As a television network (2013–2020) ===
El Rey Network was one of two ethnic outlets created as part of an agreement between Comcast, NBC Universal, and the FCC as a condition for the merger between the former two broadcasters (the other network being Revolt).

The network's headquarters was in Austin, Texas, and launched as part of the digital basic service on some of Comcast's systems. Comcast announced that the network was expected to debut by January 2014. In August 2012, Antoinette Alfonso Zel was announced as CEO. In May 2013, Univision Communications (now known as TelevisaUnivision USA) announced that it would be an investor for El Rey, handling the sales and distribution of the network.

In November 2013, it was announced that the production of From Dusk till Dawn: The Series had begun. Upon launch in the week of December 15, 2013, El Rey was also offered by cable companies Time Warner Cable, with Bright House Networks offering soon later in January 2014, and Cox Communications by February 2014. Cablevision added the network on April 7, 2014.

The first satellite service to host El Rey was DirecTV in January 2014.

That year, lucha libre program Lucha Underground, featuring wrestlers from Lucha Libre AAA World Wide (AAA) and produced by Mark Burnett, premiered on October 29, 2014. The show would go on to become the network's flagship series and both it, and the corresponding promotion, received positive reception.

Dish Network would begin carrying El Rey in January 2015. The following month, El Rey was made available through cable company Suddenlink Communications in select markets. El Rey was added to AT&T U-verse and Verizon FiOS that same year.

Between 2018 and 2020, various cable and satellite providers began dropping the network. On November 6, 2020, Univision announced it had sold its stake in El Rey, as part of a larger effort by the company to refocus on its core Spanish-language businesses. Soon after, it would be reported that El Rey would cease operations on December 31, though it was speculated that the network would relaunch as a streaming brand. The network went dark at 11:59 p.m. Pacific.

=== As a streaming network (2021–present) ===
On August 6, 2021, El Rey Network announced a partnership with Cinedigm that would see the network relaunch as a FAST channel. As part of this agreement, Cinedigm will exclusively distribute Rodriguez's 2019 film, Red 11, and a companion docuseries titled Rebel Without a Crew: The Robert Rodriguez Film School. El Rey would relaunch later that month via The Roku Channel on August 17.

By 2024, Fuse Media would partner with El Rey to launch the "El Rey Rebel" FAST channel; which would air the network's original content, and carry combat sports programming as part Fuse's partnerships with Golden Boy Promotions and Combate Global. In June 2024, El Rey Rebel would begin distribution on DirecTV.

== Programming ==
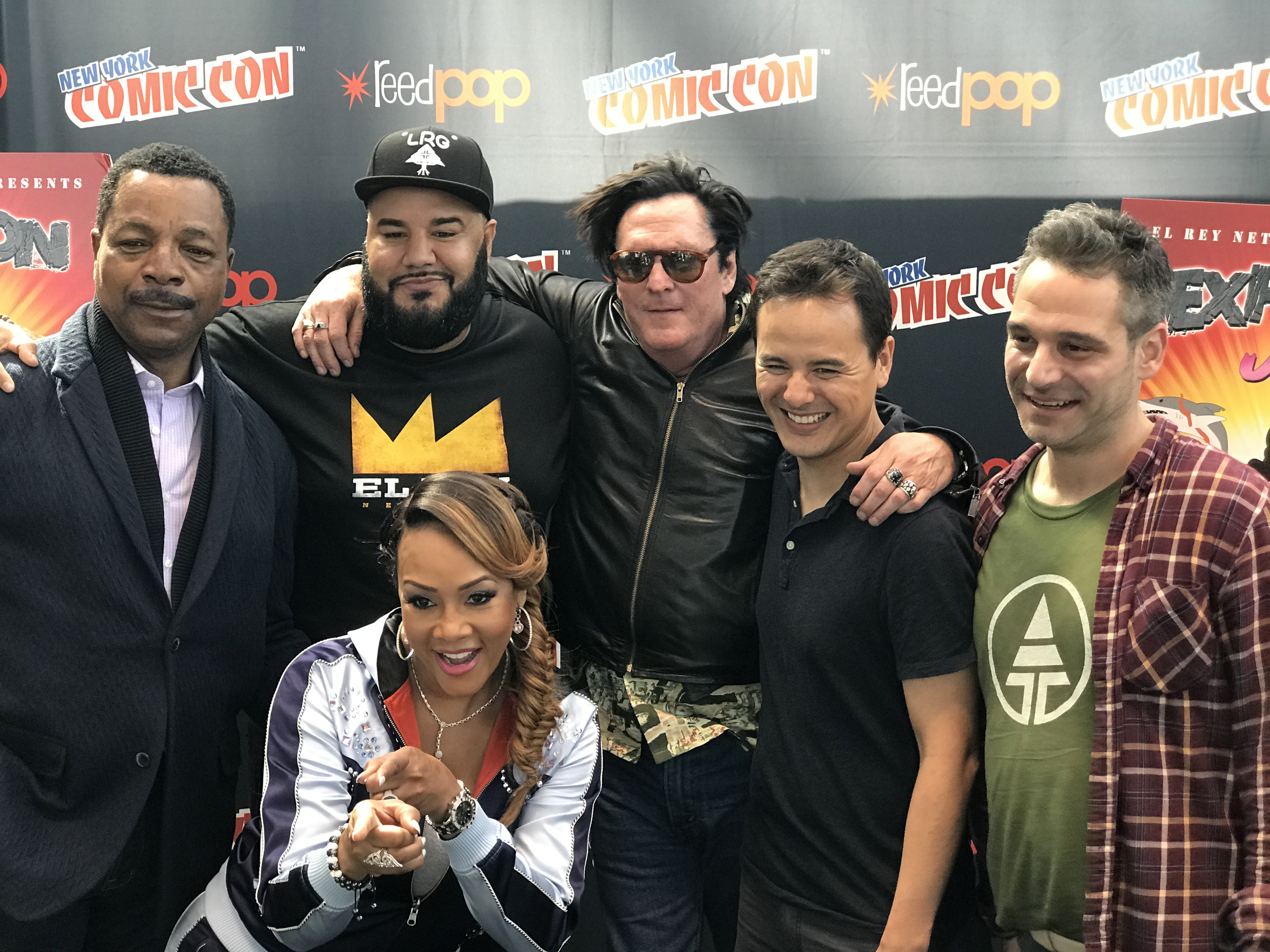
El Rey correspondent Chuey Martinez (in the hat) posing with the cast and crew of Explosion Jones at the 2017 New York Comic Con

El Rey Network's original programming included action genre series, sports, and lifestyle programming. Annual programming included a marathon of Toho-produced Godzilla films during the Christmas & Independence Day weekends and the Thanksgiving Way of the Turkey marathon of kung fu films.

=== Original programming ===
- Baja Desert Championship (2017–2020)
- Bushido Battleground (2017)
- The Chuey Martinez Show (2019–2020)
- Correctamundo! (2020)
- Cutting Crew
- The Director's Chair with Robert Rodriguez (2014–2020)
- El Rey Nation (2019–2020)
- Explosion Jones, starring Michael Madsen
- From Dusk till Dawn: The Series (2014–2016)
- Lucha Underground (2014–2018)
- Man at Arms: Art of War (2017–2020)
- ¡MARIA! with Maria Cardona (2020)
- Matador (2014)
- Rebel Without a Crew: The Series (2018)
- Rite of Passage (2017)
- United Tacos of America (2019–2020)
- Vampiro: Unleashed (2020)

=== Acquired programming ===
- 19-2
- Airwolf
- Alien Nation
- Almost Human
- Biker Mice from Mars
- Clerks: The Animated Series
- Cold Squad
- Constantine
- Core Culture
- Crunch Time
- Day 5
- Demons
- Flatland
- Freddy's Nightmares
- Happy Tree Friends (Season 3-4)
- Human Target
- I Am the Greatest: The Adventures of Muhammad Ali
- Incredible Hulk
- Kidnapped
- Knight Rider
- Mercy Point
- Miami Vice
- Mondo Animation Hour
- Night Visions
- Pros vs. Joes
- Quantum Leap
- Red vs. Blue
- Relic Hunter
- Texas Justice
- Toxic Crusaders
- Stargate Atlantis
- Stargate SG-1
- Starhunter: ReduX
- Starsky and Hutch
- The A-Team
- The Twilight Zone
- The X-Files
- V
- Xena: Warrior Princess

=== Film releases ===
- Crow's Blood
- Kung Fury
- The People's Network Showcase
- Red 11

== See also ==
- Robert Rodriguez
- Corey Burton, Continuity announcer.
