= MediaSentry =

- Industry: Network monitoring for copyright enforcement
- Founded: 2001
- Defunct: 2009
- Successor: Peer Media Technologies
- Headquarters: New York City, New York, United States
- Parent: SafeNet (2005-2009); Artistdirect (2009-)
- Website: www.mediasentry.com

MediaSentry was a United States company that provided services to the music recording, motion picture, television, and software industries for locating and identifying IP addresses that are engaged in the use of online networks to share material in a manner said organizations claim is in violation of copyright. Their most notable customers were several trade associations including the Motion Picture Association of America and International Federation of the Phonographic Industry.

The company provided several services for this purpose, such as monitoring popular forums for copyright infringement, aid in litigation, early leak detection, and the distribution of decoy files. MediaSentry also monitored auction sites such as eBay for unauthorized distribution of software and other property.

== History ==
On 1 February 2001 MediaSentry was founded by Aaron Fessler in Morristown, New Jersey.

On 13 June 2005 MediaSentry was acquired by SafeNet. SafeNet sold the MediaSentry division to Artistdirect in April 2009.

In late 2007 the University of Oregon, represented by Oregon Attorney General Hardy Myers, refused to provide information on its students to the RIAA, questioning the tactics used by MediaSentry in one of its investigations. The next year Central Michigan University accused MediaSentry of violating its students' privacy after the company ignored a ruling that it was illegally operating without a private investigator's license.

In January 2009 the RIAA canceled their usage of MediaSentry for undisclosed reasons.

In August 2009, ARTISTdirect restructured MediaDefender and MediaSentry, creating Peer Media Technologies.

== See also ==
- MediaDefender
- MarkMonitor
