= Viralg =

Viralg is a Finnish company, which won the 2003-2004 Venture Cup with their business plan for anti file sharing technologies. In April 2005 they claimed to be able to stop 99% of illegal file sharing. Their web site stated that their technique was enabled by use of an in-house developed virtual algorithm. Virtual algorithm is not a commonly known concept in computer science, Viralg being the only entity that may actually know what it is. The company name Viralg, also works as an abbreviation for virtual algorithm. In 2007 Viralg offered some of their intellectual property for sale on eBay.

== Legal Inspection ==
The police were asked to investigate Viralg, since Finnish law prohibits interfering with telecommunications. The police, however, declined, stating that there was no cause to suspect a crime. In a complaint to the Finnish parliamentary ombudsman the ombudsman concluded that the police officer in charge of the investigation did not, by his own admission, have relevant technical expertise, and that a proper inquiry would have been more appropriate. However, the ombudsman also stated that the decision was a proper judgement call by the police.
