= Artistdirect =

Online digital media entertainment company

ARTISTdirect
- Founded: 1994; 32 years ago in Encino, California
- Founder: Marc Geiger, Keith Yokomoto, Steve Rennie, Don Muller
- Headquarters: Santa Monica, California, United States
- Key people: James Graf (CEO); Augustine Wong (President)
- Website: Artistdirect.com

Artistdirect (stylized as ARTISTdirect) was an American online digital media entertainment company.

== Overview ==
Founded in 1996, it owns several websites, including artistdirect.com and artistdirectinterviews.com. These websites are a group of affiliate websites offering multimedia content, music news and information, communities organized around shared music interests, music-related specialty commerce and digital music services.

Artistdirect began as an online music retailer and distribution company. It hosted the Ultimate Band List (UBL), a database with information on over 600,000 artists, concerts, record labels, and other music-related resources. In 1997, it partnered with the band Blink-182 to create Loserkids.com, an online store and community site for fans of the music and fashion of cutting-edge Alternative rock, punk, metal, and hard rock artists. It featured merchandise from various brands including Hurley, Dickies, and Ben Sherman. In the early 2000s Artistdirect combined the database of the Ultimate Band List and online store with free audio and video streams, music news, album reviews, and movie trailers. In 2000, the company lost $11.2 million in its first quarter as a public firm.

In 2006, Artistdirect re-launched the UBL.com site to focus on independent and unsigned bands, and helping them to be "discovered". According to Media Metrix, the Artistdirect Network averages 12.4 million unique hits.

In 2005 Artistdirect acquired MediaDefender, a company with a 90% share of the market for protecting against online copyright infringement.

In 2009, Artistdirect acquired MediaSentry, another company that focuses on battling online copyright infringement. The company will operate with two divisions, one for its copyright protection products, and another for its music-related web sites.

In August 2009, the company filed a "Form 15" with the United States Securities and Exchange Commission, under which it will "go dark" and cease to make public its financial information. The company shares will also cease trading on the major stock exchanges.

In March 2015, the business of Artistdirect was acquired by PSI Capital, Inc. The company is now defunct.

== iMUSIC ==
In August 2002, Marc Geiger launched his own iMUSIC label as a separate entity to ARTISTdirect Records but still under the Artistdirect umbrella. It also relied on BMG distribution and on Ted Field's ADR marketing and promotion staff.

The basic idea of iMUSIC was to enter into label and distribution partnerships with long established artists (with sizable fan-bases) who no longer had major label deals.

== ARTISTdirect Online Music Awards ==
In 1999, they created the ARTISTdirect Online Music Awards. With 20 categories, the winners were selected by viewers via online. The first ever ceremony was held at House of Blues having performances of No Doubt, Cypress Hill and Chris Isaak among others. Madonna, Eminem, The Beatles and Ricky Martin were among the first winners. The following edition in 2000, had expanded their categories in rock, pop, urban/hip-hop and electronica.

== See also ==
- List of record labels
- Peer Media Technologies
