= John Fogelman =

American entrepreneur

- Born: 1965 (age 60–61); Los Angeles, CA
- Education: University of Southern California, University of California, Los Angeles
- Occupation: Entrepreneur
- Employer(s): CEO, FactoryMade Ventures
- Website: factorymade.com

John Michael Fogelman (born c. 1965) is an American entrepreneur. He is the CEO of FactoryMade Ventures, an entertainment and media incubator. Formerly Executive Vice President and Head of the Motion Picture Department and the Intellectual Property Group at the William Morris Agency (WMA), Fogelman was a principal architect of the merger between William Morris and Endeavor Talent Agency, and served as a founding board member and an agent after the companies merged in 2009. He left William Morris Endeavor in 2011 to found FactoryMade.

== Early life and education ==
Fogelman was born and grew up in Los Angeles. In high school, he worked for his uncle, Louis Fogelman, a co-founder of the retail music chain Wherehouse Entertainment and the founder of Music Plus. Fogelman attended Tulane University and the University of Southern California and graduated with a BS in Accounting. He subsequently earned a CPA in California. He graduated from the UCLA Anderson School of Management with an MBA in 1992. While at UCLA, he and his colleagues created the Disc Lift, a CD-ROM device. After the patent was awarded, Fogelman built IAF Enterprises, a company which provided the infrastructure to market and support the device.

== Career ==
=== William Morris Endeavor ===
Fogelman—who also worked as an auditor at KPMG Peat Marwick—began his agency career at Triad Artists Agency shortly before the company was bought by William Morris. In 1994, after training in WMA's storied mailroom program, he was promoted to a position as a talent agent. Fogelman was named Head of the Motion Picture Talent Department in 2000, and in 2003 was appointed to the WMA Board of Directors. In 2004 he became the Executive Vice President and Head of the Motion Picture Department. Fogelman played a significant role in the 2009 merger of WMA and Endeavor, and was a founding board member for the newly formed company, William Morris Endeavor, where he continued to oversee the Strategic Planning and Development Group.

As an agent, Fogelman represented J. J. Abrams, Michael Bay, Courteney Cox Arquette, Whoopi Goldberg, Kevin Spacey, Salma Hayek and Eric Bana as well as corporate clients including Hasbro and HSN. As one of the first film executives to capitalize on the market for toy-driven feature films, Fogelman helped establish the concept of "toyetic" in movie making. Described as a film which can lend itself to a toy and sell tickets and merchandise, Fogelman was noted for his toyetic work with Hasbro by the Wall Street Journal, who referred to him as "Mr. Potato Head's agent." Fogelman's projects for Hasbro included the packaging and development of the GI Joe series, and Battleship movies, as well as the Transformers films, which generated more than $380 million in revenue for Hasbro's Transformer products in the year following its release. Fogelman's group also created and brokered several Hasbro films for Universal Pictures. Additionally, with Hasbro CEO Brian Goldner, he advised and negotiated the formation of a joint venture between Hasbro and Discovery Communications, and engineered the rebranding of Discovery Kids as The Hub as well as the launch of its website, which featured content built around some of Hasbro's brands. He also helped to build the framework for J.J. Abrams' Bad Robot, Michael Bay's Bay Films and Platinum Dunes.

=== FactoryMade Ventures ===
In March 2011 Fogelman resigned from WME to co-found FactoryMade Ventures with Cristina Patwa, who also resigned from WME, where she was senior vice president and head of strategy and business development. An entertainment and media incubator, FactoryMade focuses on sustainable, minority-led and socially driven companies and content creators.

In December 2013, FactoryMade partnered with Robert Rodriguez to create the El Rey Network, an English language American television channel targeting Latino audiences. Originally financed by Univision Communications, it produces films and documentaries as well as reality, scripted, and animated series; FactoryMade's first scripted series was Rodriguez' From Dusk till Dawn: The Series. FactoryMade also produced the wrestling series Lucha Underground, in partnership with MGM and the leading Mexican wrestling league, Lucha Libre AAA Worldwide, in which FactoryMade invested. In November 2020, FactoryMade and Rodriguez bought out Univision's minority position, allowing El Rey to be 100% independently owned.

In addition to other companies, as of March 2020, FactoryMade had incubated PS, (formerly Private Suite LAX), a reservation only luxury terminal at Los Angeles International Airport co-founded by TPG Growth and Gavin DeBecker; La Reyna, a creative agency catering to a Latin audience; Miraval Olive Oil, a gourmet extra virgin olive oil launched in partnership with Brad Pitt and Angelina Jolie; and Salted, an online subscription-based cooking school. In 2018, FactoryMade developed the culinary experiential program Rediscovering America for Walmart. The program, designed to promote the importance of fresh, affordable, and locally grown produce, featured James Beard-recognized chefs who prepared and served food at their restaurants incorporating produce available at WalMart. In 2020, Fogelman founded and launched with Cris Patwa, the James Beard Foundation, and Brad Pitt the sparkling cold brew tea company, Enroot.

In November 2020, Fogelman partnered with Marc Geiger to found Gate 52, an initiative to acquire equity in small clubs and help them to expand as they recover from the impact of the Coronavirus pandemic. Geiger and Fogelman worked together as partners at William Morris for more than 10 years.

== Personal life ==
Fogelman and his wife, Sherri, have three children. From 2004 to 2012, he served on the board of directors for Mattel Children's Hospital UCLA. With Sherri, Fogelman established the Elsie and Isaac Fogelman Chair in the Division of Pediatric Neurology in the Department of Pediatrics at the David Geffen School of Medicine at UCLA.
