= DLC =

DLC or dlc may refer to:

== Arts and entertainment ==
- Downloadable content, additional content created for a released software that users can download
- Dead Letter Circus, an Australian band
- Dragonlance Classics, D&D roleplaying game modules
- "DLC", a 2023 song by Stray Kids from the album 5-Star

== Chemistry ==
- Diamond-like carbon
- Dioxins and dioxin-like compounds

== Computing ==
- Data Length Code, a field in a CAN bus frame
- Data link connector (automotive)
- Data Link Control, in the OSI networking model
- Development life cycle
- Digital loop carrier
- Discrete logarithm cryptography
- Double-layer capacitor, another term for a supercapacitor

== Law ==
- Driver License Compact, an American interstate agreement
- Dual-listed company, a corporate structure

== Organizations ==
- Democratic Leadership Council, an American nonprofit political corporation
- Developmental Learning Centre, for special schools or similar institutions
- Digital Liberty Coalition, an anti-censorship organization in Australia
- Duke Lemur Center, a habitat for lemurs in North Carolina

== Transport ==
- BLS Cargo Nord, formerly Dillen & Le Jeune Cargo, a train operator in Belgium
- Dalian Zhoushuizi International Airport, Liaoning, China (IATA code: DLC)

== Other uses ==
- Date and lot code, in product tracking
