= Internet censorship in Australia =

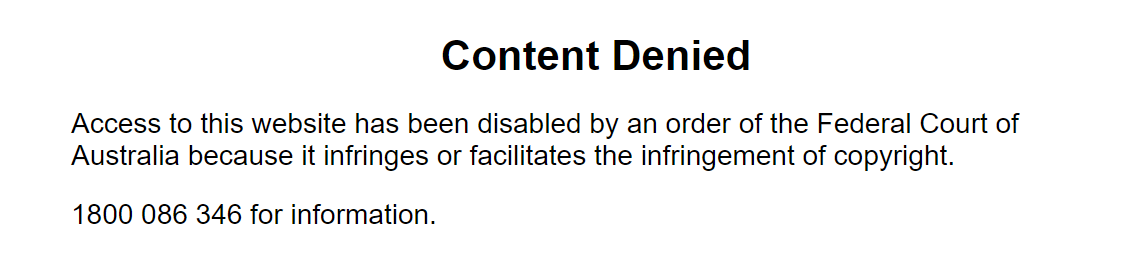
Page presented by Telstra when a censored page is requested

Internet censorship in Australia is enforced by both the country's criminal law as well as voluntarily enacted by internet service providers. The Australian Communications and Media Authority (ACMA) has the power to enforce content restrictions on Internet content hosted within Australia, and maintain a blocklist of overseas websites which is then provided for use in filtering software. The restrictions focus primarily on child pornography, sexual violence, and other illegal activities, compiled as a result of a consumer complaints process.

In October 2008, a policy extending Internet censorship to a system of mandatory filtering of overseas websites which are, or potentially would be, "refused classification" (RC) in Australia was proposed. Australia is classified as "under surveillance" (a type of "Internet enemy") by Reporters Without Borders due to the proposed legislation. If enacted, the legislation would have required Internet service providers to censor access to such content for all users. However, the policy was rejected by the Coalition and was later withdrawn by the Labor party. The same day the withdrawal was announced, the then Communications Minister stated that as a result of notices to Australian ISPs, over 90% of Australians using Internet Services were going to have a web filter. Australian Federal Police would then pursue smaller ISPs and work with them to meet their "obligation under Australian law". iiNet and Internode quietly confirmed that the request to censor content from Australian Federal Police went from voluntary to mandatory under s313 in an existing law. iiNet had sought legal advice and accepted the s313 mandatory notice but would not reveal the legal advice publicly.

In June 2015, the country passed an amendment which will allow the court-ordered censorship of websites deemed to primarily facilitate copyright infringement. In December 2016, the Federal Court of Australia ordered more than fifty ISPs to censor 5 sites that infringe on the Copyright Act after rights holders, Roadshow Films, Foxtel, Disney, Paramount, Columbia and the 20th Century Fox companies filed a lawsuit. The sites barred include The Pirate Bay, Torrentz, TorrentHound, IsoHunt and SolarMovie.

In April 2019, the Senate passed a bill in response to the Christchurch mosque shooting which required websites that provide a hosting service to "ensure the expeditious removal" of audio or visual material documenting "abhorrent violent conduct" (including terrorist acts, murder, attempted murder, torture, rape or kidnapping), produced by a perpetrator or accomplice, within a reasonable time frame. Hosts must also report such content to authorities. Those who do not remove the materials may face fines and jail time. Several ISPs had already voluntarily blocked websites related to footage of the Christchurch shooting before the bill had passed.

== Current status ==
In 2009, Australia's internet was considered "Under Surveillance" by Reporters without Borders.

A collection of both federal and state laws apply to Internet content in Australia.

=== Federal law ===
While the Australian constitution does not explicitly provide for freedom of speech or press, the High Court has held that a right to freedom of expression is implied in the constitution, and the government generally respects these rights in practice. An independent press, an effective judiciary, and a functioning democratic political system combine to ensure freedom of speech and press. There were no government restrictions on access to the Internet or credible reports that the government routinely monitored e-mail or Internet chat rooms. Individuals and groups can and do engage in the expression of views via the Internet, including by e-mail.

==== Broadcasting Services Act 1992 ====
Provisions of Schedule 5 and Schedule 7 of the Broadcasting Services Act 1992 inserted in 1999 and 2007 allow the Australian Communications and Media Authority to effectively ban some content from being hosted within Australia. Under this regime, if a complaint is issued about material "broadcast" on the Internet the ACMA is allowed to examine the material under the guidelines for film and video.

The content is deemed to be "prohibited" where it is (or in ACMA's judgement likely would be):

- Refused classification, or classified X18+
- Classified R18+, and not protected by an adult verification system
- Classified MA15+ and not protected by an adult verification system, where the user has paid to access the content.
- Cyberbullying

Where content is deemed to be prohibited, the ACMA is empowered to issue local sites with a takedown notice under which the content must be removed; failure to do so can result in fines of up to $11,000 per day. If the site is hosted outside Australia, the content in question is added to a blocklist of banned URLs. This list of banned Web pages is then added to filtering software (encrypted), which must be offered to all consumers by their Internet service providers. In March 2009, this blocklist was leaked online.

A number of take down notices have been issued to some Australian-hosted websites. According to Electronic Frontiers Australia in at least one documented case, the hosting was merely shifted to a server in the United States, and the DNS records updated so that consumers may never have noticed the change.

==== Suicide Related Materials Offences Act 2006 ====
In 2006, the Federal Parliament passed the Suicide Related Materials Offences Act, which makes it illegal to use communications media such as the Internet to discuss the practical aspects of suicide.

==== Copyright Amendment (Online Infringement) Bill 2015 ====
In June 2015, an amendment was passed to copyright law of Australia, which allows for the court-ordered censorship of non-domestic websites whose primary purpose is to facilitate copyright infringement.

==== Criminal Code Amendment (Sharing of Abhorrent Violent Material) Bill 2019 ====
In April 2019, the Senate passed this bill in response to the Christchurch mosque shooting, which was live-streamed and circulated online. It requires websites that provide a hosting service to "ensure the expeditious removal" of audio or visual material documenting "abhorrent violent conduct" (including terrorist acts, murder, attempted murder, torture, rape or kidnapping), produced by a perpetrator or accomplice, within a reasonable time-frame. Hosts must also identify and report such content to authorities. Those who do not remove the materials may face fines (including up to $10.5 million or 10% of annual revenue for corporations) and jail time. This law applies regardless of whether or not the content is hosted on servers in Australia. The bill has faced criticism for being imprecise, with no formal definition of how quickly sites must remove the abhorrent content, and being wider-reaching than needed (it applies to any service that hosts content, while the intent of the bill implied a goal to impose it on social networking services).

=== State and territory laws ===
Some state governments have laws that ban the transmission of material unsuitable for minors.

In New South Wales, Internet censorship legislation was introduced in 2001 which criminalises online material which is unsuitable for minors. In 2002, the New South Wales Standing Committee on Social Issues issued a report recommending that the legislation be repealed, and in response the New South Wales government stated that the legislation "will be neither commenced nor repealed" until after the review of the Commonwealth Internet censorship legislation had been completed.

=== Notable examples ===
In October 2000, Electronic Frontiers Australia (EFA) attempted under the Freedom of Information Act (FOI) to obtain documents relating to the implementation of the web filter. While a few were released, many were not, and in 2003 new legislation, "Communications Legislation Amendment Bill (No. 1) 2002", was passed by the Liberal government and four independents, and opposed by The Greens and the Australian Labor Party. While the stated reason for the bill was to prevent people accessing child pornography by examining the censored sites, this bill exempted whole documents from FOI, many of which did not reference prohibited content at all. EFA state that the bill was designed to prevent further public scrutiny of web filtering proposals.

In 2002, New South Wales Police Force Minister Michael Costa attempted, without success, to shut down three protest websites by appealing to the then-communications minister Richard Alston. The Green Left Weekly stated these were Melbourne Indymedia and S11 websites, and that the Australian Broadcasting Authority (the predecessor to ACMA) cleared them of breaching government regulations on 30 October 2002.

Also in 2002, and under the terms of the Racial Discrimination Act 1975, the Federal Court ordered Fredrick Töben to remove material from his Australian website which denied aspects of the Holocaust and vilified Jews.

In 2006, Richard Neville published a "spoof" website that had a fictional transcript of John Howard apologising to Australians for the Iraq War. The website was forcibly taken offline by the government with no recourse.

After the devastating bushfires in February 2009, details about an alleged arsonist were posted online by bloggers. Victoria Police deputy commissioner Kieran Walshe had asked the state Director of Public Prosecutions to examine the possibility of removing these blogs from the web, as they might jeopardise any court case.

In March 2009, after a user posted a link to a site on ACMA's blocklist on the Whirlpool forum, Whirlpool's service provider, Bulletproof Networks, was threatened with fines of $11,000 per day if the offending link was not removed. The same link in an article on EFA's website was removed in May 2009 after ACMA issued a "link-deletion notice", and the EFA took the precautionary step of also removing indirect links to the material in question.

The 2009 winner of the George Polk award for videography shows footage of 26-year-old Neda Agha-Soltan being shot and dying during Iran protests. This footage has also been declared "prohibited content" by ACMA, attracting fines of $11,000 per day for any Australian website which posts a link to the video.

On 15 December 2009, the Labor government announced plans to mandate censorship of refused classification material in Australia. The then Minister for Broadband, Communications and the Digital Economy, Senator Stephen Conroy, released a statement titled Measures to improve safety of the internet for families, which briefly outlined the proposed purpose and methods of filtering. The scheme aimed to develop "a package that balances safety for families and the benefits of the digital revolution", and was intended to complement the work of the ACMA by blocking content hosted overseas which is out of the control of Australian authorities.

An anti-censorship website was hosted on stephenconroy.com.au and stephen-conroy.com, satirising Senator Conroy and his proposed blocklist. The site referred to Conroy as the "minister for fascism", and contained humorous graphics and statements condemning censorship. On 18 December 2009, the domain stephenconroy.com.au was seized by auDA, somewhat ironically for an anti-censorship site, and content was then moved to stephen-conroy.com. The basis for seizure regarded the moral owner of the domain, not its content.

On 22 May 2009, it was disclosed in the press, citing WikiLeaks, that the Australian Government had added Dr Philip Nitschke's online Peaceful Pill Handbook, which deals with the topic of voluntary euthanasia, to the blocklist maintained by the Australian Communications & Media Authority used to filter web access to citizens of Australia. Euthanasia groups will hold seminars around Australia teaching how to evade the proposed filter using proxy servers and virtual networks. A spokeswoman for Senator Conroy said that euthanasia would not be targeted by the proposed web filter, however Stephen Conroy has previously stated that "while euthanasia remains illegal it will be captured by the RC filter".

In January 2010, the Encyclopedia Dramatica article "Aboriginal" was removed from the search engine results of Google Australia, following a complaint that its content was racist. George Newhouse, the lawyer for the complainant, claims the site is "illegal" and should be blocked by the mandatory web filter. As the address of the site appeared on the leaked ACMA blocklist, it is likely that the whole site would be censored by the filter. A search on terms related to the article will produce a message that one of the results has been removed after a legal request relating to Australia's Racial Discrimination Act 1975.

In 2010, the website of the Australian Sex Party is banned from within several state and federal government departments, including Stephen Conroy's Australian Communications & Media Authority. Convenor of the Australian Sex Party Fiona Patten has described this ban as "unconstitutional".

In April 2013, it was revealed that an IP address used by more than 1,200 websites had been censored by certain Internet service providers. It was discovered by the Melbourne Free University which was one of the sites censored. It was later revealed that the Australian Securities & Investments Commission (ASIC) had ordered the censorship of the address to target a fraud website, and that the remaining websites were censored unintentionally. The block was subsequently lifted. ASIC subsequently revealed that it had used its censorship powers 10 times over the preceding 12 months, and that a separate action taken in March had also caused the inadvertent temporary censorship of around 1000 untargeted active sites, as well as around 249,000 sites that hosted "no substantive content" or advertised their domain name for sale. The censorship was carried out under the section 313 legislation, and censorship notices were sent to four or five ISPs on each occasion.

In March 2019, several websites disseminating footage of the Christchurch mosque shooting were censored by major ISPs in Australia and New Zealand, including 4chan, 8chan, and LiveLeak.

On 2 September 2020, a woman was arrested in Ballarat for making a Facebook post that promoted a protest over COVID-19 restrictions in Victoria. A viral video from before her incitement charge shows her offering to take the post down and trying to convince the police that she did not know it was illegal. Rosalind Croucher of the Australian Human Rights Commission and Wendy Harris of the Victorian Bar both expressed concerns that police had infringed on freedom of expression with a disproportionate response. Politicians Michael O'Brien and Steven Ciobo, while reaffirming their support for the lockdown, also criticised the arrest as heavy handed.

== Voluntary censorship by ISPs ==
=== 2011 child abuse filtering ===
In June 2011, two Australian ISPs, Telstra and Optus, confirmed they would voluntarily block access to a list of child-abuse websites provided by the Australian Communications & Media Authority and more websites on a list compiled by unnamed international organisations from mid-year.

=== Christchurch mosque shootings ===
On 20 March 2019, Telstra, Optus, TPG and Vodafone censored access to several websites in response to the Christchurch mosque shootings in New Zealand. The websites, which included LiveLeak, 4chan, 8chan, Voat, Kiwi Farms and Zero Hedge, were blocked for allegedly hosting footage of the shootings that was originally live-streamed on Facebook.

Sites were banned using a combination of DNS blocking and IP blocking. DNS blocking is relatively easy to circumvent (whether implemented through ISP-controlled DNS servers or sniffing all DNS requests); whereas IP bans can only be circumvented with a proxy, VPN or Tor. Information on the exact methods and timeframes that sites were blocked is vague and anecdotal, but there was a significant amount of online discussion at the time. Optus appeared to use IP blocks for 4chan and possibly other sites. Telstra took a similar approach. Most bans appeared to be lifted after several weeks, with 4chan and Voat bans extending longer. One source states that the Telstra bans lasted only "a few hours", but this does not agree with most online discussion.

The telecom providers claimed to be acting independently and not under directive of government or law enforcement, which sparked some public controversy. Normally such censorship would be ordered by the Australian Communications & Media Authority, but this event exposed the independent power that ISPs may exercise.

Telstra released a brief statement soon after blocking the sites, referring to "extraordinary circumstances" that required an "extraordinary response". TPG did not officially respond to media inquires other than a statement that it would "comply with any request of this nature made to us by authorities"; however, user reports indicate that TPG also temporarily blocked access to a subset of these sites.

== Proposed mandatory filtering legislation ==
In October 2008, the governing Australian Labor Party proposed extending Internet censorship to a system of mandatory filtering of overseas websites which are, or potentially would be, "refused classification" (RC) in Australia. As of June 2010, legislation to enact the proposed policy had not been drafted. The proposal has generated substantial opposition, with a number of concerns being raised by opponents and only a few groups strongly supporting the policy.

In November 2010, the Department of Broadband, Communications and the Digital Economy (DBCDE) released a document indicating that the earliest date any new legislation could reach parliament was mid-2013. However, voluntary filtering by ISPs remains a possibility.

=== Terminology ===
Proposed Australian laws on Internet censorship are sometimes referred to as the Great Firewall of Australia, Rabbit Proof Firewall (a reference to the Australian Rabbit-proof fence), Firewall Australia or Great Firewall Reef (a reference to Great Barrier Reef and the Great Firewall of China).

The proposed filter has been referred to in the media variously as an Internet filter and a web filter. The worldwide-web is a myriad of software documents containing pointers to each other, hosted on server computers around the world. The Internet is the physical network used to convey requests from users' computers to these servers and responses from the servers back to the users.

The proposed filter only monitors certain ports specific to conveying web traffic. As it aims to monitor the majority of web traffic, it is appropriately referred to as a web filter. As it is agnostic of the majority (99.99%) of other connections a user's computer might establish with other computers on the Internet, it is something of a misnomer to refer to it as an Internet filter.

Since the proposed filter is situated at the Internet service provider (the junction between users and the Internet at large), introducing such a filter cannot possibly slow down the Internet itself. It can only (potentially) slow down access to the Internet by users of that ISP. Ignoring load considerations, communication speed across the Internet for any non-web traffic would be unaffected.

=== History ===
In 1995, the Labor Party of Federal Government began inquiries into regulating access to online content as part of expanding the scope of classification material mediums.

In the same year, the Liberal Party of Victoria and Western Australia State Governments and Country Liberal Party of Northern Territory Government implemented changes to law that allows censoring online content as part of expanding the scope of classification material. Queensland introduced similar legislation at the time, but a case of an ISP systems administrator showed it did not apply to online services when the judge ruled that the act did not apply.

In 1996, the Labor Party of New South Wales State Government attempted to propose a standard Internet censorship legislation for all Australian States and Territories. The legislation would have made ISPs responsible for their customers' communications. But the proposed legislation attracted widespread protests and has since been postponed in favour of a national scheme.

In 1997, following the previous Federal Government, the Liberal Party further commissioned inquiries into a variety of online censorship schemes, including self-imposed censorship by ISPs.

By 1999, the then Federal Government attempted to introduce an Internet censorship regime. Some have pointed out it was to gain support from minority senators to assist with the sale of Telstra and introduction of GST, but as noted above, this censorship plan had been in development for several years.

In 2001, CSIRO was commissioned to examine Internet content filtering. The report focused primarily on evaluating the effectiveness of client-side filtering schemes (which were generally ineffective), but also discussed some of the difficulties with ISP-based filtering

In March 2003, the Fairfax papers The Age and the Sydney Morning Herald reported the results of a survey taken by The Australia Institute of 200 children, which found that many of them had found pornography on the Internet. Over the next few days was a storm of media and political attention, and there were calls for finer Internet filters and tougher censorship laws. Analysis of the report showed little new material, and only 2% of girls had admitted being exposed to pornography, while the figure for boys was 38%; such a difference between boys and girls would seem to indicate that inadvertent exposure was rare, contrary to the conclusions of the report. After the controversy died down, no new action resulted from the new report, media attention, or political speeches.

In 2003, the Labor Party opposed filtering at the ISP level, with Labor Senator Kate Lundy stating

"Unfortunately, such a short memory regarding the debate in 1999 about Internet content has led the coalition to already offer support for greater censorship by actively considering proposals for unworkable, quick fixes that involve filtering the Internet at the ISP level."

Shortly before the 2004 federal election, two political parties issued new policies on Internet censorship. The Australian Labor Party's policy involved voluntary adherence by users. The Family First Party released a far stricter policy of mandatory filtering at the Internet service provider level.

The Australian Family Association petitioned the Australian Federal Government in 2004 to further restrict access by children to pornographic material via the Internet. The petition was submitted in December 2004.

On 21 March 2006, the Labor Party committed to requiring all ISPs to implement a mandatory Internet blocking system applicable to "all households, and to schools and other public Internet points" to "prevent users from accessing any content that has been identified as prohibited by the Australian Communications and Media Authority".

On the same day, the then communications minister Helen Coonan stated that to

"filter the Internet will only result in slowing down the Internet for every Australian without effectively protecting children from inappropriate and offensive content".

=== Political party policies, positions and statements ===
==== Labor Party ====
On 31 December 2007, Stephen Conroy announced the Federal Government's intention to introduce an ISP-based filter to censor "inappropriate material" from the Internet to protect children. In this announcement, it was stated that adults could opt out of the filter to receive uncensored access to the Internet.

In May 2008, the government commenced an $82 million "cybersafety plan" which included an additional mandatory filter with no opt-out provision. This ISP-based filter aims to stop adults from downloading content that is illegal to possess in Australia, such as child pornography or materials related to terrorism.

In March 2009, Stephen Conroy dismissed suggestions that the Government would use the filter to crack down on political dissent as "conspiracy theories". He stated that the filter would only be used to remove "refused classification" (RC) content, using the same rationale as existing television, radio and print publications, and that the Senate could be relied upon to provide rigorous assessment of any proposed legislation. However, Labor's policy statement on the issue contradicts this. It is also contrary to an earlier ministerial release in 2008.

The most recent explanation of the government's position on this issue is provided on the ministry website. This clearly states that only ISP-level filtering of (designated) refused classification (RC) material will be mandatory under their policy. However, ISP's will be encouraged to offer ISP-level filtering of 'adult content' as an optional (commercial) service to their customers. Such an optional extra service is aimed at parents trying to protect their children from 'undesirable' content that would otherwise be available, because it would not be RC (e.g., it might receive a classification of "R").

Labor Senator Kate Lundy said in January 2010 that she is lobbying within the party for an "opt-out" filter, describing it as the "least worst" option. In February 2010 she said she would propose the opt-out option when the filtering legislation goes before caucus.

Stephen Conroy has stated that 85% of Internet Service Providers, including Telstra, Optus, iPrimus, and iiNet, welcome the Internet filter. In response, Steve Dalby, iiNet's chief regulatory officer, stated that iiNet as a company does not support the Internet filter, and never has.

On 9 July 2010, Stephen Conroy announced that any mandatory filtering would be delayed until at least 2011.

On 9 November 2012, Stephen Conroy shelved the proposed mandatory filter legislation in favour of existing legislation, touting that it was successful in compelling the largest ISPs to adopt a filter. As a result, 90% of Australian Internet users are censored from accessing some web-based content.

==== The Liberal/Nationals Coalition ====
In February 2009, then opposition communications spokesman Nick Minchin obtained independent legal advice confirming that a mandatory censorship regime would require new legislation. In March 2009, after the ACMA blocklist was leaked and iiNet withdrew from the filtering trials, he stated that Stephen Conroy was "completely botching the implementation of this filtering policy".

In March 2010, shadow treasurer Joe Hockey attacked the filter, saying "What we have in the government's Internet filtering proposals is a scheme that is likely to be unworkable in practice. But more perniciously it is a scheme that will create the infrastructure for government censorship on a broader scale". During the 2010 Federal Election, Liberal communications spokesman Tony Smith announced that "a Coalition government will not introduce a mandatory ISP level filter", with Joe Hockey also announcing an intention to vote against the policy if Labor is re-elected. This followed the 2010 Federal Conference of the National Party passing a motion proposed by the Young Nationals to "oppose any mandatory ISP-level internet censorship".

In November 2012, Coalition Communications spokesman welcomed the proposed legislation being dropped as it endangered freedom and Internet performance. However, some Coalition members voiced concern, citing support for a mandatory filter to protect children and families but will not propose it citing lack of political support at the time. The Coalition have proposed an "eSafety commissioner" to take down undesirable content from the Internet as a means to protect children. It was met with criticism as a duplication of current government efforts and "difficult and expensive" to implement.

In September 2013, two days before the federal election, the Coalition announced they would introduce an opt-out filter for all Internet connections, including both fixed line and mobile devices. This has since been retracted as "poorly worded" in a statement from Malcolm Turnbull, who said, "The correct position is that the Coalition will encourage mobile phone and Internet service providers to make available software which parents can choose to install on their own devices to protect their children from inappropriate material."

==== The Greens ====
The Greens do not support the filter, and Greens senator Scott Ludlam predicts that due to obstruction in the Senate, the legislation will not be introduced until after the next federal election.

At the end of 2008, he asked questions in parliament related to the filtering trial, for which the Government provided answers in January 2009:

- When asked about the stated public demand for Internet filtering, the government responded that the filtering was an election commitment
- The web filter would be easy to bypass using technological measures
- 674 out of 1,370 censored sites on the mandatory list relate to child pornography; 506 sites would be classified as R18+ or X18+, despite the fact that such content is legal to view in Australia. The remaining 190 sites from this number on the blocklist can be viewed at the full revealed blocklists on WikiLeaks.

Ludlam believes that the Labor party may have hit a wall of "technical impossibility", and the filter does not suit its purpose:

"This isn't a great advertisement for the workability of any large scale scheme. The proposal has always been unpopular, now perhaps the Government is starting to come to grips with what the industry has been saying all along: if your policy objective is to protect children on-line, this is not the way to go about it."

Despite their lack of support for the filter, The Greens preselected Clive Hamilton, whose think-tank The Australia Institute first suggested an ISP-based Internet filter, for the by-election in the seat of Higgins.

==== Independents and minor parties ====
In October 2008, Family First senator Senator Steve Fielding was reported to support the censorship of hardcore pornography and fetish material under the government's plans to filter access to the web. A Family First spokeswoman confirmed that the party wants X-rated content banned for everyone, including adults.

A spokesman for independent senator Nick Xenophon said:

"should the filtering plan go ahead, he would look to use it to block Australians from accessing overseas online casino sites, which are illegal to run in Australia".

Senator Xenophon has, however, stated that he has serious concerns about the plan, and in February 2009 withdrew all support, stating that "the more evidence that's come out, the more questions there are on this". He believes that money would be better spent educating parents and cracking peer-to-peer groups used by paedophiles.

A political party associated with the Eros Association, the Australian Sex Party, was launched in November 2008 and plans to campaign on issues including censorship and the federal government's promised web filter. In 2014, the party won a seat in the Victorian Legislative Council.

=== Two blocklists ===
As of October 2008, the plan includes two blocklists, the first used to filter "illegal" content, and the second used to filter additional content unsuitable for children. The first filter will be mandatory for all users of the Internet, while the second filter allows opting out. The government will not release details of the content on either list, but has stated that the mandatory filter would include at least 10,000 sites, and include both the ACMA blocklist and UK's Internet Watch Foundation (IWF) blocklist. In December 2008 the IWF list caused problems when the Wikipedia article Virgin Killer was added to the list, as it prevented many people in the UK from being able to edit Wikipedia.

The ACMA definitions of "prohibited content" give some idea of what could potentially be blocklisted. Online content prohibited by ACMA includes:

- Any online content that is classified RC or X 18+ by the Classification Board. This includes real depictions of actual sexual activity, child pornography, depictions of bestiality, material containing excessive violence or sexual violence, detailed instruction in crime, violence or drug use, and/or material that advocates the doing of a terrorist act.
- Content which is classified R 18+* and not subject to a restricted access system that prevents access by children. This includes depictions of simulated sexual activity, material containing strong, realistic violence and other material dealing with intense adult themes.

In answer to a question in Parliament in October 2008, the government in January 2009 stated that of the 1,370 websites on the blocklist, 674 were related to child pornography, and the remainder would be classified as R18+ and X18+.

Two websites are known to be on the ACMA blocklist after they were submitted to ACMA for review. When ACMA responded with the advice that these sites had been placed upon its denial list, ACMA's response was in turn posted back to the web by the original submitters, with the purpose of demonstrating that political content would be censored by the mandatory filter. One was an anti-abortion website, with details posted to Whirlpool, and the other was a copy of Denmark's own Internet blocklist, with both the blocklist and ACMA's response posted on WikiLeaks. The web hosting company for Whirlpool, Bulletproof networks, was threatened with $11,000 in fines per day if the link was not removed, so Whirlpool removed the link to the restricted site. Civil liberties campaigners regard the inclusion of these sites on the blocklist as a demonstration that it is not difficult to get a site placed on the blocklist, and that the blocklist includes sites which are themselves not illegal to view.

=== Leaking of the ACMA blocklist ===
18 March 2009: WikiLeaks publishes a list which is

"derived from the ACMA list for the use of government-approved censorship software in its "ACMA-only" mode." Included in the list were "the websites of a Queensland dentist, a tuckshop convener and a kennel operator".

19 March 2009: Australian media sources report that the ACMA blocklist has been leaked to WikiLeaks

"The seemingly innocuous websites were among a leaked list of 2300 websites the Australian Communications and Media Authority was planning to ban to protect children from graphic pornography and violence."

ACMA claimed that the list which appeared on the WikiLeaks website was not the ACMA 'blocklist', as it contained 2,300 URLs. ACMA claimed the ACMA list contained only 1,061 URLs in August 2008, and has at no stage contained 2,300.

The ACMA report on the issue noted the similarities between the two lists, yet addressed only the claim reported in the media that the list was the blocklist. The report only contains the following claims about the two lists:

- "The list provided to ACMA differs markedly in length and format to the ACMA blocklist."
- "The ACMA blocklist has at no stage been 2,300 URLs in length and at August 2008 consisted of 1,061 URLs."

20 March 2009: WikiLeaks published another list, this time closer to the length published by ACMA. WikiLeaks believes that the list is up-to-date as of the time of publication

25 March 2009: Stephen Conroy has reportedly stated that this list closely resembles the ACMA list.

26 March 2009: The above report of 25 March 2009 was followed by the Minister's statement on the ABC's Q&A television program the following day that "the second list which has appeared appears to be closer [to the true deny-list]. I don't actually know what's on the list but I'm told by [...] ACMA it appears to be closer to the actual, legitimate list."
On the program Senator Conroy also explained that the seemingly inexplicable censoring of a dentist's website was due to subversion of the website by the Russian mafia, who had inserted RC material.

In the same discussion Bill Henson's website, despite the PG rating given to his photographs by the same body, appeared on the blocklist due to a technical error according to Stephen Conroy The ACMA has since released a statement claiming the technical error was a "computer system caching error" and further stated "found that this is the only URL where a caching error resulting in the URL being incorrectly added to the list."

=== Live filtering trials ===
The government has committed to trials of the mandatory web filter before implementation.

On 28 July 2008, an Australian Communications & Media Authority report entitled "Closed Environment Testing of ISP-Level Internet Content Filtering" showed performance and accuracy problems with the six unnamed ISP-based filters trialled. EFA analysis of the report showed that:

- One filter caused a 22% drop in speed even when it was not performing filtering;
- Only one of the six filters had an acceptable level of performance (a drop of 2% in a laboratory trial), the others causing drops in speed of between 21% and 86%;
- The most accurate filters were often the slowest;
- All filters tested had problems with under-censoring, allowing access to between 2% and 13% of material that they should have censored; and
- All filters tested had serious problems with over-censoring, wrongly censoring access to between 1.3% and 7.8% of the websites tested.
- The trial tested speed on a simple "black listed or not" basis for all simulated clients on all systems, yet the report outlines the ability of the filters to provide customised filtering to each client (as would be required by the two levels of filtering which ACMA is proposing) which would significantly impact test results.

In November 2008, the Government hired Melbourne company ENEX TestLab, an RMIT spin-off, to design a live pilot test on a real network. In this trial, in which several ISPs have expressed an interest, 10,000 blocklisted "unwanted" websites would be censored in addition to 1,300 websites identified by ACMA. As an incentive for participation, the department states that participating ISPs "will be recognised for their participation in the Pilot. This recognition will strengthen their brand image with the community".

These ISPs will also be allowed to keep any software and hardware purchased by the government for the trial. The trial may include some ability to censor or alert on the presence of proxies. Both filtered and unfiltered users will be surveyed as part of the trial.

ISPs participating in the Live Trial will be required to enter into a non-disclosure agreement with ACMA.

Communications from Senator Conroy's office have indicated that the live trial will occur without the participation of any customers due to concerns about the impact on network performance of filtering 10,000 URLs. Telstra and Internode have stated that they will not take part in the trial. iiNet has stated that it will take part in the trial only to show that the filtering will not work. Optus has stated that it will only test a heavily cut-down filtering model containing only 1,300 URLs in a limited geographic area, and customers will be allowed to opt out.

At the end of 2008, Stephen Conroy anticipated that the live trial would test the filtering of BitTorrent traffic, but in March 2009 he stated that the proposed filters would not be effective on peer-to-peer traffic.

The trial was originally scheduled to be commenced in December 2008, but, after the existence of a report critical of the trial became known, the trial was pushed back. On 11 February 2009 a new filtering trial was announced, initially with the ISPs iPrimus Telecommunications, Tech 2U, Webshield, OMNIconnect, Netforce and Highway 1. Testing with each ISP will take place for at least six weeks once filtering equipment has been obtained and installed, and iPrimus expects the trial to begin in late April or early May with five or ten thousand participants. The trial will be opt-in, with ISPs asking for volunteers, although all WebShield customers already receive a filtered service. None of the top three ISPs, Telstra, Optus and iiNet, have been included in the trial, although both iiNet and Optus did expect to be involved at a later time. iiNet withdrew itself from consideration for the trial in March 2009, with Michael Malone giving as reasons the media storm around the leaked blocklist, the changing nature of policy, and "confused" explanations of the trial's purpose.

In July 2009, some results from the trials began to emerge. Five of the nine participating ISPs reported minimal speed or technical problems associated with the trials. Some ISPs reported that thousands of their members had voluntarily participated in the trials; others, that less than 1% had participated, and that this was not a representative sample. Some customers complained about over-blocking, and withdrew from the trial. One example was the censorship of the pornography website RedTube: ACMA refused to confirm or deny if the site was on the list, or if the site was legal. Leading Australian statistic experts, however, have labelled the trials as unscientific, lacking in proper methodology, unrepresentative and "about the worst way you can do it".

In December 2009, the results of the filtering trial were released. Stephen Conroy stated, "The report into the pilot trial of ISP-level filtering demonstrates that censoring RC-rated material can be done with 100 percent accuracy and negligible impact on Internet speed". However, concerns have been raised about the report: only a small minority of ISP users participated; the trial did not test using any high-speed Internet connections similar to those available with the National Broadband Network; there is evidence that the filter was evaded; and with only 600 to 700 sites on the RC blocklists, the effect of the filter would be marginal at best.

=== Opinion polling ===
In February 2010, ABC's Hungry Beast program commissioned McNair Ingenuity Research to perform a telephone poll of 1,000 Australians. Key results were

- To the proposition "We need Government regulation of content on the Internet the same as we have Government regulation of content for other media" 62% agreed, 35% disagreed.
- "Having a mandatory Government Internet filter that would automatically censor all access in Australia, to overseas websites containing material that is Refused Classification?" Refused Classification was defined as "Images and information about one or more of the following: child sexual abuse, bestiality, sexual violence, gratuitous, exploitative or offensive sexual fetishes, detailed instructions on or promotion of crime, violence or use of illegal drugs". 80% were in favour, 19% against.
- "A Government appointed body determining whether a website is appropriate for you to visit?" 50% in favour, 46% against.
- "If a mandatory Internet Filter is established, are you in favour or not in favour of the community being advised which websites have been Refused Classification and the reason why they have been refused classification?" 91% in favour, 8% against.
- "Some opponents of the Government's mandatory Internet Filter are concerned that if it were put in place, future Governments could use Internet Filtering technology to restrict free speech or censor other forms of website content they don't approve of. Do you share this concern?" 70% concerned, 27% unconcerned.

The wide variation to answers to essentially the same question can be attributed to variations in the wording of the questions asked. The results were initially reported as "80pc back web filter: poll" despite the fact that 46% were against "a government body determining whether a website is appropriate to visit".

In February 2009, a national telephone poll of 1,100 people was conducted by Galaxy and commissioned by GetUp!. It found that only 5 per cent of respondents want ISPs to be responsible for protecting children online, and only 4% want Government to have this responsibility.

In March 2010, the results of the Whirlpool Australia broadband survey 2009 were published. This survey was of 21,755 experienced Internet users, and only 8% were in favour of the mandatory filter.

In May 2010, the results of a study commissioned by the Safer Internet Group (consisting of Google, Internet Industry Association, iiNet, Australian Council of State School Organisations and the Australian Library and Information Association) were published. 39 people participated in four focus group interviews. The study consisted of four focus-group interviews of 39 participants and found that while people were aware of the pending legislation, they did not understand its details. When details of the government's proposal was explained, along with the possible alternatives, enthusiasm for the filter dropped.

=== Australian Law Reform Commission review ===
In July 2010, Justice Minister Robert McClelland ordered the Australian Law Reform Commission (ALRC) to review the criteria for the "refused classification" (RC) category, while also conducting public consultation and evaluating the practices and codes of companies in the sector.

The ALRC's report, released in February 2012, includes recommendations that:

- Type of content targeted by filtering rules should focus on adult content
- Content should be censored by ISPs only when it is defined as "prohibited"
- Government review prohibitions on "the depiction of sexual fetishes in films and detailed instruction in the use of proscribed drugs"
- Ban on content that "promotes, incites or instructs in matters of crime" be limited only to serious crime
- New media content classification act should be enacted to cover the classification of all media in Australia on any platform, and spell out how those responsible for content, including Internet service providers, should rank prohibited content
- Because of the large number of online media organisations, it would not be possible to classify everything and ISPs should "take reasonable steps" to identify prohibited content, including allowing users to report such content online

=== Internet Industry Association filter code ===
Internet Industry Association (IIA) had released a filter code on child abuse for the industry. IIA have stated that no new legislation amendments were required because ISPs were installing filters to censor access to facilitate carrying out legal requests under s313 of the Telecommunications Act. However no known code has been publicly released yet.

Internode, TPG and Exetel have been against the scheme, unless the law compels them. iiNet is one notable exception in that they will work with the law, without a position on the scheme. Vodafone is supporting the IIA filter code, but it is unclear whether they will implement it.

=== Legality of mandatory filtering for users ===
There are concerns that censoring access based on the Interpol blocklist can constitute a criminal act of "impairment of an electronic communication," according to Peter Black (QUT internet law lecturer), the maximum penalty for which is ten years in prison. There was concerns that since Telstra's filter is now live, the telco has not changed the end use agreement about restricting access or notified their customers. Telecommunications Industry Ombudsman stopped short of saying Telstra and Optus breached existing contracts, saying the question was "hypothetical one".

== Anti-censorship campaigns ==
In May 1999 there were national protests against the proposed Federal Internet censorship legislation.

Protests involving hundreds of people were held on 1 November 2008, with people in all capital cities nationwide marching on state Parliaments, and on 13 December 2008, in all capital cities. The Digital Liberty Coalition organised these protests, declaring an intent to rally continuously until censorship as a whole is taken off the table.

The Internet-based political activism organisation, GetUp!, which has previously run mainstream campaigns action against WorkChoices and to free David Hicks, is backing the offline action of the DLC to oppose the web censorship plan. GetUp! first called for donations during December 2008 to raise awareness of Internet censorship in Australia. The group raised an unprecedented $30,000 before the end of the appeal's first day.

GetUp! teamed up with award-winning, non-traditional and digital creative agency Fnuky Advertising to launch a campaign in Australia to raise awareness of the Australian Government's flawed plans to introduce web censorship. The campaign impersonated the Australian Federal Government by presenting web censorship as a mock consumer product branded as Censordyne, a parody of the toothpaste brand Sensodyne. Fnuky Advertising's Creative Director, David Campbell selected toothpaste as the platform for the campaign after Stephen Conroy stated the purpose of web censorship in Australia was to "Fight Moral Decay". The Censordyne campaign was launched online during July 2009 by a single Twitter post by fake Stephen Conroy, a popular impersonator of the Australian Communications Minister, Stephen Conroy. The campaign featured an online video, a Censordyne product website and a Censordyne search engine. Within 24 hours of launch, the words GetUp and Censordyne were the number 2 and 3 most talked about brands on Twitter worldwide. The campaign received widespread coverage in most major Australian newspapers and news websites. Censordyne become a topic of discussion on Nova 96.9 radio in Sydney and was featured on the Australian ABC television program Insiders.

GetUp! raised over $45,000 in donations from the general public during July 2009 to see the Censordyne commercial on TV and on Qantas flights during the month of August 2009, where all Australian politicians would be travelling to Canberra. Following the Censordyne campaign launch, Qantas chose to censor the anti-censorship campaign from their flights.

=== Response ===
The debate over Internet filtering has incited some tension in Australia, with threatening phone calls and emails being received by advocates of both sides of the debate.

In a speech in January 2010, U.S. Secretary of State Hillary Clinton accuses countries with Internet censorship of breaching the UN's Universal Declaration of Human Rights, and the Australian filter fits her definition for censorship. Stephen Conroy welcomed Clinton's speech, and agrees with her that "freedom of expression has its limits". Colin Jacobs responded in turn to note that while there are limits to free speech, Clinton had stated that the advantages of the Internet would be jeopardised by introducing censorship. As part of a diplomatic assault by the United States on Internet censorship in many countries, U.S. State Department spokesman Noel Clay has raised concerns about the filter plan with Australian officials.

The leaders of three of Australia's largest ISPs (Telstra, iiNet, and Internode) have stated in an interview that the web filtering proposal simply cannot work for various technical, legal and ethical reasons. The managing director of iiNet, Michael Malone, has said of Stephen Conroy: "This is the worst Communications Minister we've had in the 15 years since the [Internet] industry has existed", and plans to sign up his ISP for participation in live filtering trials by 24 December to provide the government with "hard numbers" demonstrating "how stupid it [the filtering proposal] is".

Dale Clapperton, then chairperson of EFA, argued that the Labor party cannot implement the clean feed proposal without either new legislation and the support of the Australian Senate, or the assistance of the Internet Industry Association. As the Liberals and Greens have both stated that they will not support legislation, it can only be implemented with the support of the IIA.

International lobby group Netchoice, which is backed by companies including eBay, Time Warner and Oracle Corporation is likely to oppose the mandatory filter. Google opposes the filter primarily because the scope of content to be filtered is too wide, and is likely to delay the introduction of Google TV to Australia because of technical concerns about the filter.

Internode engineer Mark Newton was the subject of a letter of complaint from Stephen Conroy's office for his participation in a Whirlpool forum showing the negative impact of the filter on Internet access speeds.

Some child welfare groups including Save the Children and the National Children's & Youth Law Centre have criticised the filtering plan as ineffective, stating that resources would be better spent elsewhere, and agreeing with the opposing position presented by Australia's ISPs. Other child welfare groups continue to support the filters. In 2008, ChildWise defended the plan as "a victory for common sense".

NSW Young Labor has abandoned the web filtering plan, passing a motion rejecting Conroy's plans, and calling on him to adopt a voluntary, opt-in system.

Conservative South Australian Liberal Senator Cory Bernardi does not support the mandatory web filter. He considers Stephen Conroy's plan to be "so devoid of detail" that it is impossible to form an opinion on it, and says

"Parental responsibility cannot and should not be abrogated to government—if it is, our society will only become weaker ... Yes, illegal content should be banned from the web ... but it is wrong to give the government a blank cheque to determine what is appropriate for us to view on the Internet."

Clive Hamilton, a senior ethics professor at the Australian National University whose think tank The Australia Institute was responsible for the initial media attention for a mandatory Internet filter in 2003, argues

"The laws that mandate upper speed limits do not stop people from speeding, does that mean that we should not have those laws? ... We live in a society, and societies have always imposed limits on activities that it deems are damaging. There is nothing sacrosanct about the Internet."

Despite proposing the filter, he has been chosen by The Greens to stand in the Federal seat of Higgins.

Retired Justice Michael Kirby believes that it is a bad example for the government of a democratic country like Australia to take control of what people hear and what information they get, and made comparisons to the situation in Iran and Burma.

In an open letter to Prime Minister Kevin Rudd, Reporters Without Borders states that the web filter is not the solution to combating child sex abuse, and the plan entails risks to freedom of expression. The censorship of websites by the Australian Communications & Media Authority, rather than a Judge, is in contravention of laws. The criteria for censoring "inappropriate" websites is too vague, and it would be a dangerous censorship option to target "Refused classification" sites, many of which are unrelated to sexual abuse. Subjects such as abortion, anorexia, aborigines and legislation on the sale of marijuana would all risk being filtered, as would media reports on these subjects.

The Howard Government commissioned a number of independent technical experts to examine Internet filtering. The resulting report was delivered to the Australian Government in February 2008, and released publicly in December 2008. Professor Bjorn Landfeldt, one of the report's authors, stated that filtering technology simply does not work, as it can easily be bypassed and slows access to the Internet by up to 87%. In response, Stephen Conroy has stated that the report involved no empirical testing, and was simply a literature review of material available from other sources; any problems raised by the report would be tested during the filter trials scheduled for mid-January 2009.

A report by Tim Stevens and Peter Neumann for the London-based International Centre for the Study of Radicalisation and Political Violence (ICSR) analyses each of the available ISP-based filtering solutions and concludes that they are ineffective in the fight against terror. A hybrid filtering scheme was rated the best, but it is ineffective against dynamic content such as chat pages and instant messaging, and had political implications because it required the existence of a blocklist of censored pages. The report instead advocates the use of takedown notices for extremist content, and prosecutions to "signal that individuals engaged in online extremism are not beyond the law".

The Metaverse Journal suggests that because web filtering logs every site visit, and some information about who is visiting the site, then it is ripe for abuse by whoever runs the filters. It potentially allows surveillance of any user of the Internet, such as journalists, political opponents, or even the family members of politicians.

Ross Fitzgerald of The Australian believes that the filter was not introduced in 2010 to defuse it as an election issue, and that if it is re-introduced into the next parliament it could be even more censorious than the current proposal.

Australian radio presenter and writer Helen Razer dislikes the filter because she enjoys pornography, does not believe it causes harm to adults, and doesn't think that children are at much risk:

"I enjoy pornography. Perhaps not quite so much as I enjoy living among citizens who take an entitlement to free speech for granted. But I do like it quite a lot. And it seems that my porn is endangered. If Conroy's clean feed works, which some tech sceptics argue that it cannot, it will prevent access to all pornography ... I can report that one doesn't simply amble into X-rated or even R18+ material ... I have become adept at this; children, presumably, have not. And if they have, clearly they are the issue of the world's most reprehensible parents and should be sent to live with Hetty Johnston forthwith ... Despite the best efforts of some, there is no evidence that pornography will negatively affect me or other consenting adults ... The only lasting effect of my access to porn is a reflex giggle when the pizza delivery man knocks on my door."

=== Attacks on government websites ===
On 26 March 2009, the Australian Classification Board's website, https://www.classification.gov.au/, was attacked by the Internet group Anonymous, automatically redirecting visitors to a page on the same site with a message mocking censorship efforts with the text:

This site contains information about the boards that have the right to CONTROL YOUR FREEDOMZ. The Classification Board has the right to not just classify content (the name is an ELABORATE TRICK), but also the right to DECIDE WHAT IS AND ISNT APPROPRIATE and BAN CONTENT FROM THE PUBLIC. We are part of an ELABORATE DECEPTION from CHINA to CONTROL AND SHEEPIFY the NATION, to PROTECT THE CHILDREN. All opposers must HATE CHILDREN, and therefore must be KILLED WITH A LARGE MELONS during the PROSECUTION PARTIES IN SEPTEMBER. Come join our ALIEN SPACE PARTY.

In September 2009, the group Anonymous reawakened, in Operation Didgeridie, in order to protest the policy of Internet censorship, and on 9 September initiated a Distributed Denial-of-service attack against the prime minister's website. As a result of this attack, the site was taken offline for approximately one hour.

On 10 February 2010, the Parliament of Australia's website, www.aph.gov.au, was attacked by Anonymous once again. The attacks included distributed denial of service, black faxes, prank calls and spam emails. The attacks commenced at 12 midnight local time and the website was down for over two days. The attack, named "Operation Titstorm" is reportedly in defiance of the government's banning of small-breasted women and female ejaculation in pornography. The group called for physical media to be distributed to members of the Australian Labor Party as well as assaulting email addresses, phone numbers, and fax numbers with spam and pornographic images that were in the categories to which were going to be filtered by the government's policy.

== Other expanded censorship proposals ==
In a 2012 "Report of the Independent Inquiry into Media and Media Regulation", Raymond Finkelstein argued that standards of "accuracy, fairness, impartiality, integrity, and independence" on the part of the press could only be achieved through government control. He proposed the creation of an independent News Media Council covering all platforms (print, online, radio and television) with the power to order changes to published content, publication of a right of reply by anyone or any organisation that makes a complaint, and the publication of an apology. Refusal to comply could result in the author, media organisation, or blogger being accused of contempt, a trial by a court, and the possibility of the fines and / or prison sentences associated with contempt of court findings.

The proposal would have the effect of converting the code of ethics of the Media, Entertainment and Arts Alliance (MEAA) into laws enforceable by the courts. As a result, small publishers and bloggers may feel coerced into publishing corrections or apologies when they lack the time, energy, or resources to defend themselves in court against a contempt charge.

== See also ==
- Censorship in Australia
- Content-control software
- Internet censorship by country
- Online Safety Amendment (Social Media Minimum Age) Act
- Think of the children
