= MFU =

MFU may refer to:

- Market facing unit, a synonym for line of business
- Ministry of Finance of Ukraine
- Midpeninsula Free University, United States
- Melbourne Free University, Australia
- Mae Fah Luang University, Thailand
- Milli flux unit, a synonym for a millijansky
- Mfuwe Airport, Zambia
