= Freeweb =

Freeweb may refer to:

- Freewebs, now Webs, a free website hosting service
- Project Freeweb, part of the February 2010 Australian cyberattacks, a protest against Australian government proposed internet censorship regulations
