= MissbrauchsOpfer Gegen InternetSperren =

German non-profit organization

- Founded: 1 April 2009; 17 years ago
- Founder: Christian Bahls
- Type: eingetragener Verein
- Location: Rostock, Germany
- Members: unknown
- Website: mogis.info

MissbrauchsOpfer Gegen InternetSperren (MOGIS) (German for "victims of abuse against internet barriers") is a German non-profit organization of victims of child abuse.

== History ==
MOGIS was founded by Christian Bahls (himself a victim of child abuse) on 1 April 2009 in Rostock in reaction to plans by the German Minister for Family Affairs, Ursula von der Leyen, to use domain name block lists to fight against child pornography on the internet. The organization represents victims of child abuse who argue that such block lists are ineffective in reducing child pornography on the internet. They also criticize that those lists, which were planned to be made by the German BKA without any oversight might lead to the establishment of online censorship and that the whole proposal uses victims of child abuse to further a political agenda that would not do anything to help those victims. Similar concerns had been raised in March 2009 regarding use of blacklists for internet censorship in Australia.

They caused a stir in May 2009 when they proved that a survey that saw 92% of Germans in favor of such plans was a result of the way the question was asked and that a survey commissioned by MOGIS with the same institute lead to a 95% opposition amongst those questioned when the question included the fact that the content of those internet sites is still available despite the blocks.

MOGIS was cited in many influential German blogs as well as traditional media outlets and served to strengthen the credibility of those opposing such measures.

== MOGIS and Wikipedia ==
On 15 October 2009 the article on MOGIS was deleted from the German Wikipedia for not meeting the strict notability requirements of the project. This led to widespread criticism in the German blogosphere, where the strict notability criteria of the German Wikipedia have been described by some as "censorship" and has led to news coverage in multiple media outlets discussing those notability requirements. It has also led to a surge of low-amount donations to Wikimedia Deutschland, the German Wikimedia chapter, with comments criticizing the deletion decision.

== Worldwide Day of Genital Autonomy ==
The Worldwide Day of Genital Autonomy (WWDOGA) is an anti-circumcision campaign day initiated by the German "Facharbeitskreis Beschneidungsbetroffener im MOGiS e.V.". It has been held on May 7 every year since 2013.
