= 2Clix Software =

Defunct Australian accounting software developer

2Clix Screenshot (2004)

2Clix Software was a software developer based in Australia.

== History ==
2Clix was founded in 1997 in Australia, but they also had an office in the United Kingdom. The company's flagship product, 2Clix was a business management and accounting suite.

2Clix was awarded a Gold Coast Business award in July 2004.

On 22 October 2007 it was reported that 2Clix has appointed Worrell's solvency and forensic accountants as an administrator. Registered creditors can access details from Worrell's site. Former employees have been made redundant and are registered as creditors to claim their owed entitlements.

Prior to their insolvency and liquidation proceedings, 2Clix management created a new company called Platinum One, intending to relaunch the same 2Clix software, rebranding it Platinum One. After the worldwide controversy in relation to the Whirlpool forum, which saw the name Platinum One heavily associated with 2Clix, the same management team created a new company called Total ERP Solutions, again releasing exactly the same software package in an attempt to rebuild.

Following the collapse of the re-branded product due to the bad publicity, the remaining customer base of 2Clix and the re-branded product Platinum One was sold to Madeurne Pty Ltd in March 2010.

The directors of Madeurne Pty Ltd (Director Maureen Poppins, de facto partner of Dean Mills the previous Director of 2Clix) spent the next 14 months rebuilding the software from the ground up and while they maintained some of the look of 2Clix, claiming that the existing customer base and new customers found this the preferred interface, the back end structure and front end source code was completely replaced.

== Whirlpool controversy ==
On 11 September 2007, Whirlpool announced that its founder, Simon Wright, was being sued by 2Clix for alleged 'Injurious Falsehood', a tort not dissimilar to defamation under Australian law, resulting in "a severe downturn in monthly sales". Specifically, 2Clix claimed that comments on the Whirlpool Forums regarding alleged major issues with the product were 'False and Malicious'. 2Clix "quantifies its loss in income between January 2007 to July 2007 at approximately A$150,000 per month" and was suing for A$150,000 plus interest, plus legal costs. The complaint asked the court for A$150,000 total in the summary of relief, while claiming damages of A$150,000 per month.

While legal experts doubted the ability of 2Clix to win the case from the outset, it could have had major ramifications for website operators and their users. A win for 2Clix could have set a precedent and seriously limited the ability of web users to criticise companies' products and services.

Whirlpool users subsequently began donating money to assist the site in its coming legal battle. Some users claim to have had personally donated more than A$1000 through PayPal and the Managing Director of PIPE Networks personally pledged A$10,000 to support Whirlpool's cause.

On 19 September 2007, 2Clix solicitors, Turnbull & Co, stated that it had received instructions to discontinue the case. On 30 October 2007 the Queensland Ecourts website showed that documents to discontinue the case were received.

A former 2Clix senior employee of eight years said in July 2008 that 2Clix Australia's decision to liquidate was precipitated by the negative press resulting from its failed lawsuit against Whirlpool.

== Action Group ==
In the wake of the Whirlpool controversy, a website was set up to help disaffected users of accounting software supplied by 2Clix.
