= Gary Foley =

Aboriginal Australian activist, academic and actor (born 1950)

Gary Edward Foley
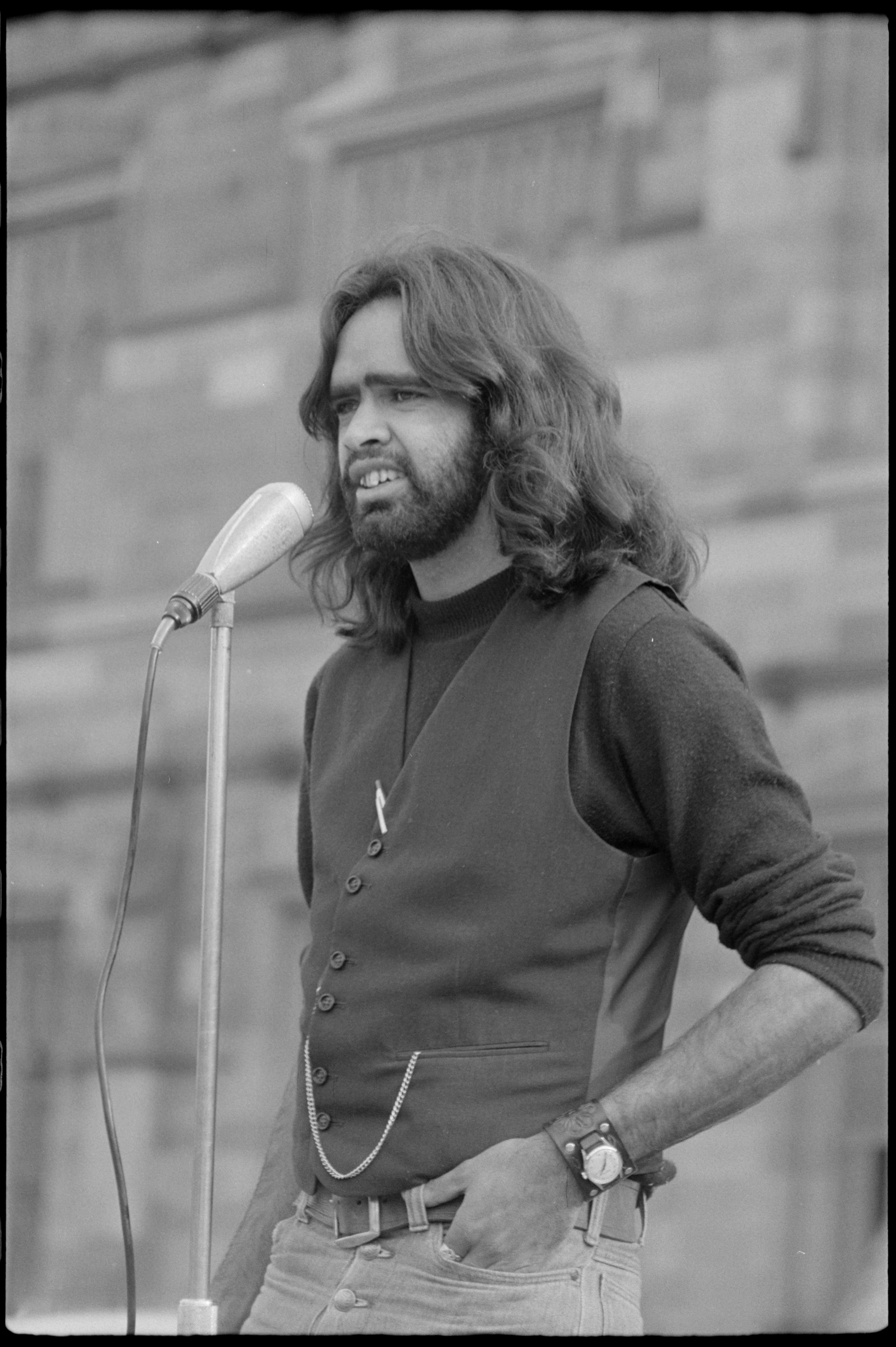
- Foley in 1972, speaking at a black Moratorium (Sydney University)
- Born: 11 May 1950 (age 76); Grafton, New South Wales, Australia
- Occupations: Activist, writer, actor, playwright
- Known for: Founder of the Aboriginal Tent Embassy
- Awards: Red Ochre Award

Gary Edward Foley (born 11 May 1950) is an Aboriginal Australian activist of the Gumbaynggirr people, academic, writer and actor. He is best known for his role in establishing the Aboriginal Tent Embassy in Canberra in 1972 and for establishing an Aboriginal Legal Service in Redfern in the 1970s. He also co-wrote and acted in the first Indigenous Australian stage production, Basically Black.

As of August 2022 Foley is Professor, Moondani Balluk Indigenous Academic Unit, at Victoria University.

== Early years ==
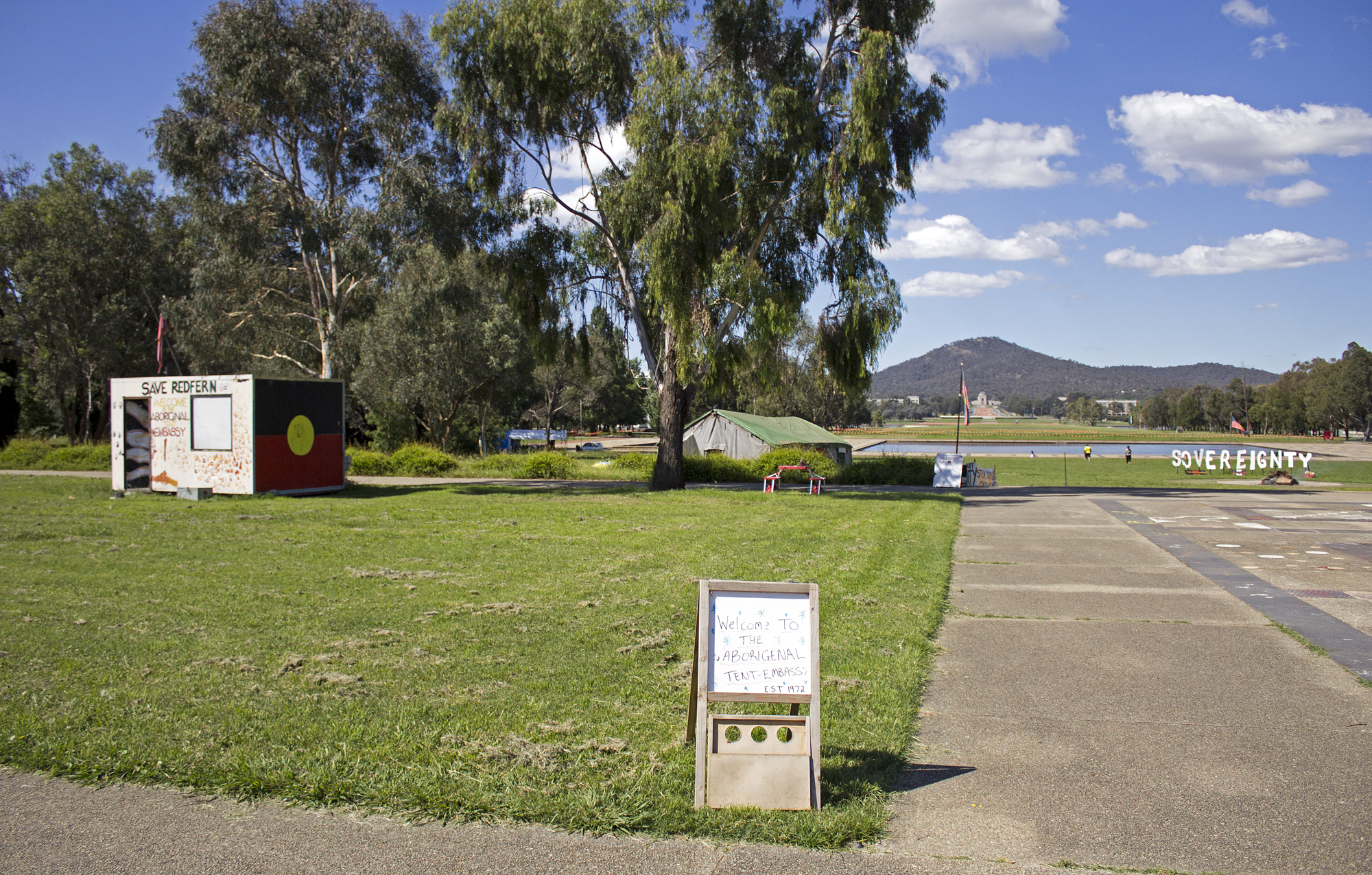
Foley co-founded the Aboriginal Tent Embassy in Canberra

Gary Edward Foley was born in 1950 in Grafton, New South Wales, of Gumbaynggirr descent, and spent much of his childhood in Nambucca Heads. He was expelled from school at the age of 15 and arrived in Redfern aged 17 in around 1967. He worked as an apprentice draughtsman.

== Activism and politics ==
Foley became involved in the "black power" movement active in Redfern soon after arrival. The movement was inspired by the American Black Panther Party.

Foley played an active role in organising protests against the Springboks in 1971 as a result of the Apartheid policies in South Africa. At one stage, Foley and fellow protester Billy Craigie were arrested for wearing Springbok jerseys outside the team motel in Bondi Junction with the police believing they had been stolen when they had been supplied by former Wallabies player Jim Boyce. As a result of the level of protests against the Springboks, an Australian tour by the South African cricket team later that year was cancelled and the two-decade exile of South African sporting teams commenced.

In 1972, Foley was appointed a public relations officer in the Department of Aboriginal Affairs. He was fired from the department after just six weeks, after three warnings, and then secretary Barrie Dexter urged ASIO to spy on Foley.

Foley co-founded the Aboriginal Tent Embassy in 1972 outside Parliament House to highlight Aboriginal disadvantage. The Tent Embassy is still in place despite ongoing controversy and has been nominated for the heritage list. It helped raise the profile of Aboriginal issues prior to the election of the Whitlam government. He was also involved in the formation of the Aboriginal Legal Service in Redfern and the Aboriginal Medical Service in Melbourne and Sydney.

Foley set up the first Aboriginal Information Centre in London. On returning to Australia, he organised protests against the Brisbane Commonwealth Games held in 1982. In 1988, he organised Aboriginal protests against the Australian Bicentenary in 1988 before becoming a consultant to the Royal Commission into Aboriginal Deaths in Custody.

He ran as an independent candidate for the seat of Jagajaga at the 1993 federal election in protest against the closure of Northlands Secondary College.

During the 2018 Victorian state election, Foley endorsed the Victorian Socialists. Foley opposed the voice during the 2023 Indigenous Voice Referendum.

He has described himself as an anarchist.

== Stage, film and TV ==
Foley co-wrote and appeared in Basically Black, the first Aboriginal stage production, in 1972. In 1978, he travelled to Europe as part of a group that took Aboriginal films to the Cannes Film Festival and then to other parts of the continent.

As an actor, Foley's film career includes starring in Philip Noyce's film Backroads (1977) and appearing in Dogs in Space. He also made guest appearances on television shows A Country Practice and The Flying Doctors.

He featured in various documentary series and films, such as "Fair Play" in 2010 (episode 4 of Have you Heard From Johannesburg: Stories From the Global Anti-Apartheid Movement 1948–1990); The Redfern Story (2014), Persons of Interest (2014), an award-winning TV series on ASIO, and the 2002 film The Foundation, which tells of Koori history between 1963 and 1977 in Sydney.

== Academic career ==
Foley completed a Bachelor of Arts degree at the University of Melbourne in 2000, with majors in History and Cultural Studies, before completing a first class honours degree in history in 2002.

In 2001, he was appointed senior curator at Museum Victoria, a position he held until 2005, when he became a lecturer in the Education Faculty of the University of Melbourne. In 2008 he was appointed senior lecturer in history and politics at Moondani Balluk centre at Victoria University.

Foley completed his doctorate at the University of Melbourne in 2013, for which he was awarded the Chancellor's Award for Excellence. He was at some time a senior lecturer at Swinburne University.

As of August 2022 Foley works as a professor at Victoria University.

Foley participated in the Melbourne Free University project.

== Other roles ==
Foley was the first Indigenous director of the Aboriginal Arts Board of the Australia Council between 1983 and 1986 and held other leadership positions in the Aboriginal community.

In 1994 he created the first Aboriginal-owned and -operated website, The Koori History Website, aka Kooriweb.

A 1995 photo portrait of Foley by the artist Destiny Deacon was exhibited in the National Gallery of Victoria in 2020.

== Awards ==
The Australia Council for the Arts is the arts funding and advisory body for the Government of Australia. Since 1993, it has awarded a Red Ochre Award. It is presented to an outstanding Indigenous Australian (Aboriginal Australian or Torres Strait Islander) artist for lifetime achievement.

Year	Nominee / work	Award	Result
2015	Gary Foley	Red Ochre Award	Awarded

In 2021 Foley was awarded the Jerusalem (Al Quds) Peace Prize, which "recognises the inspirational and lifelong contributions of an individual advocating for Palestinian freedom, justice and self-determination".

He was elected a Fellow of the Australian Academy of the Humanities in 2024.

== See also ==
- Anarchism in Australia

== Books ==
- Foley, G.; Schaap, A.; and Howell, E. (eds.) (2014) The Aboriginal Tent Embassy: Sovereignty, Black Power, Land Rights and the State, Routledge: London
- Dexter, Barrie (2015) Pandora's Box: The Council for Aboriginal Affairs 1967–1976. Foley, G. and Howell, E. (eds) Keeaira Press: Southport QLD.
