= Basically Black =

- Genre: Sketch comedy
- Directed by: Nicholas R. Parsons
- Starring: Bob Maza; Gary Foley; Aileen Corpus; Zac Martin; Bindi Williams
- Country of origin: Australia
- Original language: English
- No. of seasons: 1
- No. of episodes: 1

Production
- Executive producer: Alan Morris
- Producer: Bill Munro
- Running time: 28 minutes

Original release
- Network: ABC
- Release: 7 July 1973

Basically Black is a 1973 Australian television comedy program, notable as the first television program written and created by Indigenous Australians. It was produced as one of a series of pilot programs called The Comedy Game.

A single half-hour of sketch comedy, the program was based on a satirical political revue of the same name by the National Black Theatre that had been performed at the Nimrod Theatre in Sydney the previous year.

It premiered on 7 July 1973 as part of a series of ABC Television comedy pilots, The Comedy Game. Some elements of the original script had been censored by Australian Broadcasting Corporation, and it was described by Gary Foley as a "politically watered-down" version of the stage show.

The pilot was deemed a success, but the ABC did not proceed with creating a series from it.

== See also ==
- Black Comedy
