= Helen Coonan =

Australian politician (born 1947)

The Honourable Helen Coonan
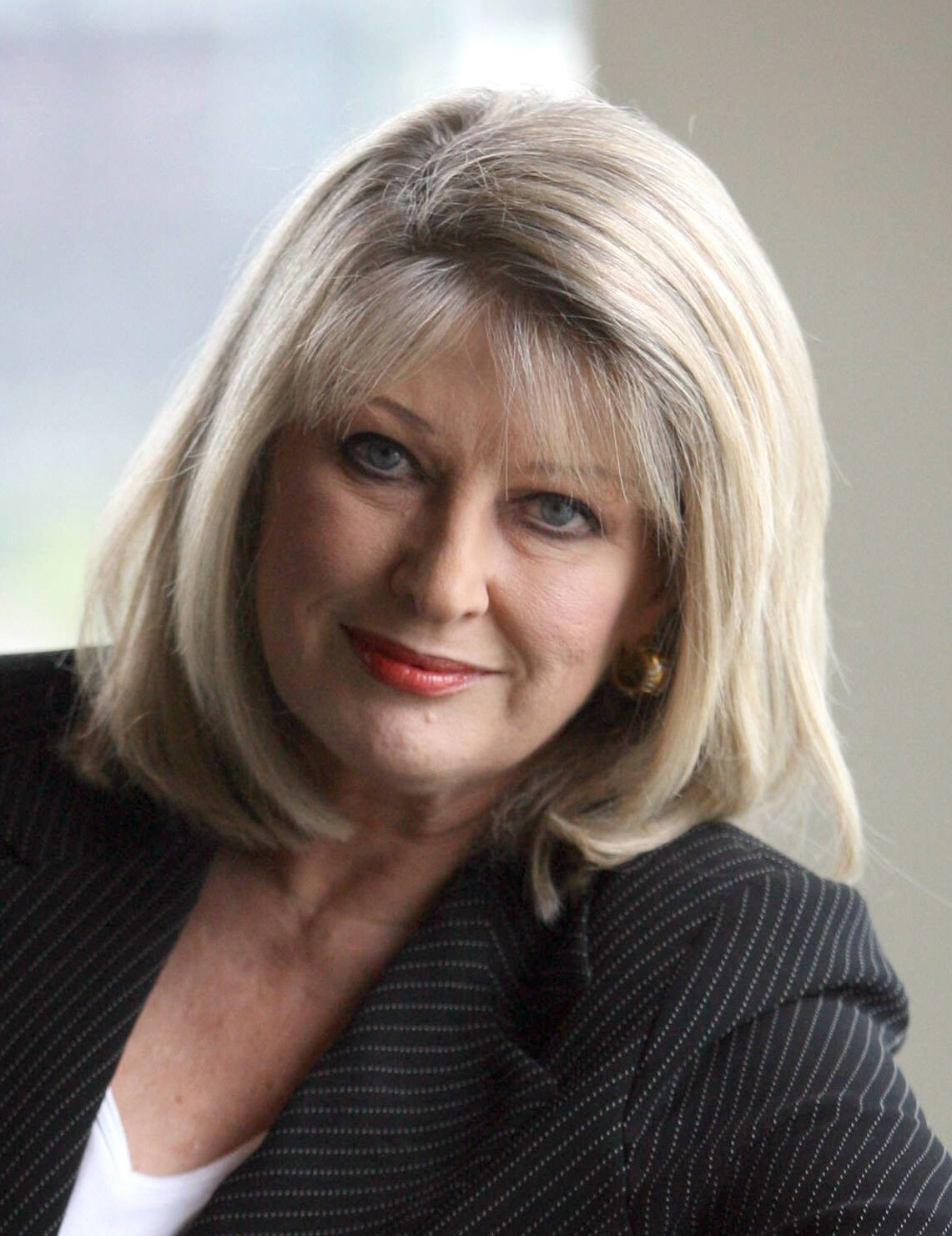
- Official portrait, 2008

Minister for Communications, Information Technology and the Arts
- In office 18 July 2004 – 3 December 2007
- Prime Minister: John Howard
- Preceded by: Daryl Williams
- Succeeded by: Stephen Conroy

Minister for Revenue and Assistant Treasurer
- In office 26 November 2001 – 18 July 2004
- Prime Minister: John Howard
- Preceded by: Rod Kemp
- Succeeded by: Mal Brough

Senator for New South Wales
- In office 1 July 1996 – 22 August 2011
- Succeeded by: Arthur Sinodinos

Personal details
- Born: Helen Lloyd Coonan; 29 October 1947 (age 79) Mangoplah, New South Wales
- Party: Liberal Party of Australia
- Spouse: Andrew Rogers
- Occupation: Barrister/solicitor

Helen Lloyd Coonan (born 29 October 1947) is a former Australian politician who was a Senator for New South Wales from 1996 to 2011, representing the Liberal Party. She was a minister in the Howard government, serving as Minister for Revenue and Assistant Treasurer from 2001 to 2004 and then as Minister for Communications, Information Technology and the Arts from 2004 to 2007.

== Early life ==
Coonan was born in Mangoplah, New South Wales, and attended the Mount Erin convent Catholic boarding school in Wagga Wagga. She later attended the University of Sydney, where she gained a law degree. She was a barrister and solicitor before entering politics. She was chair of the board of governors of the Law Foundation of New South Wales (1991–92).

== Howard government (1996–2007) ==
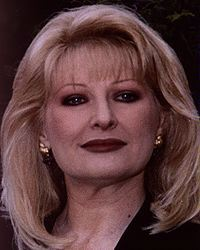
Official portrait, 1996

In 1996, Coonan was elected to the federal Senate as a Liberal senator for New South Wales. She was re-elected in 2001 and appointed Minister for Revenue and Assistant Treasurer (2001–04), making her the first woman to hold an Australian Treasury portfolio since Federation.

As Minister for Revenue and Assistant Treasurer, Coonan appointed David R Vos as the first Inspector-General of Taxation during August 2003; following from the passage of the Inspector-General of Taxation Bill 2002 and providing an adviser to government in the interests of taxpayers.

=== Minister for Communications, Information Technology and the Arts ===
Coonan was appointed Minister for Communications, Information Technology and the Arts, with a seat in the Cabinet, in July 2004. Her portfolio was responsible for overseeing the Australian broadcasting and telecommunications industries as well as the ICT sector and Australia Post. Coonan was also the senior minister responsible for the arts. She became Deputy Leader of the Government in the Senate in January 2006, and was the first female in the Coalition Leadership team remaining in that role until the coalition was defeated at the polls on 24 November 2007.

=== Digital television ===
In July 2004, Australia was in a transitional phase: digital television was broadcast in parallel to the old analogue television signals. The stated plan was full handover to digital by 2008 and shutdown of all analogue television broadcast.

In September 2005, Coonan announced a review of the digital television situation. It was noted that the government had spent $1 billion supporting the change from analogue TV to digital TV. The plan to switch off analogue TV by 2008 in metropolitan areas and by 2011 in regional markets was regarded as unlikely to be workable because the take-up of digital receivers had been poor.

The minister supervised the creation of Digital Australia, a new federally funded government body for coordinating the transition to digital television. Andrew Townend (former COO of Digital UK) was appointed executive director in 2007.

=== Digital radio ===
In October 2005, Coonan released a plan for a staged rollout of Digital Audio Broadcasting using the Eureka-147 technology, starting in metropolitan areas. There was no plan to phase out analogue radio, but a 6-year moratorium on new broadcasting services band licenses was announced.

=== Media ownership ===
Coonan was instrumental in promoting legislative changes to the cross-media and foreign ownership laws in the Broadcasting Services Amendment (Media Ownership) Bill 2006. The changes relaxed restrictions against cross-media ownership or control by a single company.

=== Internet filtering ===
As far back as December 2004, Coonan was under pressure from the religious conservative lobby, in particular Senator Brian Harradine.

In 1999 the government introduced measures to counter the growing problem of offensive material on the Net when it introduced a comprehensive regulatory scheme which banned X-rated and restricted classification, or RC, material. As part of the program, the government also established NetAlert—which Senator Harradine is well aware of—to help children and families use and enjoy the Internet in a safe and responsible way.

Her answer demonstrated that mandatory filtering was under consideration.

Senator Harradine asked about mandatory filtering systems. Under the industry code of practice introduced by the government, all Australian Internet service providers are required to provide content filters for their customers at cost price or below. These tools allow parents to actively control the access their children have to the Internet from the family computer and to have some degree of confidence about the safety of their children online.

Coonan also announced in August 2007 a $189 million package for the NetAlert programme. NetAlert is an Internet service provider (ISP) level Internet content filtering system designed to filter the Internet for "safe" use in Australia. It represented a change from her 2006 policy to allow the ISP to remain a neutral carrier and encourage parents to install filters on their home PCs, commenting at the time that "PC-based filtering remains the most effective way of protecting children from offensive Internet content, as well as other threats that are not addressed by Labor's ISP-filtering proposals." Tom Wood, a 16-year-old schoolboy from Melbourne, took only 30 minutes to find a way to bypass the expensive filtering system. An additional filter was made available shortly after, which Wood cracked within 40 minutes.

== Opposition (2007–11) ==
Following the Liberal/National Coalition's defeat at the 2007 federal election and Brendan Nelson's election as Leader of the Liberal Party, Coonan was replaced as Deputy Leader of Coalition in the Senate by Senator Eric Abetz. She became the Shadow Minister for Human Services, shadowing the Manager of Government Business in the Senate and Minister for Human Services, Senator Joe Ludwig. When Malcolm Turnbull defeated Brendan Nelson in a leadership ballot in September 2008, Coonan was appointed Manager of Opposition Business in the Senate and was elevated to the prestigious position of Shadow Minister for Foreign Affairs. She was the first woman to shadow the portfolio. Following Deputy Leader Julie Bishop's resignation from the Shadow Treasury portfolio in February 2009, Coonan was moved into Finance, Competition Policy and Deregulation, which had been vacated by Joe Hockey, who picked up the Shadow Treasury role. With the increased responsibility of Finance, Coonan relinquished her position of Manager of Opposition Business in the Senate to Opposition Whip, Senator Stephen Parry.

On 18 August 2011, Coonan informed the Senate in a speech that she would resign on 22 August.

== Post-parliamentary career ==
Coonan was appointed as a non-executive director of gaming company Crown Limited in 2011. She is also a member of the advisory council of investment bank J.P. Morgan & Co., a trustee of the Sydney Opera House Trust, chair of the Conservation Council of the Opera House Trust, co-chair of GRACosway and a non-executive director of Obesity Australia Limited. On 1 November 2018 she commenced her role as chair of the Australian Financial Complaints Authority, while in July 2019 she took over as chair of the Minerals Council of Australia.

Coonan was a regular presenter on The Cabinet on Sky News Australia.

Political offices
Ministry created	Minister for Revenue; 2001–2004	Succeeded by Mal Brough
Preceded by Rod Kemp	Assistant Treasurer; 2001–2004	Succeeded by Mal Brough
Preceded by Daryl Williams	Minister for Communications, Information Technology and the Arts; 2004–2007	Succeeded by Stephen Conroy
