= Stephen Conroy =

Australian former politician (born 1963)

The Honourable Stephen Conroy
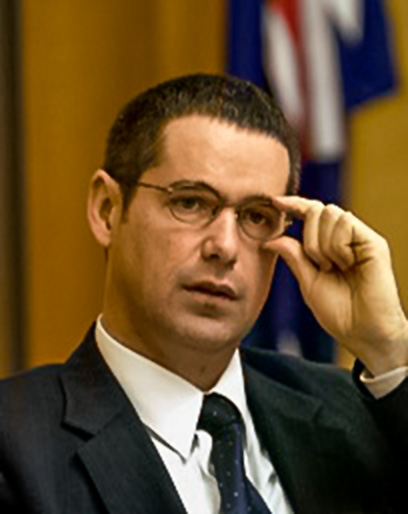
- Conroy in 2004

Deputy Leader of The Opposition in The Senate
- In office 18 September 2013 – 30 September 2016
- Leader: Penny Wong
- Preceded by: George Brandis
- Succeeded by: Don Farrell

Leader of the Government in the Senate
- In office 4 February 2013 – 26 June 2013
- Preceded by: Christopher Evans
- Succeeded by: Penny Wong

Minister for Broadband, Communications and the Digital Economy
- In office 3 December 2007 – 1 July 2013
- Prime Minister: Kevin Rudd; Julia Gillard
- Preceded by: Helen Coonan
- Succeeded by: Anthony Albanese

Senator for Victoria
- In office 30 April 1996 – 30 September 2016
- Preceded by: Gareth Evans
- Succeeded by: Kimberley Kitching

Personal details
- Born: 18 January 1963 (age 63) Ely, Cambridgeshire, England
- Party: Labor
- Spouse: Paula Benson
- Children: 1
- Education: Australian National University

Stephen Michael Conroy (born 18 January 1963) is an Australian former politician who was an Australian Labor Party member of the Senate from 1996 to 2016, representing the state of Victoria. He served as a minister in the Rudd and Gillard governments. He resigned from the Senate in September 2016. He has since worked as a lobbyist, political commentator and soccer administrator.

== Early life ==
Conroy was born in Ely, Cambridgeshire in the United Kingdom. His parents both worked at an air force base, where his mother Jean worked as a radar technician and his father Bill as a sergeant. In December 1973 the Conroys moved to Canberra, Australia, where he attended Daramalan College. He obtained a Bachelor of Economics at the Australian National University in Canberra. His involvement in student politics was minimal, although he helped organise a rally against student fees.

== Politics ==
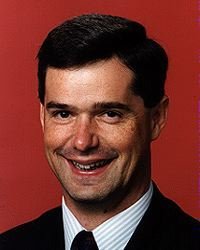
Official portrait, 1996

After university, Conroy worked as an advisor to Ros Kelly and Barry Jones. He moved to Melbourne to pursue a political career where he met Robert Ray, and served for a time as Superannuation Officer with the Transport Workers Union and as a City of Footscray councillor. He was appointed to the Senate in 1996 when Gareth Evans resigned to contest a seat in the Lower House. In October 1998, Conroy joined the Opposition Shadow Ministry and in 2001 became Deputy Opposition Leader in the Senate. He was Shadow Minister for Trade, Corporate Governance and Financial Services from 2003 to 2004, and became Shadow Minister for Communications and Information Technology in October 2004.

Conroy is a leading member of the Labor Right and was criticised in early 2006 by members of the Labor Left and Simon Crean for working for the replacement of several long-serving MPs with new members, including Bill Shorten, Richard Marles, Mark Dreyfus, Nathan Murphy and Matt Carrick. After Simon Crean's win in the Hotham pre-selection, where Conroy supported Martin Pakula for the position, Crean attacked Conroy repeatedly, calling on him to resign his position as Deputy Leader of the Opposition in the Senate.

In April 2009, Conroy faced criticism after he made comments disparaging the ISP iiNet's defence in a Federal Court case against a number of film studios and Channel Seven. Opposition spokesmen described the comments as prejudicial. After iiNet won, Conroy said it was disappointing the two sides had ended up in court. In February 2010, he admitted using his influence to have a former Labor politician Mike Kaiser, take the position of Government Relations and External Affairs Executive with the National Broadband Network. Kaiser was previously forced to retire from the Labor party due to electoral fraud. Also in February 2010, he was reported to have spent some time while on holiday with Kerry Stokes weeks before cutting licence fees that are charged to free-to-air networks, including Stokes' broadcasting Seven Network.

In June 2010, Conroy was criticised by SAGE-AU for "misinformation that verged on fear-mongering" when he suggested Google street view cars could have captured internet banking details in their recording of wireless network traffic, as these are generally exchanged over secure HTTPS connections. In March 2013, he introduced six media reform bills, one of which would have been the establishment of a Public Interest Media Advocate, a government organisation set up to regulate the previously self-regulated media in Australia. After announcing there would be no discussion over the bills, and that they would be passed or failed as a package, he backed down, allowing negotiation with parties who held the balance of power in the senate. The content of the bills were largely condemned by media. Ultimately, only two of the six bills passed, and at that the least controversial ones. Should he have introduced the 7 bills, the controversy may have been surpassed.

=== Portfolio ===
Conroy was Minister for Broadband, Communications and the Digital Economy in the First Rudd, First Gillard and Second Gillard Ministries. The NBN roll out was dogged with delay and cost blowouts in his time as minister. In that role, he was responsible for internet censorship, the National Broadband Network, and the proposed switch to digital television as a complete replacement for analogue. In May 2010 he was appointed as a founding member to a new United Nations commission, the Broadband Commission for Digital Development.

==== Internet censorship ====
Conroy faced severe criticism over his Internet censorship policies from various groups. While initially promoted as a way to block child sexual abuse, the censorship policy has been extended to include legal material traditionally refused classification by the Office of Film and Literature Classification (now known as the Australian Classification Board), including sites depicting drug use, crime, sex, cruelty, violence or "revolting and abhorrent phenomena" that "offend against the standards of morality". On 19 March 2009 it was reported that ACMA's blacklist of banned sites had been leaked online, and had been published by WikiLeaks. About half of the list was child sexual abuse related; the remainder included sites dealing with legal porn, online gambling, euthanasia, Christianity and fringe religions; sites belonging to a tour operator, dentist and animal carers were also listed. Conroy described the leak and publication of the blacklist as "grossly irresponsible" and that it undermined efforts to improve "cyber safety". In June 2009 he was named "Internet villain of the year" at the 11th annual Internet industry awards in the UK, for "individuals or organisations that have upset the Internet industry and hampered its development – those whom the industry loves to hate."

In December 2009 "Internet pranksters" registered the domain name stephenconroy.com.au which was swiftly removed by auDA, raising concerns about auDA's political neutrality and the further potential for suppression of political speech after the proposed mandatory Internet filter is legislated.

In May 2010, Conroy was accused of deliberately misrepresenting iiNet's position with regards to the new internet filter. His department could also not say where he obtained other figures from, such as how he believes that 85% of ISPs support the new filter.

In September 2012 Conroy stated:

"The regulation of telecommunications powers in Australia is exclusively federal. That means I am in charge of spectrum auctions, and if I say to everyone in this room 'if you want to bid in our spectrum auction you'd better wear red underpants on your head', I've got some news for you. You'll be wearing them on your head ... I have unfettered legal power."

== Resignation from Parliament ==
Stephen Conroy foreshadowed his resignation from parliament in a tabled speech on 15 September 2016; he resigned on 30 September 2016.

On 25 October, a joint sitting of the Victorian Parliament appointed Kimberley Kitching as his replacement.

== Career after politics ==
In December 2016 it was announced that Conroy would be head of a new industry body for the gambling industry, Responsible Wagering Australia, backed by bookmakers CrownBet, Sportsbet, Betfair, Unibet and Bet365. In 2017, he joined Sky News Australia as a political commentator.

In 2023 Conroy became the Independent Chairman of the Australian Professional Leagues, the organisation responsible for administration of the A-Leagues professional soccer competitions.

== Political positions ==
Conroy is a Roman Catholic and socially conservative. While he voted against the abortion drug RU486 in a conscience vote, he has claimed not to have taken a conservative position on all issues:

"I think the point I made was that while I would prefer there to be a parliamentary framework for the RU486, I think it was, debate, if the actual issue was before Parliament I would probably vote for the distribution of the pill. People often say, oh no Steve's a conservative Catholic, but they won't ever find on my voting record something that backs that up. I voted against the Northern Territory's euthanasia legislation. I voted for some of the cloning debate. So I voted in, I like to consider the issues on their merits and I voted what some would characterise as conservatively and some would characterise as progressively on a number of issues."

When a bill seeking to legalise same-sex marriage was debated by the Senate in 2012, Conroy was one of 11 Labor Senators to vote against the legislation. By the time of Conroy's resignation, Labor Party policy supported same-sex marriage and bound its MPs to vote in favour of legislation from the end of the 2016–19 parliamentary term.

== Personal life ==
Conroy and his wife, Paula Benson, have one daughter.

He was a national volleyball representative as a teenager and was the President of Volleyball Victoria from 2004 to 2019.

== See also ==
- First Rudd Ministry
- First Gillard Ministry
- Second Gillard Ministry

Political offices
Preceded by Helen Coonan	Minister for Broadband, Communications and the Digital Economy; 2007–2013	Succeeded by Anthony Albanese
Party political offices
Preceded by Chris Evans	Leader of the Australian Labor Party in the Senate; 2013	Succeeded by Penny Wong
