= Whirlpool (website) =

Australian website

Whirlpool.net.au
- Website type: Internet forum
- Available in: English
- Owners: Simon Wright, Phil Sweeney
- Creator: Simon Wright
- Revenue: Google AdSense
- Website: whirlpool.net.au
- Registration: Free
- Launched: December 1998
- Current status: Active
- Written in: CFML, JavaScript

Whirlpool is an independent Australian website founded in 1998. Since then, it has grown significantly and has over 931,623 registered accounts. Primarily a discussion forum, some extra functionality such as Broadband Choice was included, although this functionality has been removed from the site.

== History ==
Whirlpool began as a community resource for users of Telstra's BigPond cable Internet service, the name Whirlpool being a parody of BigPond. However, it soon expanded to cover Optus' Optus@Home (now known as OptusNet) cable internet service, ADSL-based services, and other forms of broadband Internet service providers (ISPs) in Australia, as they became available.

=== 2Clix controversy ===
On 11 September 2007, it was announced that 2Clix Software was commencing legal action against Whirlpool founder Simon Wright for posts made by users in the Whirlpool forums that 2Clix claimed were "false and malicious". 2Clix claimed it had lost approximately A$150,000 income per month between January and July 2007 and sued for that amount plus legal costs. Whirlpool users responded immediately by sending PayPal donations to assist with the site's legal costs, with some users claiming they had sent donations exceeding A$1,000. The co-founder of PIPE Networks personally pledged a donation of A$10,000 towards the cause.

On 19 September 2007, solicitors for 2Clix stated that they had received instructions to discontinue the case. 2Clix entered voluntary liquidation in late 2007 and its director was subsequently declared bankrupt.

== Broadband Choice ==
Broadband Choice allowed a user to find options available to them and to filter them by features such as price, speed and usage limits. In most cases, details about ISPs and their plans were maintained by staff of each ISP, which were then editorially approved by Whirlpool.

Broadband Choice was retired on 29 June 2015 with the link redirecting to a page outlining the reasons for closure.

== Whirlpool forums ==
The primary purpose of the forums is to provide a venue in which to discuss broadband and related areas (such as networking). Representatives from many Australian service providers, hardware vendors and merchants use Whirlpool as a strictly non-official support and communication channel.

Whirlpool uses custom forum software. Some features present on other message boards such as signatures, avatars and in-line images are not provided. When threads and posts are deleted or moved, placeholders are left allowing users to see the alleged moderation that has occurred. This is different from other common forum software where deleted material may simply disappear from view.

The forum also has areas for discussing more general topics, known as "lounges". Some of them are only available to long-standing or highly active members of the community.

== Knowledge base ==
Whirlpool has its own Wiki. It is an accumulation of information put together by forum users in "sticky threads" over time, with the hope of cutting down forum clutter, while also allowing more collaborative content development. It includes information that is difficult to find aggregated in one place elsewhere, such as the Australian Exchange Guide (a guide to the locations of Australian telephone exchanges), a list of Australian computer shops and a list of Australian VoIP providers.

== History ==
Simon Wright, as founder and main developer, developed the site in CFML. Phil Sweeney assists by writing news and by keeping Broadband Choice updated, when it was online.

Previously, Whirlpool existed with no revenue stream. Unlike many forums, Whirlpool had no banners or paid advertising. However, in 2008, the owner began using Google AdSense in pages that result from Google searches, for users who are not logged in.

Most day-to-day administrative tasks are conducted by a team of unpaid volunteer members, who have been given varying degrees of moderation privileges in the forums.

== Awards ==
In its first few years, Whirlpool was nominated for several awards:

- Best Technology Media Website, IT Journalism Awards
  - Nominated, 2003
  - Winner, 2004
  - Winner, 2005
  - Finalist, 2006
- Best Technology Title, IT Journalism Awards
  - Winner, 2004

== See also ==
- List of Internet forums
