= Digital Liberty Coalition =

Digital rights advocacy group in Australia

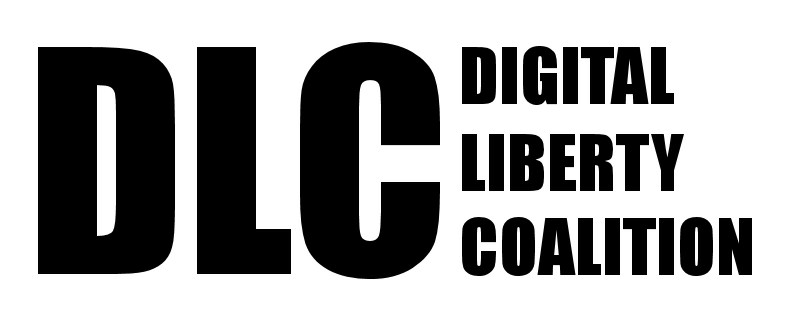
The Digital Liberty Coalition Logo

The Digital Liberty Coalition (DLC) is an Australian nonprofit organisation that emerged from the public backlash against the Australian government's plans to implement compulsory ISP-level filtering of internet content (cf. proposed compulsory filtering scheme). It consists of various grassroots movements and held its first national rally on 1 November 2008, in several Australian state capitals.

According to its website, the Digital Liberty Coalition seeks to promote free speech online, and to challenge the constitutional validity of legislative infringements on civil liberties.
