= Melbourne Free University =

The Melbourne Free University (MFU) is an alternative university that was founded in Melbourne in 2010 in response to Australia's increasingly outcome-oriented education system.

== Principles ==
The motto of Melbourne Free University is "Think. Discuss. Act".

The Melbourne Free University operates according to a manifesto, published on its website.

- The Melbourne Free University combines the academic rigour of a traditional university with the open discussions of a philosophical salon.
- The Melbourne Free University stands for radical equality: the a priori belief in universal equality and possibilities of emancipation.
- The Melbourne Free University is free and accessible. It remains politically and economically autonomous from political parties and organisations, government, private bodies, universities and NGOs.
- The Melbourne Free University is based on the belief that people have the responsibility to seek and engage with knowledge. Learning is an act of will and empowerment.
- The Melbourne Free University is an alternative to the exclusive and outcome orientated education sector, enabling the pursuit of knowledge for its own sake, and thereby freedom.

Melbourne Free University's motto is "Think. Discuss. Act."

== Founders ==
Melbourne Free University was co-founded by three colleagues from La Trobe University: Dr. Gerhard Hoffstaedter, a social anthropologist; Dr. Aurelien Mondon, a researcher in politics; and Jasmine-Kim Westendorf, a PhD candidate in politics.

== Convenors ==
As of 2023, the convenors include Emily Foley, Gerald Roche, JJ, Jem, and co-founder Jasmine Westendorf.

== Past Courses ==
For its first semester in 2010, the Melbourne Free University offered four seminars.

MFU's second semester in August 2010 was divided into four 6-week courses.

The first, titled Australian Identities?, was coordinated by Aurelien Mondon. Lecturers and speakers included Aurelien Mondon, Russell Marks, Pamela Curr, Gary Foley and Malcolm Farnsworth.

The second course ran in parallel and was titled Sustainability and Permaculture. It was coordinated by Jasmine-Kim Westendorf. Lecturers and speakers included Ruby Murray, Andrew Foran, Christian Monahan, Susannah Powell, Catherine Johnston and Jodi Newcombe.

The third course, which started on 29 September 2010, was titled I (heart) Philosophy. Coordinated by Jasmine-Kim Westendorf and Gerhard Hoffstaedter, lecturers and speakers include Aurelien Mondon, Miriam Bankovsky, Christopher Cordner, Justin Clemens, Michael Elligate, and Gregory McCormick.

The fourth course, which started on 30 September 2010, was titled The Asia-Pacific and Us: Australia in the Region. Coordinated by Gerhard Hoffstaedter and Michael Webber, lecturers and speakers included Jasmine-Kim Westendorf, Deb Chapman, Gerhard Hoffstaedter, Andrew Kingsford and Michael Webber.

In the summer of 2011–2012, the MFU cooperated with Occupy Melbourne in a course at City Square on issues relating to the global Occupy movement.

== Recordings and publications ==
Recordings of lectures appear on Melbourne Free University's website.

Several articles have been published following the lectures given at the Melbourne Free University.

Aurélien Mondon, Education is not just about getting a job, The Age, 4 June 2010.

Aurélien Mondon, Do people really want what politicians are offering?, The National Times, 8 July 2010.

Aurélien Mondon, A Free University for Melbourne, Arena Magazine, No.106, July 2010.

Gerhard Hoffstaedter, Hub of turmoil thrives in Asia, The Canberra Times, 1 July 2010,

Russell Marks, Labor no longer party of progressive nationalism, 19 August 2010

Gerhard Hoffstaedter, People must be able to feel at home here, 1 October 2010

== Venues ==
Lectures have been held at several Melbourne venues:

- Dexter Cafe, 123 Queens Parade, Clifton Hill VIC
- North Carlton Railway Station Neighbourhood House, 20 Solly Avenue, North Carlton VIC
- City Square, cnr Swanston & Collins Street, Melbourne VIC
- The Red Wheelbarrow Bookshop, 105 Lygon Street, Brunswick East VIC
- The Alderman (upstairs gallery) 134 Lygon Street, Brunswick East VIC
