= Spy Kids (soundtrack) =

Spy Kids (Music from the Dimension Motion Picture)

Soundtrack album by various artists
- Released: April 10, 2001
- Recorded: 2000–2001
- Genres: Film soundtrack; rock; pop
- Length: 31:03
- Labels: Gold Circle Records; Dimension Music
- Producer: Robert Rodriguez

Spy Kids (Music from the Dimension Motion Picture) is the soundtrack album to the 2001 film Spy Kids directed by Robert Rodriguez. The album featured original score cues composed by an assortment of musicians, along with the contributions from the bands Los Lobos and Fonda and actor Alan Cumming. The album was released through Gold Circle Records and Dimension Music on April 10, 2001.

== Development ==
Before filming began production, Rodriguez asked Danny Elfman to write "Floop's Song (Cruel World)" which was performed onscreen by Alan Cumming, while Chris Boardman came onboard to adapt Elfman's melody to be used in the rest of the film. For the rest of the score, Rodriguez went to Media Ventures and collaborated with Hans Zimmer's protégés, Harry Gregson-Williams, Gavin Greenaway and Heitor Pereira, to write much of the cues.

Furthermore, Rodriguez recruited John Debney "to lend some cohesiveness to what was a pastiche of musical styles". He worked on the score for a week and came with re-arrangements of Elfman's theme and new materials to supplement the rest of the score. Debney also did a similar thing adapting Elfman's theme for Heartbreakers which also released the same year as Spy Kids.

Rodriguez and his brother Marcel then worked with the Mariachi rock band Los Lobos to write original source music. The band also covered the Tito Puente song, "Oye Como Va" which was adapted as "Oye Como Spy" by David Garza and Rodriguez. The Los Angeles indie pop band Fonda, performed the closing theme "Spy Kids (Save the World)". Despite the involvement of multiple composers, the compilation of the album involved only 19 tracks running for 31-minutes. This was primarily due to the licensing and copyrights leading to several cues being omitted from the final album.

== Reception ==
Christian Clemmensen of Filmtracks assigned a three-star rating and wrote "Parts of the album will rock your room with energy, but the somewhat incongruous styles of each involved composer will leave you with a fading, unenthusiastic memory of the music once the fun stops." Roy Donga of Music from the Movies gave three-and-a-half out of five and described it as an "all round highly entertaining album." Dan Goldwasser of Soundtrack.Net rated four out of five, calling it "a highly enjoyable album that worked in spite of having what would seem to be too many people working on it."

Jonathan Broxton of Movie Music UK wrote "whatever merits or demerits are decided, Elfman, Debney, Gregson-Williams and the gang have certainly written an enjoyable hybrid for Spy Kids. Ignoring the purely artistic elements of the score’s creation, the ultimate accolade one can bestow upon Spy Kids is that it works – enhancing the action and creating a mood of light-hearted enjoyment." Lael Loewenstein of Variety wrote "kid-friendly tone is maintained through musical selections, including tracks by Danny Elfman, Los Lobos and Rodriguez."

Annelise Cooper of Bustle called the score "so-classic-it's-a-joke"; for the same website, Mary Grace Garis noted the "Floop's Song" being "pretty much something dug out of Danny Elfman's waste basket." Diego Pineda Pacheco of Collider wrote "The team that worked on the music is so vast that you'd expect the result to be a jumbled mess, but nothing could be farther from the truth. Not only are all the songs cohesive: They're also a ton of fun to listen to, either by themselves or in accompaniment with the undeniably bombastic movie." Sam Scott of Looper noted that Los Lobos' main theme was "a perfect mission statement for Rodriguez's reimagining of the spy genre."

== Track listing ==
No.	Title	Writer(s)	Artist(s)	Length
1.	"Cortez Family"	Gavin Greenaway; Heitor Pereira; Harry Gregson-Williams		1:39
2.	"My Parents Are Spies"	Danny Elfman		2:09
3.	"Spy Wedding"	Los Lobos; Robert Rodriguez		2:11
4.	"Spy Kids Demonstration"	John Debney; R. Rodriguez; Marcel Rodriguez		1:06
5.	"Parents on Mission"	Debney; Elfman; Greenaway; Pereira		1:17
6.	"Kids Escape House"	Greenaway; Pereira		3:14
7.	"Pod Chase"	Debney; Elfman; Gregson-Williams		1:38
8.	"The Safehouse"	Debney; Elfman		0:47
9.	"The Third Brain"	Debney; R. Rodriguez; M. Rodriguez		1:00
10.	"Buddy Pack Escape"	Elfman		1:39
11.	"Oye Como Spy"	Davíd Garza; Tito Puente; R. Rodriguez	Los Lobos	2:59
12.	"Floop's Song (Cruel World)"	Elfman	Alan Cumming	0:59
13.	"Spy Go Round"	Greenaway; Pereira; M. Rodriguez		2:11
14.	"Minion"	Chris Boardman; Greenaway; Pereira; R. Rodriguez		1:03
15.	"Sneaking Around Machetes"	Elfman		0:35
16.	"The Spy Plane"	Debney; Elfman		1:29
17.	"Floop's Castle"	Boardman		1:29
18.	"Final Family Theme"	Gregson-Williams		1:44
19.	"Spy Kids (Save the World)"	Emily Cook; David Klotz; Dave Newton	Fonda	2:20

== Personnel ==
Credits adapted from liner notes:

- Album producers – Robert Rodriguez
- Orchestrators – Bruce Fowler, Don Nemitz, John Debney, Ladd McIntosh
- Conductors – John Debney, Ladd McIntosh
- Contractor – Janet Ketchum
- Recording and mixing – Bob Levy, Dann Thompson
- Mastering – David Mitson
- Music editor – Stephanie Lowry
- Music coordinators – Joe Rangel, Michael Mason, Rachel Levy
- Executive producers – Randy Gerston, Randy Spendlove
- Art direction – Peggy Zier
- A&R – Amy Rosen

== Accolades ==
Award	Category	Recipient	Result
ALMA Award	Outstanding Song in a Motion Picture Soundtrack	Los Lobos (for the song "Oye Como Spy")	Nominated
ASCAP Film and Television Music Awards	Top Box Office Films	John Debney	Won

== Legacy ==
Having composed two songs for the film, Rodriguez then composed the complete score for its sequels: The Island of Lost Dreams (2002) with John Debney, 3-D: Game Over (2003) by solely himself and All the Time in the World (2011) by Carl Thiel.
