= Spy Kids =

Media franchise

- Official film series logo
- Created by: Robert Rodriguez
- Original work: Spy Kids (2001)
- Owners: Troublemaker Studios, Spyglass Media Group and Paramount Pictures (through Miramax, Dimension Films, The Weinstein Company, Skydance Media and Lantern Entertainment)
- Years: 2001–present

Print publications
- Books: List of books
- Comics: List of comics

Films and television
- Films: Spy Kids (2001); Spy Kids 2: The Island of Lost Dreams (2002); Spy Kids 3-D: Game Over (2003); Spy Kids: All the Time in the World (2011); Spy Kids: Armageddon (2023)
- Animated series: Spy Kids: Mission Critical (2018)

Miscellaneous
- Total box office: $550.3 million

Spy Kids is an American media franchise centered on a series of five spy action comedy films created by Robert Rodriguez. The plot follows two adventurous siblings, who discover that their respective parents are spies and become involved in an espionage organization when their parents go missing.

== Background ==
=== Influences ===
Spy Kids was influenced by elements of both James Bond and family films. The films also exhibit Latin themes, as Rodriguez is of Mexican descent. Rodriguez has stated that the first film was "a fusion of Willy Wonka and James Bond", while the sequel was the "Mysterious Island and James Bond mix".

The spy organization in the film series, dubbed the OSS. These initials are from the Office of Strategic Services, a former U.S. intelligence organization during World War II which later evolved into the CIA. The character Donnagon Giggles was named after William Joseph Donovan, the director of the original OSS. The initials in the Spy Kids canon are unspecified on screen, but they supposedly stand for the Organization of Super Spies.

=== Technical innovations ===
The first two films were shot with High Definition digital video, with parts of the third film using an anaglyphic process to create the 3-D effect. Audiences were given red/blue 3D glasses with their tickets in movie theatres. Four sets of these glasses were also included in the DVD release. The third film was used as a test for a special Texas Instruments digital projector which can project polarized 3D, which does not require the red-blue lenses, later reused for The Adventures of Sharkboy and Lavagirl in 3-D (2005).

== Films ==
Film	U.S. release date	Director	Screenwriter(s)	Producers
Spy Kids	March 30, 2001	Robert Rodriguez	Robert Rodriguez	Robert Rodriguez & Elizabeth Avellán
Spy Kids 2: The Island of Lost Dreams	August 7, 2002	Robert Rodriguez	Robert Rodriguez	Robert Rodriguez & Elizabeth Avellán
Spy Kids 3-D: Game Over	July 25, 2003	Robert Rodriguez	Robert Rodriguez	Robert Rodriguez & Elizabeth Avellán
Spy Kids: All the Time in the World	August 19, 2011	Robert Rodriguez	Robert Rodriguez	Robert Rodriguez & Elizabeth Avellán
Spy Kids: Armageddon	September 22, 2023	Robert Rodriguez	Racer Max & Robert Rodriguez	Racer Max, Don Granger, Dana Goldberg, David Ellison, Robert Rodriguez & Elizabeth Avellán

=== Spy Kids (2001) ===
After retiring from espionage for 10 years, Gregorio and Ingrid (Antonio Banderas and Carla Gugino) are pulled back into duty for their important assignment despite the fact they were out of practice and were captured. Their two children, Carmen and Juni (Alexa Vega and Daryl Sabara), stay with their first uncle Felix Gumm (Cheech Marin) and discover the truth of their parents' past, which they had neglected to tell them because they were afraid that if they knew, they would picture danger at every corner; and decide to rescue them. On their first mission, Carmen and Juni manage to bring around their estranged uncle, Isador "Machete" Cortez (Danny Trejo), a genius gadget inventor and Juni helps to redeem a kids' TV show host named Fegan Floop (Alan Cumming). Together, Carmen and Juni thwart the plan of Floop's notorious second in-command Alexander Minion (Tony Shalhoub) to develop an army of androids resembling young children (including Carmen and Juni themselves) for a mastermind named Mr. Lisp (Robert Patrick) and his partner Ms. Gradenko (Teri Hatcher). The robots based on Carmen and Juni became part of Floop's own TV show. The film was shot on location in Austin, Texas and Latin America.

=== Spy Kids 2: The Island of Lost Dreams (2002) ===
As agents of the OSS, Carmen and Juni try to save the daughter (Taylor Momsen) of the President of the United States (Christopher McDonald) while facing a particularly hard competition with Gary and Gerti Giggles (Matt O'Leary and Emily Osment), the two children of a double-dealing agent Donnagon Giggles (Mike Judge), whom Carmen and Juni helped to rescue them from the first film. Juni gets fired from the OSS after fighting with Gary over a smaller version of the Transmooker, a device that can shut off all of the electronic devices even though it was Gary who started the fight. Juni loses his spot for the best Spy Kid of The Year award, while Donnagon plans to steal the Transmooker to take over the world. On their second mission, Carmen and Juni follow the trail to the mysterious island of Leeke Leeke which is home to Romero (Steve Buscemi), an eccentric scientist who attempted to create genetically miniaturized animals, but instead wounded up with his island inhabited by mutant monsters. Eventually, Donnagon is fired and Gary is suspended, and the Transmooker is destroyed. Juni is offered his job back, but in order to take a break from the OSS, he retires to begin his own private eye agency.

=== Spy Kids 3D: Game Over (2003) ===
After retiring from the OSS, Juni is thrust back into service when an evil mastermind named Sebastian "The Toymaker" (Sylvester Stallone) creates a fictional video game called Game Over, which hypnotizes its users. Carmen was sent on a mission to disable the game, but disappeared on Level 4. With the help of his maternal grandfather, Valentin Avellan (Ricardo Montalban), who uses a wheelchair, Juni is sent after Carmen and helps her to disable the game in order to save the world. It is revealed that Sebastian was the one who disabled Valentin in the first place. Instead of avenging his ex-partner, Valentin forgives Sebastian who is redeemed.

=== Spy Kids: All the Time in the World (2011) ===
The OSS has become the world's top spy agency, while the Spy Kids department has become defunct. Marissa (Jessica Alba), a retired spy, is thrown back into the action along with her two stepchildren, Rebecca and Cecil (Rowan Blanchard and Mason Cook), when a maniacal Timekeeper (Jeremy Piven) attempts to take over the world. In order to save the world, Rebecca and Cecil must team up with Marissa.

=== Spy Kids: Armageddon (2023) ===
The fifth installment titled Spy Kids: Armageddon, served as a relaunch of the franchise, involves a plot that centers on a multicultural family. Robert Rodriguez is again writer/director, while the project is a joint-venture production between Skydance Media and Spyglass Media Group. The film was released on Netflix, making it the second Spy Kids project produced for the platform. Gina Rodriguez, Zachary Levi, Everly Carganilla and Connor Esterson were set to star, along with Billy Magnussen and D. J. Cotrona. The plotline for the film: "When the children of the world's greatest secret agents unwittingly help a powerful Game Developer unleash a computer virus that gives him control of all technology, they must become spies themselves to save their parents and the world". Production of the film wrapped in late August 2022, and was released on Netflix on September 22, 2023.

Though the movie does not include other characters from the franchise, Rodriguez confirmed that it takes place in the same continuity as the previous installments.

=== Future ===
In September 2023, Rodriguez confirmed that global streamer Netflix intends to develop additional Spy Kids movies, with the filmmaker expressing hope to begin production on a sequel the following year. Rodriguez stated that Armageddon incorporated a new family because so much time had passed since All the Time in the World, and so he wanted to incorporate a new set of characters before returning to what came before; confirming that he intends to bring back "legacy characters" from the previous installments in future movies.

== Television ==
Series	Season	Episodes	Originally released	Showrunner(s)	Network(s)
Spy Kids: Mission Critical	1	10	April 20, 2018	F.M. De Marco	Netflix
Spy Kids: Mission Critical	2	10	November 30, 2018	F.M. De Marco	Netflix

=== Spy Kids: Mission Critical (2018) ===
An animated TV series based on the films, Spy Kids: Mission Critical, was released on Netflix in 2018. The first and second seasons both consist of 10 episodes and is produced by Canada-based Mainframe Studios. Robert Rodriguez was one of the executive producers on the show.

== Main cast and characters ==
List indicators

This section includes characters who will appear or have appeared in franchise.

- An empty grey cell indicates the character was not in the film, or that the character's official presence has not yet been confirmed.
- ^{A} indicates an appearance through archival footage or audio.
- ^{V} indicates a voice-only role.
- ^{Y} indicates a younger version of the character.

Characters	Films					Television
Characters	Spy Kids	Spy Kids 2: The Island of Lost Dreams	Spy Kids 3-D: Game Over	Spy Kids: All the Time in the World	Spy Kids: Armageddon	Spy Kids: Mission Critical^{V}
Characters	2001	2002	2003	2011	2023	2018
Carmen Cortez	Alexa Vega Addisyn Fair^{Y}	Alexa Vega	Alexa Vega	Alexa Vega		Ashley Bornancin
Juni Cortez	Daryl Sabara	Daryl Sabara	Daryl Sabara	Daryl Sabara		Carter Hastings
Isador "Machete" Cortez	Danny Trejo	Danny Trejo	Danny Trejo	Danny Trejo		Silent
Fegan Floop	Alan Cumming	Alan Cumming	Alan Cumming			Christian Lanz
Felix Gumm	Cheech Marin	Cheech Marin	Cheech Marin			
Donnagon Giggles	Mike Judge	Mike Judge	Mike Judge			
Alexander Minion	Tony Shalhoub	Tony Shalhoub	Tony Shalhoub			
Gregorio Cortez	Antonio Banderas	Antonio Banderas	Antonio Banderas	Mentioned		Christian Lanz
Ingrid Cortez (née Avellán)	Carla Gugino	Carla Gugino	Carla Gugino	Mentioned		Mira Sorvino
Ms. Gradenko	Teri Hatcher					
Mr. Lisp	Robert Patrick					
Devlin	George Clooney		George Clooney		D. J. Cotrona	
Gary Giggles		Matt O'Leary	Matt O'Leary			
Gerti Giggles		Emily Osment	Emily Osment			
Romero		Steve Buscemi	Steve Buscemi			
Valentin Avellán		Ricardo Montalbán	Ricardo Montalbán			
Helga Avellán		Holland Taylor	Holland Taylor	Holland Taylor^{A}		
Dinky Winks		Bill Paxton	Bill Paxton			
Alexandra		Taylor Momsen				
President of the United States		Christopher McDonald				
Sebastian The Toymaker			Sylvester Stallone			
Arnold			Ryan Pinkston			
Francis			Bobby Edner			
Rez			Robert Vito			
Demetra The Deceiver			Courtney Jines			
Francesca "Cesca" Giggles			Salma Hayek			
The Guy			Elijah Wood			
Rebecca Wilson				Rowan Blanchard		
Cecil Wilson				Mason Cook		
Maria Wilson				Belle Solorzano Genny Solorzano		
Marissa Wilson (née Cortez)				Jessica Alba		
Wilbur Wilson				Joel McHale		
Agent Argonaut				Elmo Ricky Gervais^{V}		
Dane "Danger" D'Amo The Timekeeper				Jeremy Piven Jett Good^{Y}		
Tick-Tock				Jeremy Piven		
Editor / Cameraman				Wray Krawford		
Patricia "Patty" Tango-Torrez					Everly Carganilla	
Antonio "Tony" Tango-Torrez					Connor Esterson	
Nora Torrez					Gina Rodriguez	
Terrence Tango					Zachary Levi	
Rey “The King” Kingston					Billy Magnussen	
Heck Knight					Joe Schilling^{V}	
Glitch						Caitlyn Bairstow
Gablet						Caitlyn Bairstow
Ace						Nicholas Coombe
Claudia Floop Scorpion						Nesta Cooper
Sir Awesome						Richard Ian Cox
Peter St. Ignatius PSI						Travis Turner
Golden Brain						Tom Kenny
Spurious Visage						Tom Kenny
Professor Küpkakke						Tom Kenny
Kopi Vasquez						Candi Milo
Vida Immortata						Candi Milo
Desmond "Dez" Vasquez						Yuri Lowenthal
Zedmond "Zed" Vasquez						Yuri Lowenthal
Jaime Vasquez						Yuri Lowenthal
Jason "Improv" Pietranthony Improvisario						Yuri Lowenthal
Bradley Feinstein Mint Condition						Patton Oswalt
Dr. Chad Jericho						Thomas Lennon
JT the Worm						Bobcat Goldthwait
Agent No-One						Terrence Stone Robert Englund

== Additional crew and production details ==
Film	Crew/Detail					
Film	Composer(s)	Cinematographer(s)	Editor	Production companies	Distributing company	Running time
Spy Kids	Danny Elfman, Gavin Greenaway, Heitor Pereira, John Debney, Robert Rodriguez, Los Lobos, and Harry Gregson-Williams	Guillermo Navarro	Robert Rodriguez	Troublemaker Studios; Dimension Films	Miramax Films	1 hour 28 minutes (Note: The Special Edition/Blu-ray version is 1 hour 31 minutes)
Spy Kids 2: The Island of .Lost Dreams	John Debney & Robert Rodriguez	Robert Rodriguez	Robert Rodriguez	Troublemaker Studios; Dimension Films	Miramax Films	1 hour 40 minutes
Spy Kids 3-D: Game Over	Robert Rodriguez	Robert Rodriguez	Robert Rodriguez	Troublemaker Studios; Dimension Films	Miramax Films	1 hour 24 minutes
Spy Kids: All the Time in the World	Robert Rodriguez & Carl Thiel	Robert Rodriguez & Jimmy Lindsey	Robert Rodriguez & Rebecca Rodriguez	Troublemaker Studios; Dimension Films	The Weinstein Company	1 hour 29 minutes
Spy Kids: Armageddon	Rebel Rodriguez, John Debney & Robert Rodriguez	Robert Rodriguez	Robert Rodriguez	Troublemaker Studios; Skydance Media; Spyglass Media Group	Netflix	1 hour 37 minutes

== Reception ==
=== Box office performance ===
Film	Release date	Box office gross			Budget	Ref(s)
Film	Release date	North America	Other territories	Worldwide	Budget	Ref(s)
Spy Kids	March 30, 2001	$112,719,001	$35,215,179	$147,934,180	$35,000,000	
Spy Kids 2: The Island of Lost Dreams	August 7, 2002	$85,846,429	$33,876,929	$119,723,358	$38,000,000	
Spy Kids 3-D: Game Over	July 25, 2003	$111,761,982	$85,339,696	$197,101,678	$32,500,000	
Spy Kids: All the Time in the World	August 18, 2011	$38,538,188	$47,026,122	$85,564,310	$27,000,000	
Total		$348,865,600	$201,457,926	$550,323,526	$132,500,000	

=== Critical and public response ===
The first and second film received positive reviews, the third and fifth film received mixed reviews, and the fourth film received negative reviews.

Film	Rotten Tomatoes	Metacritic	CinemaScore
Spy Kids	93% (128 reviews)	71 (27 reviews)	A
Spy Kids 2: The Island of Lost Dreams	75% (135 reviews)	66 (29 reviews)	A–
Spy Kids 3-D: Game Over	45% (141 reviews)	57 (30 reviews)	B+
Spy Kids: All the Time in the World	23% (61 reviews)	37 (14 reviews)	B+
Spy Kids: Armageddon	55% (33 reviews)	55 (10 reviews)	

== Home media ==
- September 18, 2001 (Spy Kids) on VHS and DVD by Buena Vista Home Entertainment
- February 18, 2003 (Spy Kids 2: The Island of Lost Dreams) on VHS and DVD by Buena Vista Home Entertainment
- February 24, 2004 (Spy Kids 3D: Game Over) on VHS and DVD by Buena Vista Home Entertainment
- August 2, 2011 (Spy Kids, Spy Kids 2: The Island of Lost Dreams, and Spy Kids 3-D: Game Over) on DVD and Blu-ray Disc by Lionsgate (However, all 3 DVDs are still the original Buena Vista Home Entertainment copies.)
- November 15, 2011 (Spy Kids, Spy Kids 2: The Island of Lost Dreams, and Spy Kids 3-D: Game Over Triple Feature) on Blu-ray Disc by Lionsgate
- November 22, 2011 (Spy Kids: All the Time in the World) on DVD and Blu-ray by Anchor Bay Entertainment
- December 4, 2012 (Spy Kids 3-D: Game Over, The Adventures of Sharkboy and Lavagirl in 3-D 3D Double Feature) on Blu-ray 3D Disc by Lionsgate
- September 22, 2020 (Spy Kids, Spy Kids 2: The Island of Lost Dreams, and Spy Kids 3-D: Game Over Triple Feature) on DVD and Blu-ray Disc reissue by Paramount

== Books ==
=== Novelizations ===
Novelizations of the films Spy Kids, Spy Kids 2: The Island of Lost Dreams, and Spy Kids 3-D: Game Over were released by Disney-Hyperion. They were adapted by Megan Stine, Kiki Thorpe, and Kitty Richards.

The posters and end of the credits for each film say "Read the Talk/Miramax Books", telling the viewers to read the print retelling.

=== KD Novelties personalized book ===
In 2002, KD Novelties made a personalized children's book based on Spy Kids 2: The Island of Lost Dreams.

=== Spy Kids Adventures ===
Between 2003 and 2004, Disney-Hyperion released ten novels of a book series titled Spy Kids Adventures, written by Elizabeth Lenhard.

1. One Agent Too Many
2. A New Kind of Super Spy
3. Mucho Madness
4. OSS Wilderness
5. Mall of the Universe
6. Spy TV
7. Superstar Spies
8. Freeze-Frame
9. Spring Fever
10. Off Sides

== Comics ==
=== Syndicated Disney magazine comics (2001–2004) ===
From 2001 to 2004, children's anthology magazines Disney Adventures and BBC Magazines' Disney's Big Time and Disney's Comic published over a dozen syndicated short comics that accompanied the first three films as well as additional stories for Disney's Comic and Disney's Big Time. They were written by Steve Behling and/or Michael Stewart, penciled and inked by Christine Norrie, colored by John Green (with the exception of the April 2002 issue's comic The Big Drop, which was colored by Atomic Paintbrush, and the Disney Adventures Comic Zone first issue's comic Tomorrow Trouble, which was colored by Hi-Fi Color Design), and lettered by Michael Stewart.

==== Spy Kids ====
- Pop! Goes the World! (September 2001, Disney Adventures; November 2001, Disney Adventures Australia)
- Deep Trouble! (October 2001, Disney Adventures; December 2001, Disney Adventures Australia; July 2002, Disney's Comic)
- Caught by the Web! (November 2001, Disney Adventures; January 2002, Disney Adventures Australia; September 2002, Disney's Comic)
- F.A.N.G.s a Lot! (March 2002, Disney Adventures; June 2002, Disney Adventures Australia; August 2002, Disney's Comic)
- The Big Drop! (April 2002, Disney Adventures; July 2002, Disney Adventures Australia)
- The Invisible Enemy! (May 2002, Disney Adventures; August 2002, Disney Adventures Australia)
- Fright Flight! (June 2002, Disney Adventures; September 2002, Disney Adventures Australia)
- The Menace of Micro-Man! (Summer 2002, Disney Adventures; January 2003, Disney Adventures Australia)
- The Mysterious Many-Man! (Q3 2002, Disney Adventures Super Comic Special; September 2003, Disney Adventures Australia)
- Tomorrow Trouble! (Summer 2004, Disney Adventures Comic Zone)

==== Spy Kids 2 ====
- Rodeo Ruckus! (September 2002, Disney Adventures; March 2003, Disney Adventures Australia, Disney's Comic)
- Face to Face with F.A.N.G.! (April 2003, Disney Adventures, Disney's Comic; December 2003, Disney Adventures Comic Book - All The Coolest Comics Australia)
- Nightmare at 30,000 Feet! (May 2003, Disney's Comic)
- Cereal-ised! (June 2003, Disney's Comic)

==== Spy Kids 3 ====
- Top Gear! (July 2003, Disney's Comic; February 2004, Disney Adventures Australia)
- A Model Spy! (July 2003, Disney's Big Time)
- That's Snow Spy! (August 2003, Disney's Comic; Winter 2004, Disney Adventures Comic Zone)
- Metal Menace! (August 2003, Disney's Big Time; April 2004, Disney Adventures)

=== McDonald's comics (2003) ===
In July 2003, McDonald's published a six-issue limited series based on Spy Kids 3-D: Game Over. It was distributed in McDonald's Happy Meals to promote the film, bundled with Happy Meal toys as well as anaglyph 3D glasses made for the comics.

1. The Chip that Shook Up the World!
2. The Diabolical Doctor Kent!
3. The Outbreak of Silence!
4. The Taking of the Presidency
5. The Demise of Doctor Kent
6. The Computer Planet

== Video games ==
- Spy Kids Challenger (2002, Game Boy Advance)
- Spy Kids: Mega Mission Zone (2002, Microsoft Windows and Mac)
- Spy Kids 3-D: Game Over (2003, Microsoft Windows and Mac)
- Spy Kids 3-D: Game Over (2003, Game Boy Advance)
- Spy Kids: Learning Adventures series
  - The Underground Affair (2004, Microsoft Windows and Mac)
  - The Man in the Moon (2004, Microsoft Windows and Mac)
  - The Candy Conspiracy (2004, Microsoft Windows and Mac)
  - The Nightmare Machine (2004, Microsoft Windows and Mac)
- Spy Kids: All the Time in the World (2011, Nintendo DS)

== Related film series ==
Isador "Machete" Cortez, who appeared in all four Spy Kids film series as a supporting character, additionally had a series of two stand-alone films: Machete and Machete Kills, also written and directed by Robert Rodriguez. However, the Machete films share little in common with the Spy Kids films thematically and are not considered direct spin-offs, the first film instead being an adult-oriented action exploitation film, with the second film introducing sci-fi elements; both films additionally share several cast members and characters with the Spy Kids films. The idea for a Machete film came from a fake trailer promoting the Grindhouse double-feature by Rodriguez and Quentin Tarantino. Trejo and Rodriguez have made two conflicting statements regarding its canonicity to the Spy Kids films; Trejo claimed that the films depict "what Uncle Machete does when he's not taking care of the kids", while Rodriguez said in a Reddit AMA that they are alternate universes. Regardless, Rodriguez claimed that he was prompted by an incident on the set of the first Machete film to start envisioning a fourth film in the main Spy Kids film series, casting Jessica Alba as Machete's sister Marissa, a different character to the one she portrayed in Machete, with Trejo additionally reprising his role alongside her.
