= The Black Mamba (film) =

2011 short film by Robert Rodriguez

- Official release poster
- Directed by: Robert Rodriguez
- Screenplay by: Robert Rodriguez
- Produced by: Robert Rodriguez
- Starring: Kobe Bryant; Kanye West; Danny Trejo; Bruce Willis
- Cinematography: Robert Rodriguez
- Edited by: Robert Rodriguez
- Music by: Robert Rodriguez
- Production companies: RadicalMedia; Troublemaker Studios
- Distributed by: Nike
- Release date: February 19, 2011
- Running time: 6 minutes
- Country: United States
- Language: English

The Black Mamba is an American short film produced, written, and directed by Robert Rodriguez. It stars Kobe Bryant, Kanye West, Danny Trejo, and Bruce Willis.

The Black Mamba was released by Nike online on February 19, 2011.

== Plot ==
The Black Mamba is about the making of a fictional movie, with Robert Rodriguez pitching Kobe Bryant a story about a hero called "The Black Mamba". It is shown, as Rodriguez describes it, with Bryant squaring off against a monster-fied Danny Trejo, before meeting Bruce Willis. The film ends with Bryant fighting zombie basketball players led by Kanye West.

== Cast ==
- Kobe Bryant as himself / "The Black Mamba"
- Kanye West as himself
- Danny Trejo as himself
- Bruce Willis as Mr. Suave

== Production ==
By 2011, Kobe Bryant, Bruce Willis, Danny Trejo, and Kanye West signed on to star in a 6-minute short film under the title The Black Mamba. The film was produced, written, and directed by Robert Rodriguez. The film was part of a promotional campaign for the Nike Air Kobe Zoom VIs.

== Release ==
The Black Mamba was released by Nike online on February 19, 2011. The short film also played in several Los Angeles cinemas, including Mann's Chinese Theatre.

=== Critical reception ===
Kevin Jagernauth, of IndieWire, said the short film was "OK", elaborating "it fits very comfortably into the grindhouse wheelhouse for Rodriguez, so if you've worn out your Machete DVD this is probably worth a quick spin".

Chris Yuscavage, of Vibe, gave a mixed review, praising Rodriguez's metahumor, but criticizing Bruce Willis' minor role and Bryant's "manufactured" stage name of "The Black Mamba".

Germain Lussier, of /Film, gave the short film a negative review, saying it was "not as fun as I thought it was going to be. I think having Rodriguez as one of the main parts of the film and making the whole thing a pitch/fantasy is the only thing that makes it work. The cameo appearances are funny and the idea of a super-villain collecting shoes is kind of interesting, but overall the action was stale and the basketball itself was boring. Seeing a new film by Rodriguez is cool, and his visual style within the film is hugely apparent, but, for my money, The Black Mamba can't hold a candle to the real highlight of the NBA All-Star Weekend: the Slam Dunk Contest".

William Goodman, of CBS News, was more positive of the film, calling it "pretty slick".
