= Daryl Sabara =

American actor (born 1992)

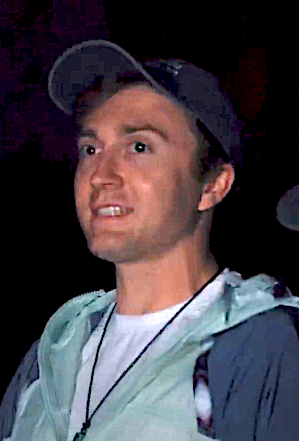
- Sabara in 2022
- Born: Daryl Christopher Sabara; June 14, 1992 (age 34); Torrance, California, U.S.
- Occupation: Actor
- Years active: 1992–present
- Spouse: Meghan Trainor (m. 2018)
- Children: 3

Daryl Christopher Sabara (born June 14, 1992) is an American actor. He is known for portraying Juni Cortez in the Spy Kids film series, and for a variety of television and film appearances, first as a child actor and continuing into adult roles, including voice roles.

== Early life ==
Sabara was born on June 14, 1992 to a Jewish family of Russian descent in Torrance, California, a suburb of Los Angeles. His father, who died in 2026, left the family when he was a year old and he was raised by a single mother. His family would attend Chabad events and had his bar mitzvah at a Chabad house. He graduated from West Torrance High School in 2010. His twin sister, Eve Sabara, is also an actor. Sabara began performing with the regional ballet company, South Bay Ballet.

== Career ==
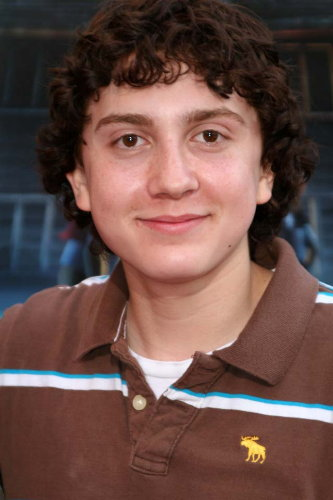
Sabara in 2006

Sabara began acting during the mid-1990s, appearing on episodes of Murphy Brown, Life's Work, Friends, and Will and Grace, before being cast as Juni Cortez in the Spy Kids series of family films, which became popular among pre-teen audiences.

Sabara has appeared in episodes of the television series such as Weeds, House, Dr. Vegas, and was one of the judges on America's Most Talented Kid. Sabara voiced the main character, Hero Boy, in the 2004 animated version of The Polar Express. He then played a young Jewish boy trying to have a nice bar mitzvah in Keeping Up with the Steins, which received a limited release on May 12, 2006. He also guest starred in the Criminal Minds episode, "P911" where he played a sexually molested child. He also provided the voices for the titular character in Generator Rex and Hunter in Father of the Pride.

Sabara next appeared in the films Her Best Move and the interactive DVD Choose Your Own Adventure: The Abominable Snowman, played Ben on The Last Chance Detectives radio dramas by Adventures in Odyssey and Focus on the Family, and also appeared as school bully Wesley Rhoades in Rob Zombie's Halloween. He then played Irwin in the theater play The Catskills Sonata, about a young Jewish busboy in the late 1950s.

In 2003, Sabara made a guest appearance as the character Owen on an episode of Friends, during which Matthew Perry's character Chandler accidentally reveals to Owen that he is adopted. He also gained a recurring role in the Disney Channel sitcom Wizards of Waverly Place as T.J. Taylor, a wizard who ignores the rules and uses magic the way he wants, often getting him into trouble. He was also in The Boondocks as the voice of Butch Magnus Milosevic in the second season episode "Shinin'". He appeared in two episodes of The Batman: first as Harris, a middle schooler; then as Scorn, the sidekick of the villain Wrath. Both roles were opposite his twin sister Eve, who voiced Robin.

Sabara co-starred in the 2009 film April Showers, a film written and directed by a survivor of the 1999 Columbine High School massacre. He played Kyle, a misanthropic teenager in World's Greatest Dad, with Robin Williams, and Peter Cratchit in the 2009 film adaptation of A Christmas Carol. He also appeared in the comedy series Easy To Assemble, where he played a character named George. In 2010, Sabara appeared in the film Machete, and the MTV film Worst. Prom. Ever. which premiered May 10. In 2012, he co-starred in John Carter as Edgar Rice Burroughs. He also portrayed the recurring role of Tim Scottson in seven episodes (spanning from 2005 to 2012) of Weeds. In 2014, he starred alongside Chloë Grace Moretz in the off-Broadway play The Library, directed by Steven Soderbergh.

== Personal life ==
Sabara started dating singer-songwriter Meghan Trainor in July 2016. They became engaged on December 22, 2017, and married on December 22, 2018, Trainor's 25th birthday. On October 7, 2020, Trainor and Sabara announced they were expecting their first child, a boy. On February 8, 2021, Trainor gave birth to their first son. In January 2023, Trainor and Sabara announced they were expecting their second child. On April 25, 2023, Trainor and Sabara announced on The Kelly Clarkson Show that their second child is a boy. On July 1, 2023, they welcomed their second son. They also welcomed a baby girl in January 2026, via surrogate.

== Filmography ==
=== Film ===
Year	Title	Role	Notes
2001	Spy Kids	Juni Cortez	
2002	Spy Kids 2: The Island of Lost Dreams	Juni Cortez	
2003	Spy Kids 3-D: Game Over	Juni Cortez	
2004	The Polar Express	Hero Boy	Voice
2005	My Neighbors the Yamadas	Noburu	Voice; English dub
2006	Keeping Up with the Steins	Benjamin Fielder	
2006	Choose Your Own Adventure: The Abominable Snowman	Marco North	Voice; direct-to-video
2006	Solace	Gunther	Short film
2006	Maybe It's in the Water	Himself	Short film
2007	Her Best Move	Doggie	
2007	Normal Adolescent Behavior	Nathan	
2007	Halloween	Wesley Rhoades	
2009	World's Greatest Dad	Kyle Clayton	
2009	April Showers	Jason	
2009	A Christmas Carol	Undertaker's Apprentice, Tattered Caroler, Beggar Boy, Well-Dressed Caroler	Voice and motion-capture
2010	Machete	Junito	
2011	Blacktino	Evan	
2011	Spy Kids: All the Time in the World	Juni Cortez	
2012	John Carter	Ned	
2013	After the Dark	Chips	
2013	The Green Inferno	Lars	
2014	Teen Lust	Matt	

=== Television ===
Year	Title	Role	Notes
1992	Murphy Brown	Baby Brown	3 episodes
1996	Life's Work	Toby	Episode: "Pilot"
1999	Love & Money	Roger	Episode: "Career Daze"
1999	Roswell	Corey	Episode: "Monsters"
2000	Will & Grace	Broccoli Boy	Episode: "Sweet (and Sour) Charity"
2002	Total Access 24/7	Himself / Juni Cortez	1 episode
2002	All That	Spy Kids	Episode: "Knubby McFarlin"
2002	John Doe	Wesley Silver	Episode: "Mind Games"
2002	One on One	Jeffy	Episode: "Is It Safe?"
2002	What's New, Scooby-Doo?	Tommy, Steve	Voice; episode: "A Scooby-Doo! Christmas"
2003	The O'Keefes	Daryl	Recurring role
2003	Gamefarm	Himself	Guest; 1 episode
2003	Trading Spaces: Boys vs. Girls	Himself	Episode: Siblings "Eli vs. Kali"
2003	Friends	Owen	Episode: “The One Where Ross is Fine”
2004	Century City	Frank "Auggie" Wood	Episode: "To Know Her"
2004	Fatherhood	Larry Keating	Voice
2004	Dr. Vegas	Jesse Selznick	Episode: "Love for Life"
2004	Murder Without Conviction	James Talley (age 10)	Television film
2004–2005	Father of the Pride	Hunter	Voice; main role
2005	House	Gabriel Reilich	Episode: "Cursed"
2005	Grounded For Life	Garth	1 episode
2005–2012	Weeds	Tim Scottson	Recurring role
2006	American Dragon: Jake Long	Hobie	Voice; episode: "Ring Around the Dragon"
2006	Criminal Minds	Kevin Rose	Episode: "P911"
2006	What About Brian	Lil' Adam	Episode: "What About Denial..."
2006	Lolo's Cafe	Mikey	Voice; television film
2006	Boys Life	Scott Morrow	Episode: "Pilot"
2007	The Boondocks	Butch Magnus Milosevic	Voice; episode: "Shinin'"
2007–2008	The Batman	Andrew Mallory / Scorn, Harris	Voice; 2 episodes
2007–2009	Wizards of Waverly Place	T.J. Taylor	Recurring role
2008	Miss Guided	Russell	Episode: "Homecoming"
2008	The Closer	Jason Hetner	Episode: "Problem Child"
2009	Easy to Assemble	George	Recurring role
2010	Scooby-Doo! Mystery Incorporated	Jason / British Nerd	Voice; episode: "Howl of the Fright Hound"
2010–2013	Generator Rex	Rex Salazar, Cade Rombauer, White Fighter, East Side Kid	Voice; main role
2011	Worst. Prom. Ever.	Clark Peterson	Television film
2011	Ben 10/Generator Rex: Heroes United	Rex Salazar	Voice; television film
2012	Grimm	Hanson	Episode: "Organ Grinder"
2012	Gravity Falls	Son on Pier	Voice; episode: "Fight Fighters"
2013	Avengers Assemble	Aaron Reece	Voice; episode: "Molecule Kid"
2013–2015	Ultimate Spider-Man	Alex O'Hirn / Rhino	Voice; recurring role
2015	Resident Advisors	Leslie	Recurring role
2015	Zombie Basement	Joel	Recurring role
2016–2021	Ben 10	Heatblast, Rex Salazar, additional voices	Voice; recurring role
2020	Ben 10 Versus the Universe: The Movie	Heatblast, Vulpimancer Prisoner	Voice; television film
2023	Australian Idol	Himself	Guest

=== Video games ===
Year	Title	Role
2004	The Polar Express	Hero Boy
2011	FusionFall	Rex Salazar
2011	Generator Rex: Agent of Providence	Rex Salazar
2011	Saints Row: The Third	Pedestrian and character voices
2017	Ben 10	Heatblast
