= Wicked Blood =

- Promotional poster
- Directed by: Mark Young
- Written by: Mark Young
- Produced by: Eric Bassett; Jason Pinardo; Nick Stagliano; Andre Relis
- Starring: Abigail Breslin; Alexa Vega; Sean Bean; Lew Temple; Jake Busey; James Purefoy
- Cinematography: Gregg Easterbook
- Edited by: Ryan Folsey
- Music by: Elia Cmiral
- Production companies: Industrial Entertainment; Nazz Productions; Primary Pictures; Thunder Smoke Media
- Distributed by: Entertainment One
- Release dates: February 5, 2014 (Santa Barbara); March 4, 2014 (United States)
- Running time: 92 minutes
- Country: United States
- Language: English
- Budget: $2 million

Wicked Blood is a 2014 action thriller film written and directed by Mark Young and starring Abigail Breslin, Alexa Vega, and Sean Bean. It was released on March 4, 2014, in the United States.

== Premise ==
Hannah Lee Baker (Abigail Breslin) and Amber Baker (Alexa Vega) live with their uncle Donny Baker (Lew Temple). Donny is a meth cook for his brother in law and the girl's uncle Frank Stinson (Sean Bean). Hannah puts into play a conspiracy to free herself, Amber and Donny from Frank's grasp.

== Cast ==
- Abigail Breslin as Hannah Lee Baker
- Alexa Vega as Amber Dawn Baker
- Sean Bean as Frank Stinson
- Lew Temple as Donny Baker
- James Purefoy as Bill Owens
- Jake Busey as Bobby Stinson
- J. D. Evermore as Doctor
- Ritchie Montgomery as Hank
- Thomas Francis Murphy as Bearded Man
