= Alexa PenaVega =

American actress (born 1988)

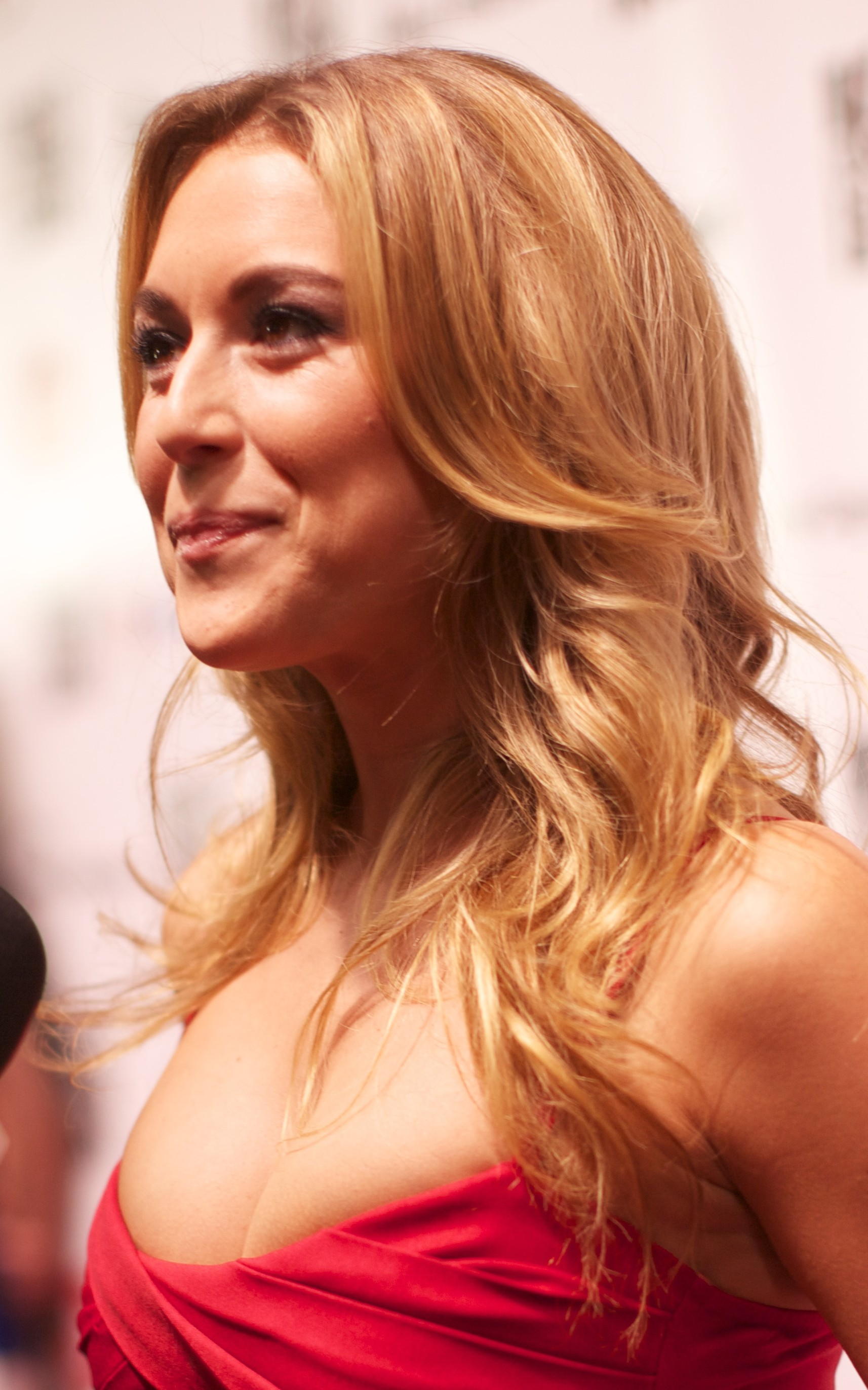
- Vega in 2013
- Born: Alexa Ellesse Vega; August 27, 1988 (age 38); Miami, Florida, U.S.
- Occupation: Actress • singer
- Years active: 1993–present
- Spouses: Sean Covel (m. 2010; div. 2012); Carlos Pena Jr. (m. 2014)
- Children: 4 (Note: Including 1 stillborn.)
- Relatives: Makenzie Vega (sister)

Alexa Ellesse PenaVega (née Vega; Spanish: Peña; born August 27, 1988) is an American actress. She is known for her roles as Carmen Cortez in the first four Spy Kids films and Julie Corky in the 2004 film Sleepover. In 2009, she starred as the title character Ruby Gallagher in the ABC Family series Ruby & the Rockits.

== Early life ==
Vega's father, Baruch Vega, is a Colombian fashion photographer and former informer for the Central Intelligence Agency, and her mother, Gina Rue, is a former model.

Vega has six siblings, including actress Makenzie Vega. She moved with her family to California when she was four years old. As a teenager, she was homeschooled.

== Career ==
In 1996, at the age of eight, Vega starred as young Jo Harding in Twister. She guest-starred in numerous television shows and films, including ER, Follow the Stars Home, Ghost Whisperer, and The Bernie Mac Show. She became known worldwide in 2001 for her role as "Carmen Cortez" in Spy Kids. The first Spy Kids film was a huge success, and two sequels, Spy Kids 2: The Island of Lost Dreams and Spy Kids 3-D: Game Over, were filmed. During the shooting of the three films she performed most of her own stunts. In 2011, Vega appeared in the sequel, Spy Kids: All the Time in the World, as a grown Carmen Cortez.

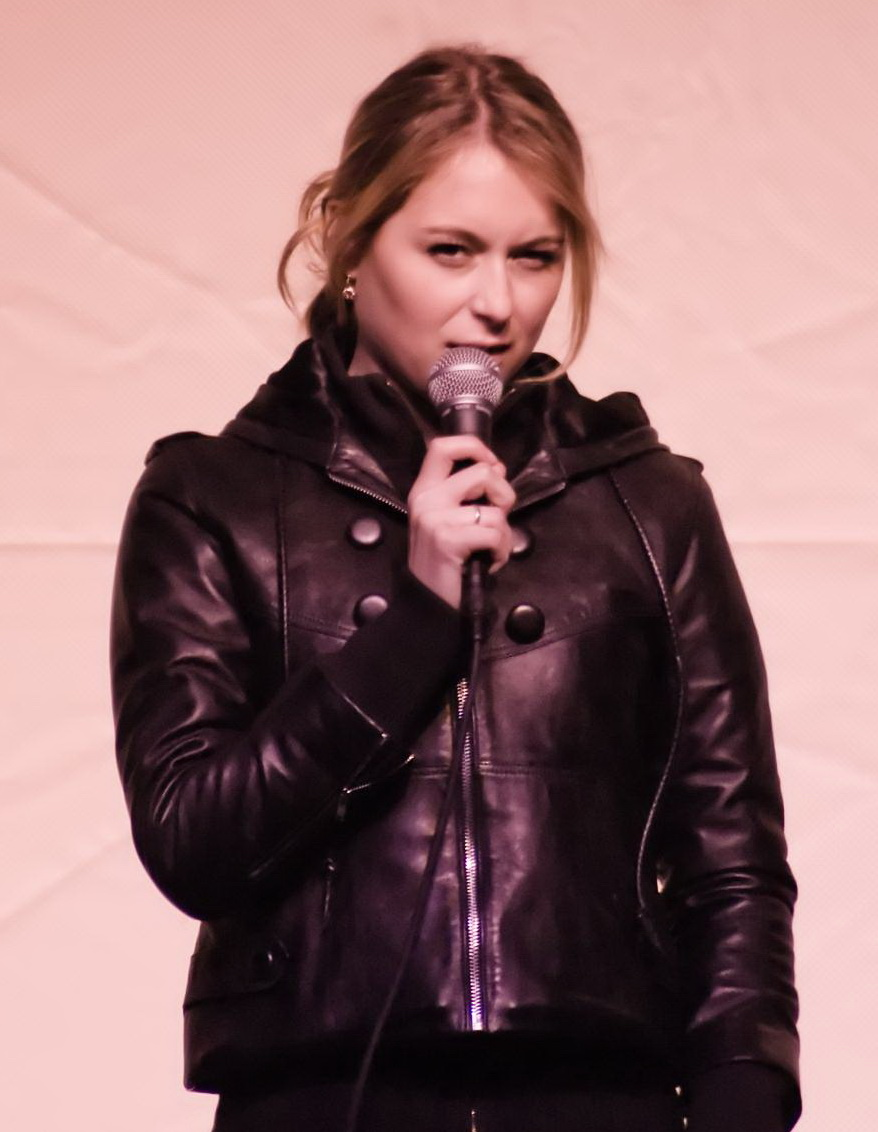
Vega speaking during a Repo! Road Tour, 2009

She was named one of the year's hottest teen celebrities in the July 2003 issue Vanity Fair. In 2004, Vega finished filming two films: Sleepover and State's Evidence. The following year, she starred in the Lifetime television film Odd Girl Out, as a victim of cyber-bullying. In 2006, she starred in another made-for-TV movie, Walkout; and finished filming Remember the Daze, which was released in limited theaters in April 2007. She completed filming Repo! The Genetic Opera, which was released in 2008. Vega was confirmed as the lead role in Helix, written and directed by Aram Rappaport, which began filming in Chicago in March 2008. She was originally cast in the 2009 Robert Rodriguez film Shorts, however, due to her being in Australia for the filming of Broken Hill, she had to be recast. She was replaced by Kat Dennings. She appeared on Broadway in Hairspray, as Penny. In 2009, she played Ruby Gallagher on the ABC Family television sitcom Ruby & the Rockits, which also starred Patrick and David Cassidy.

Vega played Wick in the 2012 film The Devil's Carnival, a film from director Darren Lynn Bousman and screenwriter Terrance Zdunich, who previously worked with Vega in Repo! The Genetic Opera. Vega also sang two songs on the soundtrack for the film. Throughout 2012, Vega starred in the independent thriller, 2br/1ba, directed by Rob Margolies and co-stars with Spencer Grammer and Kathryn Morris. Vega also starred in the Lifetime Channel movie The Pregnancy Project and her animated film The Clockwork Girl was completed. Vega's film, The Mine, which was filmed in 2010 got a limited release/screening. Vega also voiced Christina in the animated series Unsupervised and had a guest role on Royal Pains. Vega played the young heroine in Aerosmith's music video "Legendary Child".

Throughout 2013 and 2014, Vega appeared in the films 23 Blast, Machete Kills, Bounty Killer, Wicked Blood, The Remaining, and The Hunters. She guest starred on the Big Time Rush series finale "Big Time Dreams", playing herself. In 2015, Vega appeared in Do You Believe? as Lacey.

In the fall of 2015, Vega competed on the 21st season of Dancing with the Stars; Vega was paired with professional dancer Mark Ballas. On November 9, Vega and Ballas were eliminated in Week 9 and finished the competition in 6th place. Her husband, Carlos PenaVega, also competed in that season; he and his partner were eliminated in Week 11.

In 2016, she began starring in a series of Hallmark made for television films, such as Ms. Matched, Destination Wedding, and Christmas Made to Order.

In 2019, Vega and her husband Carlos PenaVega starred in the Hallmark Movies & Mysteries TV movie Picture Perfect Mysteries: Newlywed and Dead, and in 2020 the follow-up Picture Perfect Mysteries: Dead over Diamonds. She also starred in The Power Couple, a Pure Flix original series.

== Personal life ==
Vega married American film producer Sean Covel on October 10, 2010 in a ceremony held in his hometown of Lead, South Dakota. Robert Rodriguez walked her down the aisle. In July 2012, Vega announced on Twitter that she had divorced Covel.

In late 2012, Vega started dating American actor and singer Carlos Pena Jr., star of Nickelodeon series Big Time Rush and member of pop music boy band by the same name, after meeting him at a Bible study. She made a guest appearance on the final episode of Big Time Rush, aired in July 2013, playing the on-screen new girlfriend of Pena's character, Carlos Garcia. The couple got engaged in August 2013, and were married on January 4, 2014 in Puerto Vallarta, Mexico, both taking PenaVega as their married name. The couple shares a YouTube channel, La Vida PenaVega (formerly LexLovesLos). The couple have had four children – two sons born in December 2016 and June 2019, a daughter born in May 2021, and another daughter who was stillborn in April 2024. As of 2025, the family lives in Nashville, Tennessee. They previously lived in Maui.

Vega is a Christian and has said that her faith is the most important thing in her life. She has also spoken out against abortion, describing herself as "hardcore pro-life."

== Filmography ==
=== Film ===
Year	Title	Role	Notes
1994	Little Giants	Priscilla O'Shea	
1995	Nine Months	Molly Dwyer	
1996	Twister	Young Jo Thornton	
1996	The Glimmer Man	Cole's Daughter	
1996	Ghosts of Mississippi	Claire DeLaughter	
1998	Dennis the Menace Strikes Again	Gina	Direct-to-video film
1999	The Deep End of the Ocean	Young Kerry Cappadora	
2000	Run the Wild Fields	Opal "Pug" Miller	
2001	Spy Kids	Carmen Cortez	
2001	Follow The Stars Home	Amy Williams	
2002	Spy Kids 2: The Island of Lost Dreams	Carmen Cortez	
2003	Spy Kids 3-D: Game Over	Carmen Cortez	
2004	Sleepover	Julie Corky	
2006	State's Evidence	Sandy	Direct-to-video film
2006	Marrying God	Ivy	Short film
2007	Remember the Daze	Holly	
2008	Repo! The Genetic Opera	Shilo Wallace	
2009	The Blue Elephant 2	Melody (voice)	
2009	Broken Hill	Kat Rogers	
2009	Innocent	Ashley	
2010	Mother's Day	Jenna Luther	
2010	Café	Sally	
2011	From Prada to Nada	Mary Dominguez	
2011	Spy Kids: All the Time in the World	Carmen Cortez	
2011	Summer Song	Ellie	
2012	The Devil's Carnival	Wick	
2012	Abandoned Mine	Sharon	
2013	Bounty Killer	Stewardess	
2013	Machete Kills	KillJoy	
2014	The Clockwork Girl	Tesla (voice)	
2014	Wicked Blood	Amber Dawn Baker	
2014	Code Academy	Libby	Short film
2014	Sin City: A Dame to Kill For	Gilda	
2014	The Remaining	Skylar Chapman	
2014	23 Blast	Ashley	
2015	Spare Parts	Karla	
2015	Do You Believe?	Lacey	
2015	Roommate Wanted	Janie	
2015	Pixies	Michelle Meyers (voice)	
2015	The Murder Pact	Camille	
2018	Sleep Away	Isabella	
2020	Mighty Oak	Valerie Scoggins	
2024	Mr. Manhattan	Dani	
2024	The Casagrandes Movie	Carlota Casagrande (voice)	

=== Television ===
Year	Title	Role	Notes
1993–1994	Evening Shade	Emily Newton	Recurring role (season 4)
1995	ER	Bonnie Howe	Episode: "Sleepless in Chicago"
1995	Chicago Hope	Sara Wilmette	Episode: "Every Day a Little Death"
1995	It Was Him or Us	Young Carrie Wilson	Television film
1996	A Promise to Carolyn	Young Kay	Television film
1996	Life's Work	Tess Hunter	Episode: Pilot
1998	The Magnificent Seven	Olivia Greer	Episode: "Safecracker"
1998	To Have & to Hold	Kelly McGrail	Recurring role
1999	NetForce	Susie Michaels	Television film
1999	Ladies Man	Wendy Stiles	Main role
2002	Total Access 24/7	Herself	Episode: "Spy Kids 2"
2002	All That	Herself	Episode: "Knubby McFarlin"
2002	Wild & Crazy Kids	Herself	Celebrity guest
2003	The Bernie Mac Show	Jill	Episode: "Magic Jordan"
2003	Trading Spaces: Boys vs. Girls	Herself	Episode: Siblings "Eli vs. Kali"
2005	Odd Girl Out	Vanessa Snyder	Television film
2006	Walkout	Paula Crisostomo	Television film
2009	Ghost Whisperer	Serena	2 episodes
2009	Ruby & the Rockits	Ruby Gallagher	Main role
2010	The Middle	Morgan Edwards	2 episodes
2012	Royal Pains	Hollister	Episode: "Imperfect Storm"
2012	The Pregnancy Project	Gaby Rodriguez	Television film
2012	Unsupervised	Christina Rivera (voice)	Recurring role
2013	Big Time Rush	Herself	Episode: "Big Time Dreams"
2014	The Tomorrow People	Hillary Cole	Recurring role
2014	The Hunters	Dylan Savini	Television film
2014	Courtside	Herself	Episode: "Alexa Vega"
2014	Muertoons	Rosita (voice)	2 episodes
2014–2015	Nashville	Kiley Brenner	Recurring role
2015	The Mentalist	Lily Stoppard	Episode: "The Whites of His Eyes"
2015	Dancing with the Stars	Herself	Contestant (season 21)
2016	Ms Matched	Libby Boland	Television film
2017–2023	The Loud House	Carlota Casagrande (voice)	Recurring role (season 2–4, 6–7)
2017	Destination Wedding	Ellie Hamilton	Television film
2017	Enchanted Christmas	Laura Trudeau	Television film
2018	Love at Sea	Olivia Graham	Television film
2018	Christmas Made to Order	Gretchen	Television film
2019	Picture Perfect Mysteries: Newlywed and Dead	Allie Adams	Television film
2019–2022	The Casagrandes	Carlota Casagrande (voice)	Main role
2020	Blue's Clues & You!	Herself	Episode: "Happy Birthday Blue!"
2020	Picture Perfect Mysteries: Dead Over Diamonds	Allie Adams	Television film
2020	Picture Perfect Mysteries: Exit Stage, Death	Allie Adams	Television film
2021	Taking A Shot At Love	Jenna	Television film
2022	Love in the Limelight	Summer Rivera	Television film
2023	A Paris Proposal	Anna Bowman	Television film
2023	Never Too Late to Celebrate	Camila	Television film
2025	A Week Away: The Series	Nurse	Episode: "It Is Well"
2026	Celebrity Weakest Link	Herself	Contestant
