= Spy Kids 3-D: Game Over =

2003 film by Robert Rodriguez

- Theatrical release poster
- Directed by: Robert Rodriguez
- Written by: Robert Rodriguez
- Based on: Spy Kids by Robert Rodriguez
- Produced by: Elizabeth Avellán; Robert Rodriguez
- Starring: Antonio Banderas; Carla Gugino; Alexa Vega; Daryl Sabara; Ricardo Montalbán; Holland Taylor; Mike Judge; Cheech Marin; Sylvester Stallone
- Cinematography: Robert Rodriguez
- Edited by: Robert Rodriguez
- Music by: Robert Rodriguez
- Production company: Troublemaker Studios
- Distributed by: Dimension Films
- Release dates: July 13, 2003 (Paramount Theatre); July 25, 2003 (United States)
- Running time: 84 minutes
- Country: United States
- Language: English
- Budget: $38 million
- Box office: $197 million

Spy Kids 3-D: Game Over (also known simply as Spy Kids 3: Game Over) is a 2003 American 3D spy action comedy film co-produced, written, shot, edited, composed, and directed by Robert Rodriguez. It is the sequel to Spy Kids 2: The Island of Lost Dreams (2002) and the third installment in the Spy Kids film series. The film stars Antonio Banderas, Carla Gugino, Alexa Vega, Daryl Sabara, Ricardo Montalbán, Holland Taylor, Mike Judge, Cheech Marin, and Sylvester Stallone.

Spy Kids 3-D: Game Over premiered at the Paramount Theatre in Austin, Texas on July 13, 2003, and was released in the United States on July 25, by Dimension Films. Despite mixed reviews from critics, the film grossed over $197 million worldwide against a production budget of $38 million, becoming the highest-grossing film in the series.

Though this was initially intended to be the final installment in the Spy Kids film series, it was eventually followed by a fourth film, Spy Kids: All the Time in the World, in 2011, and a fifth, Spy Kids: Armageddon, in 2023.

== Plot ==
Over a year after the events of the second film, Juni Cortez has retired from the OSS and now works as a private detective. One day, he is contacted by President Devlin, the former head of the OSS, who informs him that his sister, Carmen Cortez, is missing, forcing him to return.

At the OSS, Juni is reunited with a now-reformed Donnagon Giggles and his wife Francesca who explain that Carmen is stuck in a game due to the Toymaker, a former OSS informant who was imprisoned in cyberspace. He has since created Game Over, a virtual-reality based video game which he intends to use to take control of children's minds and the world's youth. Juni must venture into the game, save Carmen, who is stuck on Level 4, and shut down the game.

Starting in Level 1, Juni finds the challenges difficult and meets three beta testers, Francis, Arnold, and Rez. Having already lost two of his nine lives, he receives the opportunity to bring in an ally for assistance and chooses his wheelchair-using grandfather Valentin, who shares a personal history with the Toymaker. Valentin receives a robotic bodysuit, allowing him to walk and possess superhuman strength. Searching for the entrance to Level 2, Juni ventures into a robot battle arena where he fights a girl named Demetra. He receives a robotic suit and loses another life, but is able to defeat her.

The beta testers believe that Juni is a player named "The Guy" (due to his resemblance to "The Guy" from a promotional poster) who can supposedly beat the "un-winnable" Level 5. Rez challenges Juni to a race that will allow them to proceed to Level 3. Juni wins the race, and Demetra joins them; she and Juni display romantic feelings for each other, with him gifting her extra lives meant for him and her providing him with an illegal map of the game. Upon entering Level 3, Arnold and Juni are forced to battle. Juni loses almost all of his lives, but Demetra swaps places with him and is defeated, getting an immediate Game Over. With only half of his last life remaining, Juni is upset, but his grandpa reminds him not to fall in love with a game.

At Level 4, Juni reunites with Carmen. Carmen tells Juni that the Toymaker is the reason their grandfather uses a wheelchair. Fearing that Valentin might seek revenge and release the Toymaker, Donnagon attempts to prevent the group from reaching Level 5 but fails. As the other gamers start to suspect Carmen and Juni of being deceivers, the real Guy appears, gives a rousing speech, and confidently walks into Level 5, only to enter a trap, which instantly depletes all 99 of his lives, giving him a Game Over.

Demetra inexplicably returns, and Carmen identifies her as "The Deceiver", a program used to mislead players and thus not a real person. Demetra apologizes to Juni before the Toymaker attacks them with giant, ape-like robots, intending to keep them trapped in the game forever. Demetra helps the group escape back into the real world. Upon return, it is revealed that Valentin has released the Toymaker into the real world with them; the villain's robot ape army from Level 5 attacks the city.

Juni and Carmen summon their family to help but with too many robots to handle, Juni, remembering Gerti Giggles telling him that everyone is his family, calls out for everyone to help; this summons Fegan Floop, Minion, the robot children, Dinky Winks and his son, Romero, Gary Giggles, and Gerti. As soon as all robot apes are destroyed, the Toymaker's lead robot arrives. Valentin confronts The Toymaker and forgives him for the accident he caused. The Toymaker, emotional from Valentin's forgiveness, shuts down and destroys his own robot, and joins the rest of the Cortez family and their friends in celebrating.

== Cast ==
- Antonio Banderas as Gregorio Cortez
- Carla Gugino as Ingrid Cortez
- Alexa PenaVega as Carmen Cortez
- Daryl Sabara as Juni Cortez
- Ricardo Montalbán as Valentin
- Holland Taylor as Helga
- Mike Judge as Donnagon Giggles
- Matt O'Leary as Gary Giggles
- Emily Osment as Gerti Giggles
- Cheech Marin as Felix
- Bobby Edner as Francis
- Courtney Jines as Demetra
- Ryan Pinkston as Arnold
- Danny Trejo as Machete
- Alan Cumming as Floop
- Tony Shalhoub as Minion
- Sylvester Stallone as Toymaker
- Salma Hayek as Francesca Giggles
- Steve Buscemi as Romero
- Bill Paxton as Dinky Winks
- George Clooney as Devlin
- Elijah Wood as The Guy
- Selena Gomez as "water park girl"
- Glen Powell as "long-fingered boy"
- James Paxton as Dinky Winks Jr.

== Production ==
=== Filming ===
Filming took place from January 10, 2003, to April 2003.

Green screen was widely used, with about 90% of the film being green screen footage.

== Music ==
The film score was composed by Robert Rodriguez and is the first score for which he takes solo credit. Rodriguez also performs in the "Game Over" band, playing guitar, bass, keyboard, and drums, including the title track, "Game Over", performed by Alexa Vega.

All selections were composed by Rodriguez and performed by the Texas Philharmonic Orchestra, conducted by George Oldziey and Rodriguez.

1. "Game Over" (vocals by Alexa Vega)
2. "Thumb Thumbs"
3. "Pogoland"
4. "Robot Arena"
5. "Metal Battle"
6. "Toymaker"
7. "Mega Racer"
8. "Programmerz"
9. "Bonus Life"
10. "Cyber Staff Battle"
11. "Tinker Toys"
12. "Lava Monster Rock"
13. "The Real Guy"
14. "Orbit"
15. "Welcome to the Game"
16. "Heart Drive" (performed by Bobby Edner and Alexa Vega)
17. "Game Over (Level 5 Mix)" (performed by Alexa Vega)
18. "Isle of Dreams (Cortez Mix)" (performed by Alexa Vega)
- Tracks 17–18 were produced by Dave Curtin for DeepMix.

== Release ==
=== Home media ===
The film was released via VHS and DVD on February 24, 2004, by Miramax Home Entertainment (under the Dimension Home Video banner). The film's 3-D effect was not removable on the DVD release, but a 2D version (Spy Kids 3: Game Over) was available on a second disc, on VHS, and on television airings. In April 2011, the film was re-released on DVD, but only in 2D and named Spy Kids 3: Game Over.

The 2D version was released via Blu-ray on August 2, 2011. On December 4, 2012, Lionsgate released the 3D version as a double feature with The Adventures of Sharkboy and Lavagirl on Blu-ray 3D.

== Reception ==
=== Box office ===
Spy Kids 3-D: Game Over opened theatrically on July 25, 2003, in 3,344 venues, earning $33,417,739 in its first weekend and ranking first at the North American box office. It is the series' highest-grossing opening weekend. The film ended its run on February 5, 2004, having grossed $111,761,982 domestically and $85,250,000 internationally for a worldwide total of $197,011,982, making it the best-performing film in the series.

=== Critical response ===
Spy Kids 3-D: Game Over received mixed reviews from critics. Review aggregation website Rotten Tomatoes gives the film a 45% approval rating based on 143 reviews, with an average rating of 5.42/10. The website's critical consensus states "The movie will be found wanting if one is not taken in by the 3-D visuals". Metacritic reports a 57/100 rating based on 30 critics, indicating "mixed or average reviews". Audiences polled by CinemaScore gave the film an average grade of "B+" on an A+ to F scale.

Bob Longino of the Atlanta Journal-Constitution wrote that "the 3-D process will hurt your eyes. The onscreen characters, who also wear 3-D glasses, even say so when it's time to take them off". However, he also stated that it helped mask what he deemed as an overall lack of a story. Jim Lane of Sacramento News and Review called the 3D scenes "murky and purple like a window smeared with grape jell-o". Roger Ebert gave the film one and a half stars out of four, suggesting that perhaps Rodriguez was held back by the film's technical constraints. Ebert also admitted to showing disdain for the 3D gimmick, saying that the picture quality with the 3D glasses is more murky and washed out than the crisper and more colorful 2D films. Mick LaSalle of the San Francisco Chronicle noted Carmen's absence for much of the film and criticized the plot's repeated scenes of Juni attempting over and over again to reach Level Five. Kimberly Jones of the Austin City Chronicle praised the visuals but called the plot twig-thin and stated that the parents' near absence in the story makes Rodriguez's continuing theme of family ties seem much less resonant than in the other films.

For his performance as The Toymaker, Sylvester Stallone earned a Golden Raspberry Award for Worst Supporting Actor at John J. B. Wilson's 2003 Golden Raspberry Awards ceremony.

== Sequel ==
In 2005, Robert was thinking of plans for an animated direct-to-DVD sequel, but it never went into pre-production and was simply an idea.

The film was eventually followed up in 2011 by a fourth film in the series, Spy Kids: All the Time in the World.

== Other media ==
=== Novelization ===
Talk Miramax Books released a novelization of the movie in June 2003. The novel was written by the children's book author Kitty Richards. The posters and end of the credits even say "Read the Talk/Miramax Books", telling the viewers to read the print retelling.

=== Video games ===
Two tie-in video games for the movie were released: one for the Game Boy Advance, developed by Digital Eclipse, and one for Microsoft Windows, developed by InLight Entertainment.

== In popular culture ==
In "Episode 1" of the ninth season of the sketch comedy series Mad TV, 50 Cent (played by Aries Spears) raps about 2003's lackluster summer blockbuster films and sequels in a parody of "P.I.M.P". One of the films brought up is Spy Kids 3-D: Game Over, commenting on how the lead actors were above the age of being considered "kids".

In "The Never-Ending Stories" episode of the animated TV series American Dad! (Season 15, Episode 9), CIA agent Stan Smith tells the class he is teaching that he is the only contributor to the Wikipedia article on Spy Kids 3-D: Game Over.
