= Spy Kids: All the Time in the World =

2011 film by Robert Rodriguez

- Theatrical release poster
- Directed by: Robert Rodriguez
- Written by: Robert Rodriguez
- Produced by: Robert Rodriguez; Elizabeth Avellán
- Starring: Jessica Alba; Joel McHale; Alexa Vega; Daryl Sabara; Rowan Blanchard; Mason Cook; Ricky Gervais; Jeremy Piven
- Cinematography: Robert Rodriguez; Jimmy Lindsey
- Edited by: Dan Zimmerman
- Music by: Robert Rodriguez; Carl Thiel
- Production company: Troublemaker Studios
- Distributed by: Dimension Films
- Release dates: July 31, 2011 (L.A. Live); August 19, 2011 (United States)
- Running time: 89 minutes
- Country: United States
- Language: English
- Budget: $27 million
- Box office: $85.6 million

Spy Kids: All the Time in the World is a 2011 American 4D spy action comedy film written and directed by Robert Rodriguez. It is the fourth in the Spy Kids film series. The film stars Jessica Alba, Joel McHale, Alexa Vega, Daryl Sabara, Rowan Blanchard, Mason Cook, Ricky Gervais, and Jeremy Piven, with Vega and Sabara reprising their roles from the first three films.

Spy Kids: All the Time in the World premiered at L.A. Live in Los Angeles, California on July 31, 2011, and was released in the United States on August 19, by Dimension Films. The film used "Aroma-scope", which allowed audiences to smell aromas from the film through scratch and sniff cards. It received generally negative reviews from critics who felt that the franchise had run its course. It grossed $86 million worldwide against a budget of $27 million, becoming the lowest-grossing film in the series. A fifth film, Spy Kids: Armageddon, was released in 2023.

== Plot ==
OSS agent Marissa Wilson is attempting to capture a criminal named Tick Tock, who purchases a mini-disk containing information of a dangerous weapon called Project Armageddon, stolen from the OSS. Despite being nine months pregnant and going into labor, she continues her pursuit against the orders of her boss Danger D'Amo. Tick Tock is captured and the mini disk is retrieved.

At the hospital, Marissa meets her spy-hunting TV host husband, Wilbur, and her two stepchildren, twins Rebecca and Cecil. Marissa gives birth to a daughter, Maria. A year later, Wilbur has created a five-year plan in which if his show is successful, he will spend more time with the kids. Rebecca, refusing to accept Marissa as a replacement for her late mother, plays pranks on her, but Marissa gives her a red sapphire necklace in an attempt to connect with her.

One night, the media reports that time is accelerating at an alarming rate. A criminal mastermind known as the Time Keeper claims responsibility, threatening to unleash Project Armageddon as retribution against a society he believes wastes time in trivial pursuits rather than cherishing with their loved ones. He demands that Tick Tock bring him the Chronos Sapphire, which is revealed to be the jewel in the necklace Marissa gave to Rebecca. The OSS calls Marissa out of retirement and instructs her to bring the Sapphire with her, further straining her relationship with Rebecca.

At OSS Headquarters, Marissa discovers that Rebecca has swapped the Sapphire with baby food. Soon after, Tick Tock's henchmen break into Marissa's house, prompting Rebecca and Cecil to take refuge in a Panic Room, where they discover a video of Marissa informing them of her secret career and that their dog Argonaut is a weaponized talking robot. The twins escape to OSS, where Marissa's niece and their stepcousin, Carmen Cortez, gives the twins a tour of the defunct Spy Kids Division, allowing each to take a gadget as a souvenir.

Pursuing after the Time Keeper, the twin's search leads them to a clock shop that serves as Tick Tock's secret lair. There, they watch footage of the Wells Experiment, a time travel experiment, and learn the true nature of the Chronos in Rebecca's necklace, as it saved a boy who was frozen in time by the experiment. The twins are captured by Tick Tock but are rescued by Marissa and Carmen, though Tick Tock manages to steal the Chronos. Wilbur begins an investigation to capture his first spy and unknowingly captures footage of his family fighting off the Time Keeper's henchmen. Shocked to learn that his wife is a spy, he gets fired when he destroys the footage that he and his cameraman filmed of the battle and becomes estranged from Marissa and the twins.

As time speeds up, OSS agents are briefed on the now-defunct Wells Experiment, with its device kept under strict lockdown. Assigned to the case is Carmen’s estranged brother, Juni Cortez. The twins call out Danger for his watch looking just like the Time Keeper’s, and point out that his name is actually an anagram of “Armageddon.” Danger reveals he is the Time Keeper and locks them in their room. Later, when OSS agents led by Marissa, Carmen, and Juni return to the clock shop to face him, the Time Keeper uses circuits hidden in their ID badges to freeze them in time, spreading the effect to multiple cities.

Juni, spared from being frozen when Carmen discarded his ID badge in anger, successfully rescues Marissa and Carmen. Danger reveals that the Armageddon Device was created for time travel, disclosing that his father led the Wells Experiment and that he himself was the boy frozen in time. His father spent the remainder of his life trying, without success, to free him. The OSS ultimately terminated the experiment using the Chronos. Now, Danger plans to use the Armageddon Device to return to the past and spend more time with his father.

Cecil deduces that Danger has tried this many times before, always ending up worse off. Danger then reveals that Tick Tock and his minions are actually alternate versions of himself. Rebecca tells him to value the time he has rather than constantly chasing after more. When the time vortex opens, Danger steps through to meet his father but returns as an old man, finally admitting Cecil was right. He powers off the device, while Wilbur catches Tick Tock and reunites with Marissa and the kids, vowing to make time for them rather than waiting for it.

Meanwhile, Carmen and Juni announce that they'll co-lead a revived Spy Kids program, with Rebecca and Cecil becoming recruiters for the new agents, including the audience and various kids around the world.

== Cast ==
- Rowan Blanchard as Rebecca Wilson, Wilbur's daughter and Marissa's stepdaughter.
- Mason Cook as Cecil Wilson, Wilbur's son and Marissa's stepson who has hearing loss.
- Jessica Alba as Marissa Wilson (née Cortez), Rebecca and Cecil's stepmother, Gregorio and Machete's sister, and Carmen and Juni's paternal aunt.
- Joel McHale as Wilbur Wilson, Marissa's spy-hunting reporter husband.
- Alexa Vega as Carmen Cortez, a top-secret agent for the OSS, Juni's sister, and former Spy Kid.
- Daryl Sabara as Juni Cortez, Carmen's brother, a formerly retired OSS agent and former Spy Kid.
- Ricky Gervais as the voice of Argonaut, Rebecca and Cecil's robot dog.
- Jeremy Piven as Dane "Danger" D'Amo/Timekeeper, the leader of OSS who becomes a supervillain. Piven also portrays Tick-Tock, the Timekeeper's second in command, as well as Professor D'Amo (Danger's father) and the Time Keeper's henchmen.

Additionally, Belle and Genny Solorzano portray Maria Wilson/Spy Baby, Marissa and Wilbur's daughter, and Rebecca and Cecil's half-sister. Danny Trejo portrays Isador "Machete" Cortez, Carmen and Juni's uncle and Marissa's brother and Angela Lanza portrays Female Spy OSS Agent.

== Production ==
=== Development ===
A different fourth Spy Kids movie was thought of by Robert Rodriguez, which would have been animated and direct-to-DVD, but it never materialized.

Years later, Rodriguez was prompted by an incident on the set of Machete (a stand-alone film focusing on the Spy Kids supporting character of the same name) to start envisioning a fourth main film in the Spy Kids series. Star Jessica Alba had her then-one year old baby Honor Marie and was dressed to appear on camera when her baby's diaper "exploded". Watching Alba change the diaper while trying not to get anything on her clothes prompted Rodriguez to think "What about a spy mom?" Production on the film was officially announced in September 2009, six years after the release of Spy Kids 3-D: Game Over, by Dimension Films. The script for the film was completed by Robert Rodriguez in December the same year. The title for the film was officially revealed as Spy Kids: All the Time in the World as well as an August 2011 release window, which was later updated to an August 19 release date.

=== Filming ===
Filming began on October 27, 2010 and concluded in February 2011.

== Release ==
=== Home media ===
The film was released on DVD, Blu-ray, 3D Blu-ray and on DVD + Blu-ray + Digital Copy combo packs on November 22, 2011.

== Reception ==
=== Box office ===
The film took in $4 million on its opening day and $11 million over the three-day weekend, debuting in third place behind The Help and Rise of the Planet of the Apes. That was on the low end of expectations, but an executive of The Weinstein Company said: "We're okay with this number. We're going to be in good shape with this film, and it will play for the rest of the summer". The following weekend, it dropped 48% to $6 million, and took sixth place, and on the following weekend, it earned an additional $6.8 million over the four-day Labor Day Weekend. As of November 2011, the film earned $38 million in the U.S. and $47 million in other countries for a worldwide gross of $85 million, becoming the poorest performing film in the series.

=== Critical response ===
On Rotten Tomatoes, Spy Kids: All the Time in the World has an approval rating of 23% based on 61 reviews, with an average rating of 3.9/10. The website's critics consensus states: "Burdened by a rote plot and unfunny scatological humor, All the Time in the World suggests that the Spy Kids franchise has run its course." On Metacritic it has a weighted average score of 37 out of 100 based on 14 critics, indicating "generally unfavorable reviews". Audiences polled by CinemaScore gave the film an average grade of "B+" on an A+ to F scale.

Common Sense Media gave the film 1 out of 5 stars, writing: "Positive messages can't save [the] worst film in action series".

=== Accolades ===
Year	Award	Category	Nominee	Result
2011	ALMA Award	Favorite Movie		Won
2012	Blimp Award	Favorite Butt Kicker	Jessica Alba	Nominated
2012	Young Artist Award	Best Performance in a Feature Film - Supporting Young Actor and Best Performance in a Feature Film - Young Actress Ten and Under	Mason Cook and Rowan Blanchard	Nominated

== Sequel ==
Dimension Films had announced the fifth installment in the Spy Kids film series, shortly following the release of All the Time in the World, with intentions to have the cast return in their respective roles. However, the project entered development hell, and with the movie's new children actors Rowan Blanchard and Mason Cook aging through the years, the project was seemingly abandoned.

By January 2021 however, a relaunch of the franchise was announced as being in development, as a Netflix exclusive film. Robert Rodriguez returned as director, in addition to serving as co-writer with his son Racer Max. The project was a joint-venture production between Skydance Media and Spyglass Media Group. Netflix acquired the distribution rights for the film. Gina Rodriguez, Zachary Levi, Everly Carganilla, Connor Esterson and Billy Magnussen serve as the starring family of the production. The filmmaker later explained that Armageddon incorporated a new family because so much time had passed since All the Time in the World, and so he wanted to incorporate a new set of characters before returning to what came before.

=== Future ===
In September 2023, Rodriguez confirmed that Netflix intends to develop additional Spy Kids movies, with the filmmaker expressing hope to begin production on a sequel the following year. Rodriguez confirmed that he intends to bring back "legacy characters" from the previous installments in any future movies.

== Animated television series ==
An animated series based on the films, Spy Kids: Mission Critical, was released in 2018 on Netflix.

== Notes ==
1. The Walt Disney Company had to cut their own share with The Weinstein Company to 5% after the latter party lost their bid to reclaim Miramax Films.
