= Troublemaker Studios =

American film production company

- Formerly: Los Hooligans Productions (1991–2000)
- Type: Private
- Industry: Film; Television
- Founded: 1991; 35 years ago
- Founders: Robert Rodriguez; Elizabeth Avellán
- Headquarters: Austin, Texas, United States
- Owners: Robert Rodriguez; Elizabeth Avellán
- Divisions: Troublemaker Digital Studios; Troublemaker Sound
- Subsidiaries: El Chingon Inc.; El Chingon Productions, LP; El Chingon Investments, LP; El Rey Productions; Fifth Brain Inc.; Quick Draw Productions; Quick Draw Animation; Quick Draw Holdings; Rocket Racing Rebels Record Co.; Rodriguez International Pictures; Double R Productions
- Website: troublemakerstudios.com

Troublemaker Studios is an American independent production company founded and owned by filmmaker Robert Rodriguez and producer Elizabeth Avellán.

The company is based in Austin, Texas, and is at the former site of the Robert Mueller Municipal Airport. It shares space with Austin Studios, which is managed by the Austin Film Society, and houses production offices, sound stages and the largest green screen in Texas.

== Background ==
The company was founded in 1991 as Los Hooligans Productions, taking its name from Rodriguez's own comic strip, Los Hooligans, which he wrote and illustrated for three years while attending the University of Texas at Austin. Rodriguez chose the name so fans of the strip would recognize it when they saw his films. Since the 1990s, the studio has partnered with distributor Dimension Films on numerous projects; including the From Dusk till Dawn films and Once Upon a Time in Mexico, the third film in the Mexico Trilogy.

The company was reincorporated as Troublemaker Studios in 2000. 2001's Spy Kids, a family-oriented film, was considered the studio's first breakthrough hit. It has since spawned a long-running media franchise, including sequels and an animated series.

On August 12, 2021, the company had signed a deal with HBO and its HBO Max streaming service.

== Filmography ==
=== Feature films ===
Title	Release date	Co-production with	Distributor	Notes
as Los Hooligans Productions
Bedhead	1991	—N/a	—N/a	Short film
El Mariachi	February 26, 1993	—N/a	Columbia Pictures	
Roadracers	July 22, 1994	—N/a	Showtime Network	
Desperado	August 25, 1995	Columbia Pictures	Sony Pictures Releasing	
Four Rooms	December 25, 1995	A Band Apart	Miramax Films	
From Dusk till Dawn	January 19, 1996	A Band Apart	Dimension Films	
The Faculty	December 25, 1998	—N/a	Dimension Films	
From Dusk Till Dawn 2: Texas Blood Money	March 16, 1999	A Band Apart	Dimension Films; Buena Vista Home Entertainment	direct-to-video
From Dusk Till Dawn 3: The Hangman's Daughter	March 16, 1999	A Band Apart	Dimension Films; Buena Vista Home Entertainment	direct-to-video
as Troublemaker Studios
Spy Kids	March 30, 2001	—N/a	Dimension Films	
Spy Kids 2: The Island of Lost Dreams	August 7, 2002	—N/a	Dimension Films	
Spy Kids 3-D: Game Over	July 25, 2003	—N/a	Dimension Films	
Once Upon a Time in Mexico	September 12, 2003	—N/a	Columbia Pictures; Dimension Films	
Sin City	April 1, 2005	—N/a	Dimension Films	
The Adventures of Sharkboy and Lavagirl in 3-D	June 10, 2005	—N/a	Columbia Pictures; Dimension Films	
Grindhouse Planet Terror Death Proof	April 6, 2007	Rodriguez International Pictures	Dimension Films	
Shorts	August 21, 2009	Imagination Abu Dhabi; Media Rights Capital	Warner Bros. Pictures	
Predators	July 9, 2010	Davis Entertainment	20th Century Fox	
Machete	September 3, 2010	Overnight Productions; Hyde Park Entertainment	20th Century Fox; Sony Pictures Releasing International	
The Black Mamba	February 19, 2011	RadicalMedia	Nike	Short film
Spy Kids: All the Time in the World	August 19, 2011	—N/a	Dimension Films	
Sin City: A Dame to Kill For	August 22, 2014	Aldamisa Entertainment; Miramax Films; Solipsist Films	Dimension Films	
Sock 'Em Dead	2015	Rodriguez International Pictures; Happy Socks	—N/a	
Alita: Battle Angel	February 14, 2019	Lightstorm Entertainment	20th Century Fox	
Red 11	March 15, 2019	Double R Productions		
UglyDolls	May 3, 2019	Reel FX Animation; Alibaba Pictures; Huaxia Film Distribution; Original Force	STX Entertainment	
Spy Kids: Armageddon	September 22, 2023	Skydance Media; Spyglass Media Group	Netflix	
Upcoming
The Naughty List	TBA	Paramount Animation	Paramount Pictures	

=== Television series ===
Title	Premiere date	End date	Co-production with	Network	Notes
The Director's Chair	May 10, 2014	present	Skip Film; FactoryMade Ventures	El Rey Network	
Spy Kids: Mission Critical	April 20, 2018	November 30, 2018	Mainframe Studios; Dimension Television	Netflix	

== Divisions and subsidiaries ==
=== Rodriguez International Pictures ===
Rodriguez International Pictures logo

In the beginning of 2005, Rodriguez launched Rodriguez International Pictures (R.I.P), a film and television production company that mainly focuses on the horror genre. Its name pays homage to the low-budget production company American International Pictures.

Filmography:

- Curandero: Dawn of the Demon (2005) (direct-to-video) (distributed by Dimension Films, Miramax and Lionsgate Home Entertainment)
- Grindhouse (April 6, 2007) (distributed by Dimension Films)
  Logo with Pepino
  - Planet Terror (co-production with Troublemaker Studios)
  - Death Proof (co-production with Troublemaker Studios)
- El Mariachi (2014) (co-production with Teleset Colombia and Sony Pictures Television; distributed by Sony Pictures Television International)
- From Dusk till Dawn: The Series (2014–15) (co-production with Sugarcane Entertainment and FactoryMade Ventures; distributed by Miramax and Entertainment One)
- Matador (2014) (co-production with K/O Paper Products and FactoryMade Ventures; distributed by Entertainment One)
- Lucha Underground (2014–2018) (co-production with MGM Television, FactoryMade Ventures and AG Studios)
- Sock 'Em Dead (2015) (short film) (co-production with Troublemaker Studios in association with Happy Socks)

=== Quick Draw Productions ===
Quick Draw Productions logo

In 2010, Rodriguez launched Quick Draw Productions, a production and financing company that would allow him greater freedom to develop and produce film and television projects. Aaron Kaufman and Iliana Nikolic are his partners in the venture. In 2012, an animation division, Quick Draw Animation, was launched. Both companies are based at Troublemaker Studios.

Filmography:

- Two Scoops (2013) (short film) (in association with BlackBerry)
- Machete Kills (October 11, 2013) (co-production with A.R. Films, Aldamisa Entertainment, Demarest Films, Overnight Productions and 1821 Pictures; distributed by Open Road Films)

=== Double R Productions ===
In 2020, Rodriguez launched Double R Productions, a film company that co-creates films for other companies.

Filmography:

- We Can Be Heroes (December 25, 2020) (distributed by Netflix)
- Happier Than Ever: A Love Letter to Los Angeles (September 3, 2021) (co-production with Interscope Films, Darkroom Productions, Nexus Studios and Aron Levine Productions; distributed by Disney+)
- Hypnotic (May 12, 2023) (co-production with Studio 8, Solstice Studios, Ingenious Media and Hoosegow Productions; distributed by Ketchup Entertainment in the United States and Warner Bros. Pictures in the United Kingdom)

== See also ==
- El Rey Network
