= Spy Kids 2: The Island of Lost Dreams =

2002 film by Robert Rodriguez

- Theatrical release poster
- Directed by: Robert Rodriguez
- Written by: Robert Rodriguez
- Produced by: Elizabeth Avellán; Robert Rodriguez
- Starring: Antonio Banderas; Carla Gugino; Alexa Vega; Daryl Sabara; Mike Judge; Ricardo Montalbán; Holland Taylor; Christopher McDonald; Cheech Marin; Steve Buscemi
- Cinematography: Robert Rodriguez
- Edited by: Robert Rodriguez
- Music by: Robert Rodriguez; John Debney
- Production company: Troublemaker Studios
- Distributed by: Dimension Films
- Release dates: July 28, 2002 (Grauman's Chinese Theatre); August 7, 2002 (United States); September 18, 2002 (United Kingdom)
- Running time: 100 minutes
- Country: United States
- Language: English
- Budget: $38 million
- Box office: $119 million

Spy Kids 2: The Island of Lost Dreams is a 2002 American spy action comedy film co-produced, written, shot, edited, co-composed, and directed by Robert Rodriguez. It is the sequel to Spy Kids (2001) and the second installment in the Spy Kids film series. The film stars Antonio Banderas, Carla Gugino, Alexa Vega, Daryl Sabara, Mike Judge, Ricardo Montalbán, Holland Taylor, Christopher McDonald, Cheech Marin, Steve Buscemi, and introducing Emily Osment in her film debut. It tells the story of Carmen and Juni heading to a mysterious island filled with hybrid creatures to recover a stolen device while competing against two rival agents.

Spy Kids 2: The Island of Lost Dreams premiered at the Grauman's Chinese Theatre in Los Angeles, California on July 28, 2002, and was released in the United States on August 7, by Dimension Films. The film received generally positive reviews from critics and grossed over $119 million worldwide against a production budget of $38 million. A sequel, Spy Kids 3-D: Game Over, was released in 2003.

== Plot ==
Carmen and Juni Cortez are now full-time agents of the OSS' new Spy Kids Division. They face fierce competition from Gary and Gerti, Donnagon Giggles' children. After the Giggles siblings outperform them on a mission to rescue the President of the United States's daughter, Alexandra, at Dinky Winks's theme park, Troublemakers, Carmen defends Gary, straining her relationship with Juni.

At the OSS awards banquet, Donnagon hacks into the President's teleprompter and is named director of the OSS instead of Gregorio Cortez. Shortly after, the adults are incapacitated by a group of "Magna Men", who are after the "Transmooker", a device that can shut off all electronic devices. Gary causes Juni to drop the Transmooker in a scuffle, allowing the Magna Men to steal it. Gary blames Juni for the theft causing Donnagan to fire him from the OSS, much to Gregorio's objection.

The next morning, Carmen hacks into the database, reinstates Juni's agent status, and assigns them to recover the Transmooker, which was originally assigned to Gary and Gerti. They find a mysterious island where no electronics work. Meanwhile, Gary and Gerti are rerouted to the Gobi Desert and while trying to pinpoint their position fall into a pit of camel feces, whereupon they swear revenge on the Cortezes.

Shortly after reaching the island, Carmen and Juni meet Romero, a scientist who attempted to create miniaturized hybrid animals to sell. He accidentally doused them with a growth concoction, causing them to increase in size. He also reveals that he created the Transmooker to hide his island, meaning that the stolen Transmooker was a prototype and the real one is on the island. Too afraid of the large creatures roaming around, Romero shows Carmen and Juni the way to the real Transmooker.

After being informed of their disappearance, Gregorio and Ingrid begin tracking down Carmen and Juni, joined by Ingrid's parents.

Carmen is captured by a flying pig and dropped into its nest with Gerti, who tells her that Gary is genuinely evil. Juni befriends a spider-monkey and comes across Gary, who has befriended a slizard. When Gary attacks Juni, Carmen incapacitates him. Encouraged by Juni, Romero leaves his lab and finds his creatures much friendlier than he thought. Carmen and Juni eventually find and recover the Transmooker, eliminating the cloaking around the island, and are surprised when their family joins them. Donnagon then confronts the group, takes the Transmooker and, after a fight with Gregorio, tries to destroy the Cortez family with it, but it malfunctions. Gerti reveals she sabotaged it and threatens Donnagon with telling everything to her mother, which he detests. Romero arrives alongside his creatures and destroys the prototype Transmooker as well.

The President and his staff arrive on the island. He and his daughter fire Donnagon, Gary is temporarily disavowed, and Alexandra appoints Gregorio as director of the OSS. Even though he is offered a promotion, Juni resigns due to the impersonal treatment he had received by the OSS after being framed. As the Cortez family leaves the island, Romero gives Juni a miniature spider-monkey as a gift, and the island's inhabitants bid farewell to the Cortez family.

During the credits, Isador "Machete" Cortez hosts a concert featuring Carmen (with a microphone which helps her sing and a belt that helps her dance), and Juni (with a guitar that plays itself), but realizes too late that he never put any batteries in the devices before they went onstage. When he breaks this news to Carmen and Juni, this shocks them, realizing they have musical talent. As the credits come to a close, Dinky Winks paddles to Romero's island to offer a business deal and nearly has his hand bitten off by a slizard.

== Cast ==
- Antonio Banderas as Gregorio Cortez, the father of Juni and Carmen, who is now called back to the OSS
- Carla Gugino as Ingrid Cortez, the mother of Juni and Carmen, who, like Gregorio, is also called back to the OSS
- Alexa Vega as Carmen Cortez, daughter of Gregorio and Ingrid, who is now an OSS member of their spy kid division
- Daryl Sabara as Juni Cortez, son of Gregorio and Ingrid and Carmen's younger brother, also a member of the OSS's spy kid division
- Mike Judge as Donnagon Giggles, an OSS agent turned director who was previously rescued by Carmen and Juni but is now seeking world domination
- Ricardo Montalbán as Grandfather Valentin Avellan
- Holland Taylor as Grandmother Helga Avellan
- Christopher McDonald as the President of the United States
- Danny Trejo as Isador "Machete" Cortez, gadget inventor and uncle of Carmen and Juni
- Alan Cumming as Fegan Floop, the host of Floop's Fooglies
- Tony Shalhoub as Alexander Minion, Floop's assistant who is still in his Fooglie state since the last film
- Matt O'Leary as Gary Giggles, the son of Donnagon Giggles, a rival OSS agent of Juni and Carmen's love interest
- Taylor Momsen as Alexandra Anami, the President's daughter
- Emily Osment as Gerti Giggles, daughter of Donnagon Giggles and a rival OSS agent of Carmen
- Cheech Marin as Felix Gumm, an OSS agent
- Steve Buscemi as Romero, a scientist and creator of the Transmooker device who created the hybrid animals
- Bill Paxton as Dinky Winks, the owner of the theme park Troublemakers

== Production ==
Spy Kids 2 was filmed on a comparatively low budget of $38 million. Robert Rodriguez requested the same budget as the first Spy Kids. In exchange, he asked for more creative freedom: "[Y]ou save so much money that you get in return ... a lot of creative freedom, I mean total creative freedom". He wanted "an old-fashioned Ray Harryhausen adventure" with a "more old-school" look.

To save money, Rodriguez acted as his own production designer and cinematographer. He said no D.P. wanted to film on digital video. He re-used props and sets between shots, with editing and post-production creating the illusion of a more lavish production. For example, in the large ship that Banderas and Gugino use, there was only one captain's chair. Gugino's image was flipped; Rodriguez intentionally didn't change her hair part so audiences could notice the effect.

Spy Kids 2 was filmed entirely on High Definition digital video, a crucial decision for Rodriguez. After seeing George Lucas using digital video for Star Wars: Episode II – Attack of the Clones, Rodriguez tested the technology during re-shoots for the first Spy Kids film. He thought the digital video transferred to film looked better than traditional film. Rodriguez used the cameras unfiltered.

=== Special effects ===
Spy Kids 2 has over twice the amount of special effects than the first film. Rodriguez picked some visual effects companies who were eager and less established, as well as starting up his own Troublemaker Studios, and reemploying Hybrid, who had worked with him on the first film. Gregor Punchatz, the film's lead animator, removed motion blur for the computer generated creatures. In doing so, the clean image resembled the stop-motion work of filmmaker Ray Harryhausen, who has a cameo in the film and a "special thanks" credit. The scene with the army of live skeletons was shot on a real rock formation, with the two young actors on safety wires and the computer generated skeletons added later to over three dozen shots.

=== Filming sites ===
- Arenal Lake, Costa Rica
- Austin, Texas, USA
- Big Bend National Park, Texas, USA
- Manuel Antonio, Costa Rica
- San Antonio, Texas, USA
- Six Flags Over Texas, Arlington, Texas, USA

== Music ==
The film score was co-written by director Robert Rodriguez and composer John Debney, who had also co-written the score for Spy Kids. The sound is a mix of rock, pop, and indie rock, and includes songs performed by Alan Cumming and Alexa Vega. Unusually, the orchestral score was recorded in the auditorium of a local high school in Austin, Georgetown High School. according to the soundtrack linear notes, the film's music was meant to pay homage to the music of Ray Harryhausen's films composed by Bernard Herrmann, particularly The 7th Voyage of Sinbad and Jason and the Argonauts.

All tracks were composed by Debney and Rodriguez and performed by the Texas Philharmonic Orchestra.

1. "The Juggler"
2. "Spy Ballet"
3. "Magna Men"
4. "Treehouse"
5. "R.A.L.P.H."
6. "Floop's Dream" (performed by Alan Cumming)
7. "Escape from Dragon-spy"
8. "Spy-parents"
9. "Island of Lost Dreams"
10. "Donnagon's Big Office"/"The Giggles"
11. "Mysterious Volcano Island"
12. "Romero's Zoo Too"
13. "Mothership"/"SpyGrandparents"
14. "Magna Racers"
15. "Aztec Treasure Room"
16. "Skeletons"
17. "Creature Battle"
18. "Romero's Creatures"/"SpyBeach"
19. "SpyDad vs. SpyDad"/"Romero's Gift"
20. "Isle of Dreams" (performed by Alexa Vega)

Additional music not on the soundtrack album includes "Oye Como Spy", which is an adaptation of Tito Puente's "Oye Como Va", performed by Los Lobos (the song is on the soundtrack album from the first Spy Kids film).

== Release ==
=== Home media ===
The film was released on VHS and DVD in the United States on February 18, 2003, by Buena Vista Home Entertainment (under the Dimension Home Video banner). As of December 2003, the video sold 4 million copies earning a profit of over $68.8 million dollars. The film is also available to download on iTunes. A Blu-ray re-release was scheduled for August 2, 2011 to coincide with the fourth film.

== Reception ==
=== Box office ===
Spy Kids 2: The Island of Lost Dreams opened theatrically on August 7, 2002, in 3,307 venues and earned $16,711,716 in its first weekend, ranking third in the North American box office behind XXX and the second weekend of Signs. The film ended its run on January 12, 2003, having grossed $85,846,429 in the United States and Canada, and $33,876,929 overseas for a worldwide total of $119,723,358.

=== Critical response ===
On Rotten Tomatoes, Spy Kids 2: The Island of Lost Dreams has a 75% approval score based on 136 reviews and an average rating of 6.6/10. The site's critical consensus reads: "Though the concept is no longer fresh, Spy Kids 2 is still an agreeable and energetic romp". Metacritic reports a 66 out of 100 rating based on reviews from 29 critics, indicating "generally favorable reviews". Audiences polled by CinemaScore gave the film an average grade of "A-" on an A+ to F scale.

Roger Ebert gave the film 3 out of 4 stars and commented: "With Spy Kids 2: The Island of Lost Dreams, the Spy Kids franchise establishes itself as a durable part of the movie landscape: a James Bond series for kids". Kenneth Turan of the New York Times gave it 4 out of 5 stars said: "The movie is a gaudy, noisy thrill ride -- hyperactive, slightly out of control and full of kinetic, mischievous charm". Lisa Schwarzbaum of Entertainment Weekly wrote: "The antics are a tad more frantic, and the gizmos work overtime, as if ... Robert Rodriguez felt the hot breath of el diablo on his neck. On the other hand, the inventiveness is still superior and the network of fiends [sic] and family is extended". Michael Wilmington of Metro mix Chicago, noting how Rodriguez borrows many elements from television and earlier films, stated that "Rodriguez recycles and refurbishes all these old movie bits with the opportunistic energy of a man looting his old attic toy chest -- but he also puts some personal feeling into the movie. This is a film about families staying together, children asserting themselves and even, to some degree, Latino power".

== Sequels ==
It was followed up in 2003 by a third film in the series, Spy Kids 3-D: Game Over, in 2011 by a fourth film, Spy Kids: All the Time in the World, and in 2023 by a fifth film, Spy Kids: Armageddon.

== Novelization ==
Talk Miramax Books released a novelization of the film in June/July 2002. The novel was written by children's book author Kiki Thorpe. The posters and end of the credits even say "Read the Talk/Miramax Books", telling the viewers to read the print retelling.

== References in political philosophy ==
The movie was referenced in Aleksandr Dugin's 2009 book The Fourth Political Theory.
