= Elizabeth Avellán =

Venezuelan-American film producer

- Born: Elizabeth Avellán Veloz; November 8, 1960 (age 65); Caracas, Venezuela
- Other name: Elizabeth Rodriguez
- Occupations: Producer animator actress
- Years active: 1991–present
- Spouse: Robert Rodriguez (m. 1991; div. 2008)
- Children: 5

Elizabeth Avellán Veloz (born November 8, 1960) is a Venezuelan-born American film producer.

== Biography ==
Avellán was born in Caracas, Venezuela. Her grandfather, Gonzalo Veloz Mancera, created the first privately owned Venezuelan television station, Televisa. As a teenager, she moved together with her family to Houston, United States, where she graduated from Rice University.

She first worked as an administrative associate for Gerhard Fonken, an executive vice president of the University of Texas. In 1994, to prepare for the production of Desperado, she took production classes at UCLA.

She was the co-owner and vice president of Troublemaker Studios, the production company that she and her former husband, Robert Rodriguez, founded in 2000. In 2009, she worked in the film Shorts: The Adventures of the Wishing Rock where she voiced the baby who was portrayed by Bianca Rodriguez. Avellán was also executive producer of In and Out of Focus, a documentary about balancing motherhood and a career in the film business.

In September 2019, she bought the remake rights of The Whistler to create an English-language franchise of the movie with her production company Eya Productions. In January 2020, along with Rana Joy Glickman, Avellán launched the production company Tealhouse Entertainment. The Whistler franchise was to be produced by this new company.

== Other roles ==
- Member of the Academy of Motion Picture Arts and Sciences

== Awards ==
- 2007: Texas Film Hall of Fame Ann Richards Award

== Personal life ==
From 1989 to 2008, Avellán was married to Robert Rodriguez, whom she had met at the University of Texas at Austin in 1988. They have five children together.

== Filmography ==
=== Crew work ===
Year	Film	Credited as			
Year	Film	Producer	Actress	Animator	Other
1991	Bedhead			Yes	Yes
1992	El Mariachi	Yes			Yes
1995	Desperado	Yes			
1996	From Dusk till Dawn	Yes			
1997	Full Tilt Boogie				Yes
1997	Real Stories of the Donut Men	Yes			
1998	The Faculty	Yes			
1999	From Dusk Till Dawn 2: Texas Blood Money	Yes			
1999	From Dusk Till Dawn 3: The Hangman's Daughter	Yes			
1999	Outside Providence				Yes
2000	Hollywood Goes to Hell				Yes
2001	Spy Kids	Yes			
2002	In & Out of Focus				Yes
2002	Spy Kids 2: The Island of Lost Dreams	Yes			
2003	Once Upon a Time in Mexico	Yes			
2003	VH1: All Access				Yes
2003	Spy Kids 3-D: Game Over	Yes			
2005	Sin City	Yes			
2005	The Adventures of Sharkboy and Lavagirl in 3-D	Yes			
2005	Sin City: The Premiere				Yes
2005	Starz on the Set: Sin City				Yes
2005	Secuestro Express	Yes			
2005	Curandero	Yes			
2006	Hoodwinked!				Yes
2007	Truth in Terms of Beauty	Yes			
2007	Grindhouse	Yes			
2007	Death Proof	Yes			
2007	Planet Terror	Yes			
2008	The Kids of Widney High	Yes			
2008	Santos	Yes			
2009	Entre líneas	Yes			
2009	Shorts: The Adventures of the Wishing Rock	Yes	Yes		
2010	Machete	Yes			
2010	Predators	Yes			
2011	Spy Kids: All the Time in the World	Yes			
2012	Angels Sing	Yes			
2014	Sin City: A Dame to Kill For	Yes			
2023	Spy Kids: Armageddon	Yes			

=== Acting ===
Year	Title	Role	Note
2009	Shorts: The Adventures of the Wishing Rock	Baby (voice)	
