= Spy Kids: Armageddon =

2023 film by Robert Rodriguez

- Promotional release poster
- Directed by: Robert Rodriguez
- Written by: Robert Rodriguez; Racer Max
- Produced by: David Ellison; Dana Goldberg; Don Granger; Racer Max; Robert Rodriguez; Elizabeth Avellán
- Starring: Gina Rodriguez; Zachary Levi; Connor Esterson; Everly Carganilla; D. J. Cotrona; Billy Magnussen
- Cinematography: Robert Rodriguez
- Edited by: Robert Rodriguez
- Music by: Rebel Rodriguez; John Debney
- Production companies: Skydance; Spyglass Media Group; Troublemaker Studios
- Distributed by: Netflix
- Release date: September 22, 2023
- Running time: 97 minutes
- Country: United States
- Language: English

Spy Kids: Armageddon is a 2023 American spy action comedy film produced, shot, edited, and directed by Robert Rodriguez, who co-wrote it with his son, Racer Max. It is the standalone sequel to Spy Kids: All the Time in the World (2011) and the fifth main installment in the Spy Kids film series. The film stars Gina Rodriguez (no relation to the film's director), Zachary Levi, Connor Esterson, Everly Carganilla, D. J. Cotrona, and Billy Magnussen.

Spy Kids: Armageddon was released on September 22, 2023, by Netflix. The film received mixed reviews from critics.

== Plot ==
At present, Tony and Patty are trying to stop the launch of Armageddon.

Tony and Patty's parents, Terrence Tango and Nora Torrez, are spies and OSS agents, and their computers host the Armageddon code.

A day earlier, Terrence and Nora were assigned a new mission by their boss, Devlin, which leads them to a group led by a video game character named Heck Knight. Heck Knight steals Terrence's smartwatch and escapes.

Tony cheats in a competition to win a game called Hyskore. It is revealed that Heck Knight works for the creator of Hyskore, Rey Kingston (The King), who is trying to steal the Armageddon code. It is also revealed that Terrence created the Armageddon code. During the night, Nora decides to delete the Armageddon code to prevent it from falling into the wrong hands, but Rey steals the code when Tony and Patty launch Hyskore.

The next morning, Hyskore is installed on all smart devices across half of the Earth, and Terrence's family is attacked by Rey's men and Hyskore game characters. Terrence and Nora provide their kids with a vehicle, allowing them to reach a safe house. In the safe house, Tony and Patty undergo a spy training program while Terrence and Nora are captured by Rey. Rey defeats Terrence and Nora in a sword duel and realizes that the Armageddon code is divided into two halves, with the other half in Tony and Patty's possession. OSS agents led by Devlin find Tony and Patty at the safe house before Rey's men can reach them. At OSS headquarters, Tony and Patty help unlock the systems, inform Devlin about Rey, and track Terrence and Nora. Rey's men attack the OSS HQ and steal the Armageddon code. Tony and Patty then arrive at Rey's lair.

Terrence reveals to a disguised Rey that, during the fireball mission, he took Vargos's blueprint for a weapon but was unable to understand it. Tony, believing the blueprint to be a puzzle, solves it, which leads to the creation of the Armageddon code. Tony and Patty rescue Terrence and Nora. Rey tricks Tony into combining the two halves of the Armageddon code, revealing that Rey is Vargos's son. Rey launches the Armageddon code by entering the game through a VR pod and leaves the lair. Patty suggests entering the game to stop Rey. Tony, Patty, Terrence, and Nora use VR pods to enter the game. Tony fights and defeats Rey, halting the Armageddon code. Patty convinces Devlin not to arrest Rey. Devlin destroys the Armageddon code and recruits Tony and Patty as OSS agents.

After six months, Rey is helping people, and Terrence's family prepares for their next mission.

== Cast ==
- Gina Rodriguez as Nora Torrez
- Zachary Levi as Terrence Tango
- Connor Esterson as Antonio "Tony" Tango-Torrez
- Everly Carganilla as Patricia "Patty" Tango-Torrez
- D. J. Cotrona as Devlin
- Billy Magnussen as Rey Kingston
- Joe Schilling as the voice of Heck Knight
- Solar Dena Bennett and Fabiola Andújar as OSS Agents
- Isaac Garza as the tournament host
- Krystle Gutierrez as a newscaster

== Production ==
A reboot of the Spy Kids franchise was revealed to be in development in January 2021. Series creator Robert Rodriguez returns as writer and director; the project is a joint-venture production between Skydance Media, Spyglass Media Group, and Troublemaker Studios. Netflix acquired distribution rights the next year in March, making it the second Spy Kids project produced for the platform, while David Ellison, Dana Goldberg, Don Granger, Racer Max (Rodriguez's son), and Elizabeth Avellán (Rodriguez's ex-wife) joined as producers.

The title was revealed to be Spy Kids: Armageddon, which was the original name for the previous film installment, Spy Kids: All the Time in the World (2011). Along with the announcement of Max co-writing, and Rodriguez producing, the film's cast was revealed in the summer of 2022: Gina Rodriguez, Zachary Levi, Everly Carganilla, Connor Esterson, Billy Magnussen and D. J. Cotrona. Production wrapped in late August that same year.

== Release ==
Spy Kids: Armageddon was released in the United States on Netflix on September 22, 2023.

== Reception ==
On the review aggregator website Rotten Tomatoes, 54% of 37 critics' reviews are positive, with an average rating of 5.2/10. The website's consensus reads: "Spy Kids: Armageddon offers solidly diverting action for younger viewers, even if it's starting to feel like this franchise has run out of reasons to continue." Metacritic, which uses a weighted average, assigned the film a score of 55 out of 100, based on 10 critics, indicating "mixed or average" reviews.

Samantha Bergeson of IndieWire says it "will certainly appeal to kids today, the kind that fall into the pre-tween age group who still dream about joining the CIA. As spy boss Devlin says at the end of the film, it's simply onto the next mission for the Spy Kids family. Will that sequel rival Spy Kids 2? Stay tuned." Maggie Lovitt of Collider says it "may never be the generation-defining cult classic that its predecessors were, but it is still a long-overdue return to an unparalleled universe. In Rodriguez's world, hopepunk rules, and very few storytellers feel compelled to tell stories where there's unwavering optimism and hope for the future."

== Future ==
In September 2023, Rodriguez confirmed that Netflix intended to develop additional Spy Kids movies, with the filmmaker expressing hope to begin production on a sequel the following year. Rodriguez stated that Armageddon incorporated a new family because so much time had passed since All the Time in the World, and so he wanted to incorporate a new set of characters before returning to what came before; confirming that he intends to bring back "legacy characters" from the previous installments in future movies.
