= Fonda (band) =

American indie pop band

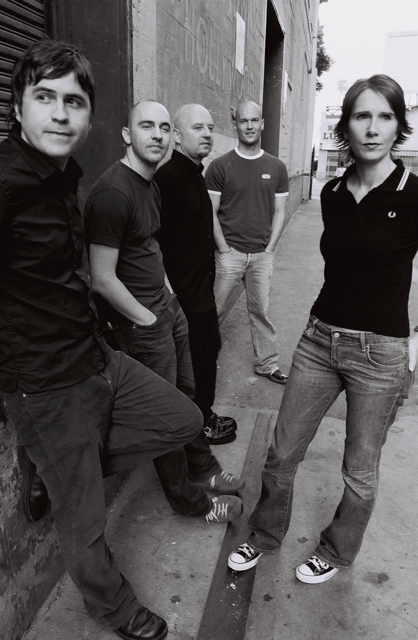

Background information
- Origin: Los Angeles, California, United States
- Genres: Indie pop Noise pop Dream pop
- Years active: 1994—2003, 2011—2013
- Labels: Minty Fresh; Hidden Agenda Records; Top Quality Records; Planting Seeds Records
- Members: Emily Cook; David Klotz; Johnny Joyner; Ginny Pitchford; Jason Crawford; John Broeckel
- Past members: Aaron Ryder (drums) (1995-2000); Aldo Bigante (bass) (1995-1998); Lora Paelicke (bass) (1999-2001); Dave Newton (guitars) (1998-2003); Adam Flanders (drums) (2000-2003)
- Website: www.fondamusic.com

Fonda is an American indie pop band from Los Angeles, California.

== History ==
The band formed in 1994 when singer/keyboardist Emily Cook and guitarist David Klotz met while both working for the same film production company. With the addition of drummer Aaron Ryder, the group played its first live dates at area clubs like Spaceland and Cafe Bleu, and in 1998 issued their debut EP Music for Beginners on the Top Quality label, with the cut "Crazy Love" becoming a staple on L.A. radio station KROQ.

Their debut album, The Invisible Girl, peaked at No. 39 on CMJ's Radio 200 Chart in December, 1999. Dave Newton, guitarist for the British band The Mighty Lemon Drops was an active member of Fonda between 1998 and 2003. In 2001, Fonda wrote and performed the theme song to the Miramax/Dimension film, Spy Kids. "Spy Kids (Save The World)" was released as a CD/DVD single in Europe on Gold Circle Records. The song received regular airplay on Radio Disney and the accompanying music video was shown on the Nickelodeon TV Channel. Fonda has since released two full-length albums for the Parasol Records imprint label Hidden Agenda Records. Actor Ted Raimi directed the music video for Fonda's song "Close To Home".

Fonda released their fourth album in January 2013.

== Discography ==
=== Albums ===
- The Invisible Girl (1999, Top Quality Records)
- The Strange and The Familiar (2001, Parasol/Hidden Agenda Records)
- Catching Up To The Future (2003, Parasol/Hidden Agenda Records)
- Sell Your Memories (2013, Minty Fresh)

=== EPs ===
- The Music For Beginners (1998, Top Quality Records)
- Better Days (2011, Fonda Music, Inc.)
- Better Days (Expanded Vinyl Edition - 2011, Minty Fresh)

=== Singles (7" vinyl) ===
- "Summer Land" / "People and Stars" (2000, Planting Seeds Records)
