= Mason Cook =

American actor (born 2000)

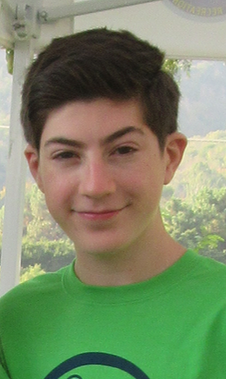
- Mason Cook, at the Shane's Inspiration 5K in Griffith Park, September 2017
- Born: July 25, 2000 (age 26); Oklahoma City, Oklahoma, U.S.
- Occupation: Actor
- Years active: 2007–present
- Known for: Spy Kids: All the Time in the World; Speechless

Mason Cook (born July 25, 2000) is an American actor. He played Cecil Wilson in the 2011 film Spy Kids: All the Time in the World. From 2016 to 2019, he portrayed Ray DiMeo in the ABC sitcom Speechless.

== Early life ==
Cook was born on July 25, 2000 in Oklahoma City, Oklahoma. He attended Nichols Hills Elementary School. He enjoys BMX-biking and skateboarding. He has three siblings: Lilly, Lane and Georgia.

== Career ==
Cook's first professional work was on television, on the sitcom According to Jim and the drama Grey's Anatomy.

When Cook was 11, he portrayed the role of Cecil Wilson in Spy Kids: All the Time in the World. For this, he was nominated for the Young Artist Award for Best Performance in a Feature Film – Supporting Young Actor in 2011. He also performed the minor recurring character Corey on the sitcom The Middle for several years. In 2016, he was cast as Ray DiMeo in the ABC sitcom Speechless.

== Filmography ==
=== Television ===
Year	Title	Role	Notes
2008	According to Jim	Concert Attendee	Episode: "Chaperone"
2009	Grey's Anatomy	Casey	Episode: "New History"
2009–2013	The Middle	Corey	4 episodes
2011	The Indestructible Jimmy Brown	Eddie Baxter	2 episodes
2011	Criminal Minds	Bobby Smith	Episode: "From Childhood's Hour"
2011	Hot in Cleveland	Austin	Episode: "The Emmy Show"
2011	Victorious	Harry	Episode: "The Diddly-Bops"; uncredited
2012	The Cleveland Show	Mexican Boy	Voice, episode: "There Goes El Neighborhood"
2012	Mockingbird Lane	Eddie Munster	Pilot of the unproduced series
2012	Desperate Housewives	Jasper Zeller	Episode: "Witch's Lament"
2014	Legends	Aiden Odum	Recurring role; 7 episodes
2014	New Girl	Tommy	Episode: "Dance"
2014–2016	The Goldbergs	Tyler Stansfield	Recurring role; 4 episodes
2014	R.L. Stine's The Haunting Hour	Bo	Episode: "Grandpa's Glasses"
2015	If There Be Thorns	Bart Sheffield	Television film
2015	Steven Universe	Young Lars Barriga	Voice, episode: "Horror Club"
2015	Grimm	Peter	Episode: "Lost Boys"
2016–2019	Speechless	Ray DiMeo	Main role
2025	Shifting Gears	River	Episode: "License"

=== Film ===
Year	Title	Role	Notes
2010	Raising Hope	8-year-old Jimmy Chance	
2011	Spy Kids: All the Time in the World	Cecil Wilson	
2012	Treasure Buddies	Pete Howard	
2012	Wyatt Earp's Revenge	Young Conrad	
2013	The Incredible Burt Wonderstone	Young Burt	
2013	The Lone Ranger	Will	
2021	Plan B	Kyle	
2023	Silver Haze	Mason	
