= Spy Kids (film) =

2001 film by Robert Rodriguez

- Theatrical release poster
- Directed by: Robert Rodriguez
- Written by: Robert Rodriguez
- Produced by: Elizabeth Avellán; Robert Rodriguez
- Starring: Alexa Vega; Daryl Sabara; Antonio Banderas; Carla Gugino; Alan Cumming; Teri Hatcher; Cheech Marin; Danny Trejo; Robert Patrick; Tony Shalhoub
- Cinematography: Guillermo Navarro
- Edited by: Robert Rodriguez
- Music by: Danny Elfman; Gavin Greenaway; Heitor Pereira; John Debney; Robert Rodriguez; Los Lobos
- Production company: Troublemaker Studios
- Distributed by: Dimension Films
- Release dates: March 18, 2001 (Disney California Adventure); March 30, 2001 (United States)
- Running time: 88 minutes
- Country: United States
- Language: English
- Budget: $35 million
- Box office: $147.9 million

Spy Kids is a 2001 American spy action comedy film written and directed by Robert Rodriguez. The film stars Alexa Vega, Daryl Sabara, Antonio Banderas, Carla Gugino, Alan Cumming, Teri Hatcher, Cheech Marin, Danny Trejo, Robert Patrick and Tony Shalhoub.

Spy Kids premiered at Disney California Adventure in Anaheim, California on March 18, 2001, and was released in the United States on March 30, by Dimension Films. An extended cut, titled Spy Kids: Special Edition, was released in US theaters on August 8, 2001. The film received positive reviews from critics and grossed $147.9 million against a production budget of $35 million. The film was nominated for Best Fantasy Film at the 28th Saturn Awards.

The success of the film led to a Spy Kids franchise, consisting of four sequels and an animated television series.

In the years following its release, the film gained a cult following, and in 2024, it was selected for preservation in the United States National Film Registry by the Library of Congress as being "culturally, historically, or aesthetically significant".

== Plot ==
Gregorio and Ingrid Cortez are spies with two children, Carmen and Juni, whom they shield from their lives to protect them from inherent danger. They work for the Organization of Super Spies (OSS) doing office consultant work, but are suddenly called back to active field work to find missing agents. Gregorio suspects children's television host Fegan Floop has kidnapped them, mutating them into his "Fooglies" – creatures on his show, a program that Juni avidly watches. The children are left in the care of their uncle, Felix Gumm.

Gregorio and Ingrid are captured by Floop's "Thumb-Thumbs" (robots whose arms, legs, and heads resemble oversized thumbs) and taken to his castle. Felix is alerted to the parents' capture, activates the fail-safe, and tells the children the truth about their parents, and that he is not their uncle, but an agent sent to watch over them. The house is attacked by Ninja Thumb-Thumbs, and Felix is captured while the children escape alone via a miniature submarine set to autopilot to a safe house.

Inside Floop's castle, he introduces his latest creation, small child-shaped robots, to Mr. Lisp. They plan to replace the world leaders' children with these super-strong robots to control the world, but since the androids have no artificial intelligence yet, they are unable to function outside their regular programming. Lisp is furious, demanding usable androids. Floop, with his second-in-command Alexander Minion, interrogates Gregorio and Ingrid about 'The Third Brain'. Ingrid knows nothing of it, while Gregorio claims he had destroyed the brain years ago. After Floop leaves, Gregorio reveals to Ingrid that the Third Brain was a secret OSS project he had worked on: an AI brain with all the skills of the entire OSS. The project was scrapped for being too dangerous, and many scientists demolished the brains that they were working on, but Gregorio refused to destroy the final prototype.

At the safe house, the children accept that their parents were spies and decide to rescue them. Carmen and Juni are visited by OSS agent Ms. Gradenko. Giving Carmen a bracelet as a sign of trust, she asks about the Third Brain, but Carmen is confused. Juni accidentally exposes the Third Brain. Gradenko orders the house to be dismantled, and the siblings realize Gradenko is a traitor when Juni sees ninja Thumb-Thumbs destroying the escape submarine. With Gradenko's intentions revealed, a chase ensues. Carmen gets the brain, and she and Juni escape. She realizes too late that the bracelet from Gradenko has a tracking device, and she and Juni are tracked down and attacked by their robot counterparts, who steal the Third Brain and fly away.

Meanwhile, back at the castle, Gregorio tells Ingrid that Minion used to work for the OSS, but was fired after he reported him tampering with the Third Brain project. With it, Floop can achieve his goal, but he wishes to continue his children's TV show. Minion has different plans and takes over, locking Floop inside his "virtual room", the chamber where he films his television series. Carmen and Juni receive reluctant help from Gregorio's estranged brother Isador "Machete" Cortez when they show up at his spy shop. He refuses to accompany them, so they steal some gear and take his spy jet to fly to Floop's castle. After a few mishaps, Carmen and Juni eject themselves from the plane before it crashes into the castle, and they enter via the underwater entrance.

While the children infiltrate the castle, Juni rescues Floop, who helps him and Carmen release their parents. Together, they trap Minion in Floop's Fooglies machine, mutating him into a Fooglie. Confronting Lisp and Gradenko, the family is beset by all 500 robot children. Suddenly, Machete busts through the window, reconciling with Gregorio and joining the family to fight. However, at the last moment, Floop reprograms the robots to change sides. The 500 superhuman robots quickly overpower Minion, Lisp, and Gradenko. With advice from Juni, Floop introduces the robot versions of Carmen and Juni on his show. At home, some time later, the family's breakfast is interrupted by Devlin, the head of the OSS, with a mission for Carmen and Juni. The children tell him they will only accept if all the Cortezes can work on the mission together as a family.

== Cast ==
- Alexa Vega as Carmen Cortez, the daughter of Gregorio and Ingrid Cortez.
  - Vega also portrays Carmen's robotic counterpart Carmenita.
  - Addisyn Fair as Infant Carmen Cortez
- Daryl Sabara as Juni Cortez, Carmen's younger brother and the son of Gregorio and Ingrid Cortez.
  - Sabara also portrays Juni's robotic counterpart Junito.
- Danny Trejo as Isador "Machete" Cortez, (Note: Robert Rodriguez stated on a Reddit AmA that the Spy Kids movies and the Machete movies are alternate universes.) a gadget inventor, Juni and Carmen's uncle, and Gregorio's estranged brother.
- Antonio Banderas as Gregorio Cortez, retired OSS agent turned consultant worker and father to Juni and Carmen.
- Carla Gugino as Ingrid Cortez, retired OSS agent turned consultant worker and Gregorio's wife, mother to Juni and Carmen.
- Alan Cumming as Fegan Floop, the host of Floop's Fooglies.
- Teri Hatcher as Ms. Gradenko, a former OSS agent turned associate of Mr. Lisp and Minion.
- Cheech Marin as Felix Gumm, an OSS agent who poses as Carmen and Juni's uncle.
- Robert Patrick as Mr. Lisp, a businessman.
- Tony Shalhoub as Alexander Minion, Floop's assistant.

Additionally, Mike Judge portrays Donnagon Giggles, George Clooney portrays Devlin, Kara Slack portrays Carmen's friend Leticia (Note: A prop tag for screen-worn shoes states that the name of Carmen's friend is Leticia.), Eve Sabara (Note: Originally credited as Evan Sabara; Eve came out as a trans woman in 2020.) portrays 'Intruder' Spy Kid, Angela Lanza portrays Newscaster, Richard Linklater portrays Cool Spy, Johnny Reno portrays Agent Johnny, Guillermo Navarro portrays Pastor, and Charles Crocker portrays Thumb People.

== Production ==
"I didn't want any guns or violence. I wanted it to be action/adventure for kids. A guy told me his son loved Desperado. I said, How old is your son? He said, six. Fuck, he shouldn't be watching that! I can't make movies like that anymore. You don't feel like it's your responsibility, because I never had the intention for kids to watch that. But the reality is they do. Even in The Faculty, I didn't want to gore it up. I had everybody alive at the end."

— Robert Rodriguez on one of his motivations for producing a family film

Robert Rodriguez's first family-oriented production was the short film Bedhead (1991); since the release of El Mariachi (1992) a year later, he desired to make the same type of feature-length family features he grew up with. He wanted a movie that felt like it was written, directed, and produced by a kid. Most of the final screenplay was written in 1998.

Tony Shalhoub joined the project as a Robert Rodriguez fan and a father of two children wanting to act in a kid-aimed film. After reading the script, he met Rodriguez and his wife Elizabeth Avellán, and was shown concept drawings of designs and animations for the actor to get an idea of the style of the film. When acting, Shalhoub's experience of reading books and playing with his kids enabled him to view Rodriguez's child-like scenarios from the perspective of his children. Carla got her role over Kelly Preston and Julianne Moore. Elizabeth Olsen auditioned for a role, as did Brie Larson. Alexa Vega and Daryl Sabara auditioned their roles of Carmen and Juni in 1999.

The distorted heads growing out of Alexander Minion when mutated by the machines were gel molded by Rodriguez and, according to Shalhoub, very lightweight.

Most of Spy Kids' 48 days of filming was in Austin, Texas in 2000, although some exterior shots were done in the countries of South America.

== Music ==
The film score is written by John Debney and Danny Elfman, with contributions from a variety of others, including director Robert Rodriguez and Marcel Rodriguez. Among Elfman's contributions is "Floop's Song (Cruel World)", which is performed by Cumming. Los Lobos covers the Tito Puente song, "Oye Como Va" (adapted as "Oye Como Spy" by David Garza and Robert Rodriguez). The song was nominated for "Outstanding Song in a Motion Picture Soundtrack" at the 2002 ALMA Awards. The closing theme, "Spy Kids (Save the World)", is performed by the Los Angeles-based indie pop band, Fonda.

The score won an award at the ASCAP Film and Television Music Awards.

1. "Cortez Family" (Gavin Greenaway, Heitor Teixeira Pereira, Harry Gregson-Williams) – 1:39
2. "My Parents Are Spies" (Danny Elfman) – 2:09
3. "Spy Wedding" (Los Lobos, Robert Rodriguez) – 2:11
4. "Spy Kids Demonstration" (John Debney, R. Rodriguez, Marcel Rodriguez) – 1:06
5. "Parents on Mission" (Debney, Elfman, Greenaway, Pereira) – 1:17
6. "Kids Escape House" (Greenaway, Pereira) – 3:14
7. "Pod Chase" (Debney, Elfman, Gregson-Williams) – 1:38
8. "The Safehouse" (Debney, Elfman) – 0:47
9. "The Third Brain" (Debney, R. Rodriguez, M. Rodriguez) – 1:00
10. "Buddy Pack Escape" (Elfman) – 1:39
11. "Oye Como Spy" (Davíd Garza, Tito Puente, R. Rodriguez) Performed by Los Lobos – 2:59
12. "Floop's Song (Cruel World)" (Elfman) Performed by Alan Cumming – 0:59
13. "Spy Go Round" (Greenaway, Pereira, M. Rodriguez) – 2:11
14. "Minion" (Chris Boardman, Greenaway, Pereira, R. Rodriguez) – 1:03
15. "Sneaking Around Machetes" (Elfman) – 0:35
16. "The Spy Plane" (Debney, Elfman) – 1:29
17. "Floop's Castle" (Boardman) – 1:29
18. "Final Family Theme" (Gregson-Williams) – 1:44
19. "Spy Kids (Save the World)" (Emily Cook, David Klotz, Dave Newton) Performed by Fonda – 2:20

== Release ==
=== Marketing ===
In March 2001, Spy Kids screened for exhibitors at the ShoWest in Las Vegas.

Spy Kids was the first film to be promoted as a part of a two-year deal between Miramax Films and Pop Secret signed in June 2001. Formalized thanks to the successes of Spy Kids and Bridget Jones's Diary (2001), the deal stated annually, and for five films, Pop Secret popcorn would be present at theater screenings and as tie-ins for video releases. For Spy Kids, Pop Secret popcorn was in theaters for the August re-release, while on home video Pop Secret Special Editions were issued that came with collectibles and tickets to win prizes. Target also offered purchasers of Spy Kids copies free Pop Secret popcorn.

Former promotion executive vice president at Miramax Films, Lori Sale, admitted the McDonald's tie-ins for the first three Spy Kids were the three best of the company.

=== Extended version ===
A special edition with a deleted scene was released in theaters on August 8, 2001. It was also supposedly released in specially marked Kellogg's boxes for a limited time in Canada, alongside three other movies. There were plans to release the special edition to DVD but it never materialized, despite the fact that a director's commentary and interviews were already recorded for it. However, that version is available on the film's Blu-ray re-release, which was released on August 2, 2011, for both the series' tenth anniversary and to coincide with the fourth film. The commentary and the rest of the deleted scenes, however, were not included.

== Reception ==
=== Box office ===
Spy Kids opened theatrically in 3,104 venues on March 30, 2001, earning $26.5 million in its first weekend and ranking first in the North American box office. It held the number one spot for three weeks before being toppled by the second weekend earnings of Bridget Jones's Diary, which was also released by Miramax Films. The film ultimately grossed $112.7 million in the United States and Canada, and $35.2 million internationally for a worldwide total of $147.9 million.

=== Critical response ===
On Rotten Tomatoes, Spy Kids holds an approval rating of 92% based on 132 reviews and an average rating of 7.3/10. The site's critical consensus reads: "A kinetic and fun movie that's sure to thrill children of all ages." On Metacritic it has a weighted average score of 71 out of 100 based on 27 critics, indicating "generally favorable reviews". Audiences polled by CinemaScore gave the film an average grade of "A" on an A+ to F scale.

Roger Ebert of the Chicago Sun-Times gave it 3.5 out of 4 stars and called it "a treasure". He wrote: "Movies like Spy Kids are so rare. Families are often reduced to attending scatological dumber-and-dumbest movies like See Spot Run--movies that teach vulgarity as a value. Spy Kids is an intelligent, upbeat, happy movie that is not about the comedy of embarrassment, that does not have anybody rolling around in dog poop, that would rather find out what it can accomplish than what it can get away with". Mick LaSalle of the San Francisco Chronicle wrote: "It's entertaining and inoffensive, a rare combination in kids' films, which are usually neither". Lael Loewenstein of Variety observed: "A full-blown fantasy-action adventure that also strenuously underscores the importance of family, Spy Kids is determined to take no prisoners in the under-12 demographic, a goal it sometimes dazzlingly achieves. Robert Rodriguez's film, in which two kids become real spies to save the world from a mad genius, fulfills kids' empowerment fantasies and features enough techno-wizardry and cool f/x to satisfy those weaned on videogames".

=== Accolades ===
Award	Category	Recipient	Result
ALMA Award	Outstanding Director in a Motion Picture	Robert Rodriguez	Won
ALMA Award	Outstanding Actor in a Motion Picture	Antonio Banderas	Nominated
ALMA Award	Outstanding Motion Picture	Spy Kids	Nominated
ALMA Award	Outstanding Screenplay (Original or Adapted)	Robert Rodriguez	Nominated
ALMA Award	Outstanding Song in a Motion Picture Soundtrack	Los Lobos For the song "Oye Como Spy"	Nominated
ASCAP Film and Television Music Awards	Top Box Office Films	John Debney	Won
Saturn Award	Best Fantasy Film	Spy Kids	Nominated
Broadcast Film Critics Association Awards	Best Family Film - Live Action	Spy Kids	Nominated
Kid's Choice Awards, USA	Favorite Male Action Hero	Antonio Banderas	Nominated
Phoenix Film Critics Society Awards	Best Family Film	Spy Kids	Nominated
Young Artist Awards	Best Family Feature Film - Comedy	Spy Kids	Nominated
Young Artist Awards	Best Performance in a Feature Film - Supporting Young Actress	Alexa Vega	Nominated

== Legacy ==
Retrospective pieces consider Spy Kids significant in 2001 for starring a Latino secret-agent family. Shalhoub added other reasons it was a unique family film: "I don't think there was anything ever like this before. So it had that whole component going for it, too. It was comedic. It was a little creepy in places. I think it had a bit of a darker side. It just checked a lot of boxes".

Vulture writer Iana Murray positively described Spy Kids, with oddities like the Thumb-Thumbs, as an example of an era where films "could just be weird without having to explain themselves". She called Shalhoub's performance of Alexander the best in the film, reasoning he plays "everything so hilariously straight-faced that it only enhances the chaos around him".

== Other media ==
=== Novelization ===
Talk Miramax Books released a novelization of the movie in March 2001. The novel was written by children's book author Megan Stine.
