= Machete (2010 film) =

2010 exploitation action film

- Theatrical release poster
- Directed by: Robert Rodriguez; Ethan Maniquis
- Written by: Robert Rodriguez; Álvaro Rodriguez
- Produced by: Robert Rodriguez; Elizabeth Avellán; Rick Schwartz
- Starring: Danny Trejo; Steven Seagal; Michelle Rodriguez; Jeff Fahey; Cheech Marin; Lindsay Lohan; Don Johnson; Jessica Alba; Robert De Niro
- Cinematography: Jimmy Lindsey
- Edited by: Robert Rodriguez; Rebecca Rodriguez
- Music by: Chingon
- Production companies: Overnight Films; Troublemaker Studios
- Distributed by: 20th Century Fox
- Release dates: September 1, 2010 (Venice Film Festival); September 3, 2010 (United States)
- Running time: 105 minutes
- Country: United States
- Languages: English; Spanish
- Budget: $10.5 million
- Box office: $45.5 million

Machete (also known as Robert Rodriguez's Machete) is a 2010 American exploitation black comedy action splatter film directed by Robert Rodriguez and Ethan Maniquis. The film is an expansion of a fake trailer published as a part of the promotion of Rodriguez's and Quentin Tarantino's 2007 Grindhouse double-feature; Machete continues the B movie and exploitation style of Grindhouse. The story sees the eponymous character who, after being hired to assassinate a corrupt senator only to be double-crossed, goes on a vengeful quest against the conspirators.

The film stars Danny Trejo as Machete, reprising the role from the fake trailer. Trejo also previously portrayed an alternate version of the character in the Spy Kids films. The film additionally co-stars Steven Seagal, Michelle Rodriguez, Jessica Alba, Lindsay Lohan, Cheech Marin, Don Johnson and Robert De Niro.

It is Trejo's first lead role as the titular character, and Seagal's first theatrically released film since 2002's Half Past Dead (and his last theatrically released film to date). Machete was released in the United States by 20th Century Fox on September 3, 2010. A sequel, Machete Kills, solely directed by Rodriguez, was released on October 11, 2013.

== Plot ==
In Mexico, Machete Cortez, a Mexican Federal and his younger partner are on a mission to rescue a kidnapped girl. During the operation, his partner is killed, the kidnapped girl stabs him in the leg before she is killed, and Machete is betrayed by his corrupt Chief to the powerful drug lord and former Federal, Rogelio Torrez, who kills the girl, brings in Machete's wife to kill her in front of him, and implies that he will kill Machete's daughter before leaving him for dead.

Three years later, a down-and-out Machete roams Texas, scraping by on yard work. Michael Booth, a local businessman and spin doctor, explains to Machete that corrupt Texas State Senator John McLaughlin is deporting hundreds of illegal immigrants, which would reduce the number of laborers. To stop this, Booth offers Machete $150,000 to kill McLaughlin. Machete accepts the murder contract after Booth threatens to kill him if he does not.

Machete trains a rifle on McLaughlin from a rooftop during a rally, but before he fires, he sees one of Booth's henchmen aiming at him. The henchman shoots Machete in the shoulder, and shoots McLaughlin in the leg. It is revealed that Booth orchestrated the attempted assassination as part of a false flag operation to gain public support for McLaughlin's secure border campaign. By setting up Machete as the gunman, the conspirators appear that an outlaw Mexican immigrant has tried to assassinate the senator, who is known for his tough stance on illegal immigration.

An injured Machete escapes capture by Booth and is taken to a hospital to be treated for wounds, escaping again from Booth's henchmen at the hospital. Agent Sartana Rivera, a persistent U.S. Immigration and Customs Enforcement agent, is sent by her superior to capture the injured Machete. Machete, with the help of Luz, aka Shé, the leader of an illegal immigrant aid movement known as the Network, recruits Padre, his "holy" brother. For revenge on Booth, Machete kidnaps Booth's wife June and his daughter April, after "starring" in an amateur adult film with them. He also collects evidence from Booth's house linking McLaughlin and Torrez in a major drug trafficking deal.

After encountering Machete, Sartana begins to develop an interest in him. Elsewhere, Booth, who is revealed to be working for Torrez, hires a hitman, Osiris Amanpour, to assist in the hunt for Machete. A group of border vigilantes sponsored by McLaughlin and led by Von Jackson begin attacking anyone who may be harboring Machete, and they shoot Luz in the right eye.

Booth and Osiris lead a raid on the church. Padre kills their henchmen before the two incapacitate him and kill him by nailing him to a cross, but do not find Booth's wife and daughter. Unbeknownst to Booth, the church has cameras. Through the CCTV recordings, the news of McLaughlin's corruption and faked assassination is eventually aired on national television. Infuriated, McLaughlin kills Booth and heads back to join Torrez and Jackson to kill Machete. In order to eliminate the people who double-crossed him, Machete gathers the Mexican Network and leads them to the base of the border vigilantes. When McLaughlin arrives at the base, Jackson turns on him for being involved with the Mexican drug trade and attempts to execute him, but is interrupted when Machete and the illegals arrive.

During this confrontation, the Mexican illegals triumph over the border vigilantes. Jackson tries to escape, but Luz, who survived and now sports an eye patch, shoots him in the back of the head. Machete fights Torrez and stabs him, who then scornfully kills himself through Seppuku. April shows up wearing a nun's habit after escaping from the church and shoots McLaughlin after figuring out that he has killed her father.

Injured, McLaughlin manages to escape, but he is killed by the last remnants of his own border vigilante group, who mistake him for a Mexican. Machete meets with Sartana, who gives him a green card, but he rejects it, saying that he is already a legend. They kiss and ride off into the night.

== Cast ==
- Danny Trejo as Isador "Machete" Cortez, "a legendary ex-Federale with a deadly attitude and the skills to match"
- Steven Seagal as Rogelio Torrez, a drug lord, as well as Machete's former partner with the Federales
- Michelle Rodriguez as Luz / Shé, "a taco-truck lady with a revolutionary heart"
- Jeff Fahey as Michael Booth, "a ruthless businessman with an endless payroll of killers"
- Cheech Marin as Padre Benicio Del Toro, Machete's brother, "a priest who's good with blessings, but better with guns"
- Lindsay Lohan as April Booth, "a socialite with a penchant for guns" and "a nun with a gun"
- Don Johnson as Von Jackson, "a twisted border vigilante leading a small army." The character was originally known as "Lt. Stillman" and was meant to be Sartana's superior
- Jessica Alba as Sartana Rivera, "a beautiful immigrations officer torn between enforcing the law and doing what is popular in the eyes of her familia". Alba also portrays Sartana's twin sister, Marissa in deleted scenes
- Robert De Niro as Senator John McLaughlin, a politician campaigning to incite hatred against illegal immigrants
- Shea Whigham as Sniper, Booth's right-hand man and bodyguard
- Daryl Sabara as Julio Junito
- Gilbert Trejo as Jorge
- Ara Celi as Reporter
- Tom Savini as Osiris Amanpour, a hitman hired by Booth to kill Machete
- Billy Blair as Billy, Von Jackson's henchman
- Felix Sabates as Doctor Felix
- Electra and Elise Avellan as Nurses Mona and Lisa
- Mayra J. Leal as Naked Girl
- Juan Gabriel Pareja as Rico
- Alicia Marek as June Booth, the socialite wife of Michael Booth and April's mother
- Tito Larriva as Culebra Cruzado
- Cheryl "Chin" Cunningham as Torrez's henchwoman
- Nimród Antal as Booth's bodyguard #1

James Parks reprises his role as Edgar McGraw from the From Dusk till Dawn franchise, Kill Bill: Volume 1 and 2, and Grindhouse segment Death Proof in an uncredited cameo appearance.

== Production ==
=== Development ===
According to Robert Rodriguez, the origins of the film go back to Desperado (1995). He says, "When I met Danny, I said, 'This guy should be like the Mexican Jean-Claude Van Damme or Charles Bronson, putting out a movie every year and his name should be Machete.' So I decided to do that way back when, never got around to it until finally now. So now, of course, I want to keep going and do a feature." Rodriguez stated, "There weren't any action movies that with a Latin flavor that could play to a broad audience. When I watched [director] John Woo's movies, they made me want to be Asian. Woo and [actor] Chow Yun-Fat's Hard Boiled and The Killer really inspired me to make films that would create that feeling in the Latin arena."

In an interview with Rolling Stone magazine, Rodriguez said that he wrote the screenplay in 1993 when he cast Trejo in Desperado. "So I wrote him this idea of a federale from Mexico who gets hired to do hatchet jobs in the U.S. I had heard sometimes FBI or DEA have a really tough job that they don't want to get their own agents killed on, they'll hire an agent from Mexico to come do the job for $25,000. I thought, 'That's Machete. He would come and do a really dangerous job for a lot of money to him but for everyone else over here it's peanuts'. But I never got around to making it."

Instead, during the filming of Rodriguez and Quentin Tarantino's Grindhouse (2007), Rodriguez shot lobby cards and sequences from parts of the original script in 2006 for a fake trailer featuring Trejo, Cheech Marin and Jeff Fahey. At South by Southwest in March 2007, Rodriguez announced that he would be expanding his trailer for Machete into a feature-length film. He announced that it would be a bonus feature on the Planet Terror DVD, but the film became a theatrical release.

During the 2008 San Diego Comic-Con, he took the time to speak about Machete, including such topics as the film's status, possible sequels, and production priorities. It was also revealed that he has regularly pulled sequences from it for his other productions including Once Upon a Time in Mexico (2003).

=== Direction ===
Rodriguez had always planned to be the head-director of the film because he usually used his "one-man crew" technique. In April 2009, it was announced that Ethan Maniquis, who is a long-time editor of Rodriguez's films, would be co-directing the film with Rodriguez.

At the 2010 San Diego Comic-Con, Trejo commented on Rodriguez: "He's a genius. He's an absolute genius. He makes movie-making fun. You know, he makes you wanna go to work. A lot of people wake up saying 'I woke up before my alarm went off' just 'cause you're excited to work with him. You wonder 'what is he going to come up with today?', because every day, he's like inventing something new. So it's awesome to work with somebody like that". "Robert has an incredible vision and is very precise, and [working on his films] you feel like you're in the middle of something both big and experiential. And that anything is possible," states Jeff Fahey, who has collaborated with Rodriguez on Machete and Grindhouse.

=== Casting ===
The film's lead role had always been intended for Trejo, as Rodriguez mentioned. "Nobody really knew about Desperado, yet the local townspeople would flock to see Danny, thinking he was the star of the movie, even though his part was very small," Rodriguez remembers. "He has incredible presence, and I knew I had found Machete. So, I handed him a knife, and told him to start practicing."

Trejo, Marin and Fahey were announced to be reprising their characters in the trailer for the film. Tito Larriva did not reprise his primary role as the sniper who shoots Machete and was replaced by Shea Whigham. Michelle Rodriguez was the first actress to be cast in the film who was not in the original trailer.

Chris Cooper was approached for the role of Senator McLaughlin. After Cooper turned down the role, Robert De Niro was cast. "From the moment you get Robert De Niro in your movie, all the other actors come running," says Rodriguez on De Niro's involvement in the film. "What I liked about the character was that it was a fun thing to do in a sense of irony and it's not taken seriously. He's not taken seriously on one level so that frees you to have fun without being weighted down by some requirements," says De Niro on playing his character.

Lindsay Lohan was revealed to be cast in the film in July 2009. "Lindsay's cool," Rodriguez said of Lohan. "There's actually a cool part in the movie for her if she takes it. Lohan portrays April Booth, the socialite daughter of Booth, the man who double-crosses Machete. "April was born into a life of privilege and takes everything she has for granted," says Lohan. "But she undergoes a big change. As an actress, I like pushing the envelope." Lohan recolored her hair from auburn red to platinum blonde.

Jonah Hill was originally cast as Julio but was replaced by Daryl Sabara, who had worked with Rodriguez, Marin and Trejo on the set of the Spy Kids franchise. Jessica Alba said of her role of Agent Sartana, "My character is an Immigrations Officer and she hunts him (Machete) down, but finds out that he was double-crossed himself. She wrestles with her own right-wing kind of mentality because she's all about enforcing the law and doing what the system tells you."

"The cast may have sounded bizarre to some people when first announced. But when you watch Machete, you see that the actors fit their roles very well. The eclectic mix really works. Danny's worked in hundreds of movies and probably worked with everyone in Machete at some point. Everyone just loves Danny and appreciated the fact he was finally getting to be the star of his own film. I remember Robert De Niro, who worked with Danny in Heat telling him that, [Machete] is going to be really good for you.'"

Regarding the nudity that was present in the film, Rodriguez mentioned that he deliberately set the first scene with a nude woman to make the audience think that subsequent scenes show more than they actually do. Alba mentioned that for her shower scene, "I had undies on, and I had other stuff on, and they just sort of etched it out in post [production]. That's not really me. I'm better covered up."

=== Filming ===
Filming for the fake trailer for Grindhouse began in summer 2006 while Rodriguez was also filming Planet Terror. The scenes that Rodriguez shot consisted of scenes involving Trejo, Marin, Fahey and Tito Larriva. Some of the scenes filmed for the trailer remain in the film, while others were re-shot.

Principal photography began on July 29, 2009, in and around the city of Austin, Texas. Lindsay Lohan filmed her role in three days, two in August and one in September. Principal photography of the film ended on September 24, 2009.

== Release ==
=== Marketing ===
The original fake trailer was released and attached to Grindhouse in 2007. On July 28, 2010, it was confirmed that Machete would headline the Venice Film Festival held on September 1, 2010, at a special midnight screening, followed by the general theatrical release on September 3.

Hyde Park Entertainment boarded the film as its international sales agent in September 2009, selling the bulk of international rights to Sony Pictures Worldwide Acquisitions at the Toronto International Film Festival.

The film was released in the U.S. on September 3, 2010, by 20th Century Fox. The film appeared on 3,400 screens at 2,670 locations.

A fake trailer for the film was released on May 5, 2010, through Ain't It Cool News. The trailer opened with Danny Trejo saying, "This is Machete with a special Cinco de Mayo message to Arizona", followed by scenes of gunfire, bloodshed, and highlights of the cast. The fake trailer combined elements of the Machete trailer that appeared in Grindhouse with footage from the actual film, and implied that the film would be about Machete leading a revolt against anti-immigration politicians and border vigilantes.

Several film websites, including Internet Movie Database, reported that it was the official teaser for the film. However, Rodriguez later revealed the trailer to be a joke, explaining "it was Cinco de Mayo and I had too much tequila". The official theatrical trailer was released on July 8, 2010. It was then attached with Predators, which Rodriguez produced, and later shown before The Expendables. A red band trailer featuring more gruesome scenes from the film was released on July 23, 2010.

The film is banned in Ukraine due to one of its co-stars, Seagal, visiting Crimea during the Russian occupation without permission from the Ukrainian authorities, causing him to be blacklisted.

=== Box office performance ===
Film	Release date	Box office revenue			Box office ranking		Budget	Reference
Film	United States	United States	International	Worldwide	All-time United States	All-time worldwide	Budget	Reference
Machete	September 2010	$26,593,646	$17,499,670	$44,093,316	#2,179	Unknown	$10,500,000	

Machete opened in 2,670 theaters in the United States on September 3 and earned $14,102,888 for its four-day weekend, placing second at the box office behind The American. The film opened at #2 behind The American and took in $3,866,357—$1,448 per theater—on its opening day and $14,102,888—$4,001 per theater—on its opening weekend. Machete placed fourth at the box office by the end of the week after Resident Evil: Afterlife opened in theaters, totaling $20,916,709.

Machete has made $26,593,646 in the United States as of November 18, 2010. The film made another $17,499,670 in foreign markets, bringing the gross total to $44,093,316, as of November 18, 2010.

== Critical reception ==
On review aggregation website Rotten Tomatoes Machete holds an approval rating of 70% based on 195 reviews, with an average rating of 6.33/10. The site's critical consensus reads, "Machete is messy, violent, shallow, and tasteless -- and that's precisely the point of one of the summer's most cartoonishly enjoyable films". Another aggregator, Metacritic, gives the film a weighted average score of 60 out of 100, based on 29 critics, indicating "mixed or average reviews". Audiences polled by CinemaScore gave the film an average grade of "B" on an A+ to F scale.

Jessica Alba won a Razzie Award for Worst Supporting Actress, along with her other roles in The Killer Inside Me, Little Fockers and Valentine's Day.

=== Home media ===
Rodriguez expressed in an interview that an even more violent director's cut will be released on home media. The R-rated theatrical version of Machete was released on DVD and Blu-ray on January 4, 2011.

On the week ending January 9, 2011, Machete debuted atop the DVD sales chart in America. The DVD sold 691,317 copies in its first week of release.

In the Blu-ray deleted scenes, Rose McGowan is featured as one of Osiris's henchmen named Boots McCoy; one scene shows her confronting Luz and shooting her through a cat she is holding, hitting her in the eye and seemingly killing her. However, in the film, this action was given to Von Jackson, and it is later revealed Luz is merely blinded. In other deleted scenes, Alba also plays the role of Sis, Sartana's twin sister. McCoy later shows up and slits her throat with a razor blade, thinking she is actually Sartana.

== Sequels ==
Before the credits roll, a screen super reads that Machete will return in Machete Kills and Machete Kills Again.

According to Trejo, Rodriguez had scripts for the first of two Machete sequels. At the 2011 San Diego Comic-Con, Rodriguez said that both sequels have been greenlit. The trailer for the third film, Machete Kills Again, precedes the second film as a "Coming Attraction". Machete Kills was released on October 11, 2013.
