= Robert Rodriguez filmography =

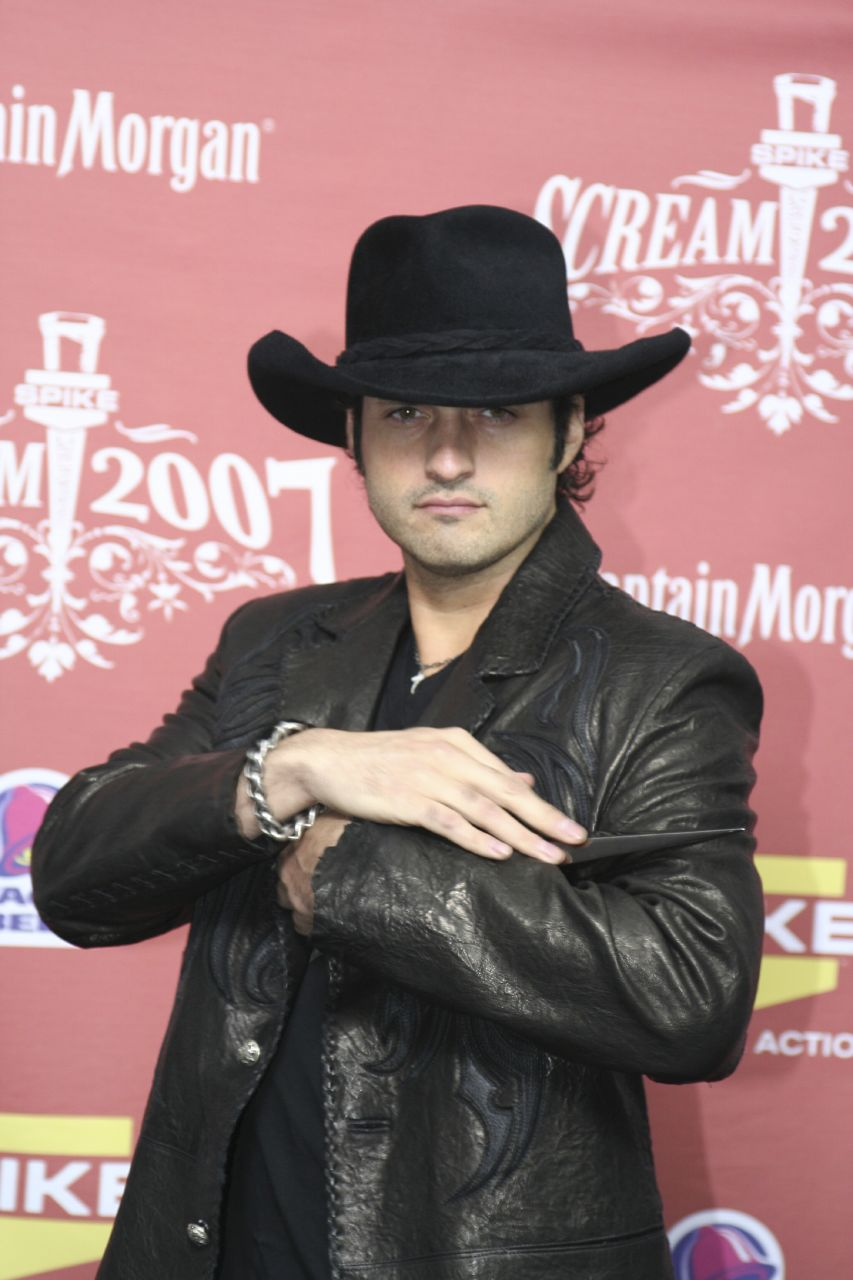
Rodriguez in 2007

Robert Anthony Rodriguez is an American film and television director, producer, writer, composer, cinematographer and editor. He has contributed to many projects as a combination of the six. Less commonly, Rodriguez has also worked as a second unit director, digital animator and a visual effects supervisor.

Despite being rejected from the University of Texas' film school due to poor academic promise of the Arts, Robert Rodriguez created his first 16mm short film Bedhead which opened many doors for him. Rodriguez then created his first feature-length film El Mariachi which was picked up by Columbia Pictures. After directing the television film Roadracers, Rodriguez continued work in Hollywood.

El Mariachi was the first of Rodriguez's Mexico Trilogy that included Desperado and Once Upon a Time in Mexico. Rodriguez continued working on several other film series including the crime-horror film hybrid From Dusk till Dawn and the family-oriented adventure film series Spy Kids. Rodriguez has also collaborated with film director Quentin Tarantino on various projects including Four Rooms, From Dusk till Dawn, Kill Bill: Volume 2, Sin City and Grindhouse.

== Filmography ==
=== Films ===
Year	Title		Credited as								Note
Year	Title		Director	Writer	Producer	DOP	Editor	composer	camera operator	Effects	Note
1993	El Mariachi		Yes	Yes	Yes	Yes	Yes	Yes	Yes	Yes	Also still photographer. Inducted into the National Film Registry in 2011
1995	Desperado		Yes	Yes	Yes	No	Yes	No	Yes	No	
1996	From Dusk till Dawn		Yes	No	Executive	No	Yes	No	No	No	Also re-recording mixer, and soundtrack producer
1998	The Faculty		Yes	No	No	No	Yes	No	Yes	Yes	Also re-recording mixer
1999	From Dusk Till Dawn 3: The Hangman's Daughter		No	Story	Executive	No	No	No	No	No	Direct to video Presenter and special thanks (as Robert R., Mi Hermano)
2001	Spy Kids		Yes	Yes	Yes	No	Yes	Yes	Yes	Yes	Also re-recording mixer Writer: "Oye Como Spy", "Los Robotos". Inducted into the National Film Registry in 2024
2002	Spy Kids 2: The Island of Lost Dreams		Yes	Yes	Yes	Yes	Yes	Yes	Yes	Yes	
2003	Spy Kids 3-D: Game Over		Yes	Yes	Yes	Yes	Yes	Yes	Yes	Yes	
2003	Once Upon a Time in Mexico		Yes	Yes	Yes	Yes	Yes	Yes	Yes	Yes	
2005	Sin City		Yes	Uncredited	Yes	Yes	Yes	Yes	Yes	Yes	
2005	The Adventures of Sharkboy and Lavagirl		Yes	Yes	Uncredited	Yes	Yes	Yes	No	Yes	
2005	Curandero		No	Yes	Executive	No	No	No	No	No	
2007	Grindhouse	Planet Terror	Yes	Yes	Yes	Yes	Yes	Yes	Yes	Yes	
2007	Grindhouse	Death Proof	No	No	Yes	No	No	No	No	No	
2009	Shorts		Yes	Yes	Yes	Yes	Yes	Yes	Yes	No	
2010	Predators		No	No	Yes	No	No	No	No	No	
2010	Machete		Yes	Yes	Yes	No	Yes	Yes	No	Yes	
2011	Spy Kids: All the Time in the World		Yes	Yes	Yes	Yes	No	Yes	No	No	
2013	Machete Kills		Yes	Story	Yes	Yes	Yes	Yes	No	Yes	
2014	Sin City: A Dame to Kill For		Yes	No	Yes	Yes	Yes	Yes	No	Yes	
2019	Alita: Battle Angel		Yes	No	No	No	No	No	No	No	
2019	Red 11		Yes	Yes	Yes	Yes	Yes	No	No	No	
2019	UglyDolls		No	Story	Yes	No	No	No	No	No	
2020	We Can Be Heroes		Yes	Yes	Yes	Yes	Yes	No	No	No	
2021	Happier Than Ever: A Love Letter to Los Angeles		Yes	No	No	No	No	No	No	No	
2023	Hypnotic		Yes	Yes	Yes	Yes	Yes	No	No	No	
2023	Spy Kids: Armageddon		Yes	Yes	Yes	Yes	Yes	Yes	No	No	

=== Short films ===
Year	Title	Credited as				Notes
Year	Title	Director	Writer	Producer	Other	Notes
1991	Bedhead	Yes	Yes	Yes	Yes	Co-written with Bryant Delafosse and David Rodriguez; Also editor, director of photography, composer, animator, and sound effects
1995	Room 309 - "The Misbehavers"	Yes	Yes	No	Yes	Segment from the film Four Rooms; Also editor
2007	Machete	Yes	Yes	Yes	Yes	Fake trailer shown in the double-feature film Grindhouse; Also editor, director of photography, and composer
2011	The Black Mamba	Yes	Yes	Yes	Yes	Commercial short Also editor, director of photography, composer, and sound mixer
2013	Two Scoops	Yes	Yes	Yes	Yes	Co-written with Gary Lathwell and Richard Peretti; Also editor, director of photography, and composer
2015	Sock 'em Dead	Yes	Yes	Yes	Yes	Also editor, uncredited director of photography, and sound
2018	The Limit	Yes	Yes	No	Yes	Short VR film co-written with Racer Max Rodriguez; Also editor and director of photography
2115	100 Years	Yes	No	No	Yes	Set to be released in November 18, 2115; Also editor

=== Acting roles ===
Year	Title	Role	Note
1996	From Dusk till Dawn	Band Member	Uncredited
1997	Full Tilt Boogie	Himself	Documentary
2000	Famous	Punk #2	
2000	Bullfighter	Bullboy #1	
2005	Sin City	SWAT Member	Uncredited
2005	The Adventures of Sharkboy and Lavagirl in 3-D	Shark	Voice, uncredited
2006	High Hopes	Mr. Lewis	
2007	Planet Terror	One of Abby's Henchmen	Uncredited
2008	Dead On: The Life and Cinema of George A. Romero	Himself	Documentary
2008	Fantastic Flesh: The Art of Make-Up EFX	Himself	Documentary
2010	The United Monster Talent Agency	Jaws Scientist	Short film
2013	Amelia's 25th	Emilio Cruz	
2014	New World Man	Mr. Folsom	Voice
2014	Sin City: A Dame to Kill For	Sam's Friend	Uncredited

=== Other roles ===
Year	Title	Notes
1994	Pulp Fiction	Directed Quentin Tarantino's scene (uncredited)
1997	Mimic	Directed some scenes (uncredited)
1997	Scream 2	Directed the movie-within-a-movie titled Stab (Contrary to the mention of his name, Robert Rodriguez did not direct the scenes of "Stab", the movie-within-a-movie. They were instead directed by the Scream 2's director, Wes Craven. This is why Rodriguez's name does not appear in the actual credits for the film, and only within the movie itself. [IMDB])
1999	From Dusk Till Dawn 2: Texas Blood Money	Direct-to-video; Executive producer
2004	Kill Bill: Volume 2	Composer
2004	Kill Bill: The Whole Bloody Affair	Composer

== Television ==
Year	Title	Credited as				Notes
Year	Title	Director	Executive Producer	Writer	Creator	Notes
1994	Roadracers	Yes	Yes	Yes	Yes	Television film
2014	El Mariachi	No	No	Story	No	Based on his film of the same name.
2014–2016	From Dusk till Dawn: The Series	Yes	Yes	Yes	Yes	Directed 7 episodes Wrote episode: "Pilot"
2014–2016	The Director's Chair	Yes	Yes	No	Yes	Also host and editor; Directed 12 episodes
2014	Matador	Yes	Yes	No	No	Directed 2 episodes
2014–2018	Lucha Underground	No	Yes	No	No	
2018	Spy Kids: Mission Critical	No	Yes	No	Yes	
2020	The Mandalorian	Yes	No	No	No	Episode: "Chapter 14: The Tragedy"
2021	Rebel Without a Crew: The Robert Rodriguez Film School	No	Yes	No	Yes	Also host
2021–2022	The Book of Boba Fett	Yes	Yes	No	No	Directed 3 episodes

=== Acting roles ===
Year	Title	Role	Note
1997	Nash Bridges	Marlo Veras, Commercial Director	Episode "Bombshell"
2000	Deadline	Chicago SWAT Lt.	Episode "Pilot"
2011	The Cleveland Show	Himself	Voice role; Episode "Hot Cocoa Bang Bang"
2017	Uncle Grandpa	Himself	Voice role; Episode "New Direction"
2021–2022	The Book of Boba Fett	Dokk Strassi, Mok Shaiz	Voice role, 5 episodes

== Music videos ==
Year	Title	Artist(s)
2010	"40 Dogs (Like Romeo and Juliet)"	Bob Schneider
2015	"Confident"	Demi Lovato
2020	"Rain On Me"	Lady Gaga and Ariana Grande
2022	"Off the Ground"	Haley Reinhart
2025	"The End"	Mammoth

== See also ==
- Robert Rodriguez's unrealized projects
- Cinema of the United States

== Bibliography ==
- "Robert Rodriguez Movie Box Office Results". Box Office Mojo.
- "Robert Rodriguez > Filmography". Allmovie.
