= Mexico Trilogy =

- Official trilogy DVD cover artwork
- Directed by: Robert Rodriguez
- Written by: Robert Rodriguez
- Produced by: Robert Rodriguez; Carlos Gallardo; Elizabeth Avellan
- Starring: Carlos Gallardo; Antonio Banderas
- Cinematography: Robert Rodriguez; Guillermo Navarro
- Edited by: Robert Rodriguez
- Music by: Eric Guthrie; Chris Knudson; Álvaro Rodriguez; Cecilio Rodriguez; Mark Trujillo; Los Lobos; Robert Rodriguez
- Distributed by: Columbia Pictures; Dimension Films
- Running time: 289 minutes
- Countries: United States; Mexico
- Languages: English; Spanish
- Budget: $36,007,000 (3 films)
- Box office: $125 million (3 films)

The Mexico Trilogy (also known as the Desperado Trilogy on some released DVD products) is a series of American/Mexican contemporary western action films written and directed by Robert Rodriguez. The series' plot tells the continuing story of El Mariachi, a man who painfully lives alone after seeing all of his loved ones die. El Mariachi was portrayed by actors Carlos Gallardo and Antonio Banderas. The films were originally released in theatres from 1992 to 2003, and later on home video as a collection in 2010.

== Development ==
The trilogy began with the 1992 ultra low-budget production of El Mariachi. The film was made on a budget of only US$7,000 using 16-millimeter film, was shot entirely in Mexico with a mostly amateur cast, and was originally intended to go directly to the Mexican home-video market (a process detailed in Rodriguez's book Rebel Without a Crew). Rodriguez got some funds for the film by serving as a human guinea pig to science labs. Other finances came in the form of prize money won by his short student film, Bedhead, at film festival competitions.

Executives at Columbia Pictures liked the film so much that they bought the rights to it for American distribution. They eventually spent several times more than the film's original production budget on 35 millimeter-film transfers, a marketing campaign, and the eventual distribution/release of the film. It was so well received that they eventually chose to finance the second part of the trilogy, Desperado, and subsequently the final chapter, Once Upon a Time in Mexico.

== Films ==
Film	U.S. release date	Directed by	Written by	Produced by	El Mariachi
El Mariachi	February 26, 1993	Robert Rodriguez	Robert Rodriguez	Robert Rodriguez and Carlos Gallardo	Carlos Gallardo
Desperado	August 25, 1995	Robert Rodriguez	Robert Rodriguez	Robert Rodriguez and Bill Borden	Antonio Banderas
Once Upon a Time in Mexico	September 12, 2003	Robert Rodriguez	Robert Rodriguez	Robert Rodriguez, Carlos Gallardo, and Elizabeth Avellán	Antonio Banderas

=== El Mariachi (1993) ===
El Mariachi travels through Mexico as a musician. He arrives in a small town hoping to find work in the cantinas and clubs. Troubled locals mistake him for a recently escaped convict who has been hunting down his former associates, and killing them with weapons carried in his guitar case. El Mariachi falls in love with a woman who helps hide him, but he sees her killed by those hunting him. He seeks revenge for her death.

=== Desperado (1995) ===
The unfortunate adventures of El Mariachi continue, following his quest for love and his thirst for revenge.

=== Once Upon a Time in Mexico (2003) ===
A failed coup attempt on the President of Mexico is stopped by the heroic actions of El Mariachi. He sets out to avenge the murder of his wife and daughter, and discovers a connection between the marauders and their deaths.

== Television series ==
Series	Season	Episodes	Originally released			Executive producers
Series	Season	Episodes	First released	Last released	Network	Executive producers
El Mariachi	1	71	March 10, 2014	June 17, 2014	AXN	Daniel Ucros, Juan Pablo Posada, and Gabriela Valentán

=== El Mariachi (2014) ===
In August 2013, Sony Pictures Television announced a TV series adaptation of El Mariachi. Filming took place in Mexico with Iván Arana as the lead and Martha Higareda and Julio Brancho in supporting roles. Initially set to premiere on Sony Channel, the Spanish-language series premiered on AXN across Latin America on March 20, 2014. El Mariachi ran for one season consisting of 71 episodes—airing on MundoFox in the United States and MBC Action in the Middle East.

== Cast and crew ==
List indicator

This section includes characters who will appear or have appeared in more than two films in the series.

- An empty grey cell indicates the character was not in the film, or that the character's official presence has not yet been confirmed.

=== Principal cast ===
Character	El Mariachi (1992)	Desperado (1995)	Once Upon a Time in Mexico (2003)
"El Mariachi"	Carlos Gallardo	Antonio Banderas	Antonio Banderas
Dominó	Consuelo Gómez	Consuelo Gómez	
Mauricio "Moco"	Peter Marquardt	Peter Marquardt	
"Azul"	Reinol Martínez		
Cesar "Bucho"		Joaquim de Almeida	
Carolina		Salma Hayek	Salma Hayek
Buscemi		Steve Buscemi	
CIA Agent Sands			Johnny Depp
Billy Chambers			Mickey Rourke
Ajedrez			Eva Mendes

=== Additional crew and production details ===
Film	Crew/detail					
Film	Composer(s)	Cinematographer	Editor	Production companies	Distributing company	Running time
El Mariachi	Eric Guthrie, Chris Knudson, Álvaro Rodriguez, Cecilio Rodriguez, and Mark Trujillo	Robert Rodriguez	Robert Rodriguez	Columbia Pictures; Los Hooligans Productions	Columbia Pictures	81 minutes
Desperado	Los Lobos	Guillermo Navarro	Robert Rodriguez	Columbia Pictures; Los Hooligans Productions	Sony Pictures Releasing	105 minutes
Once Upon a Time in Mexico	Robert Rodriguez	Robert Rodriguez	Robert Rodriguez	Columbia Pictures; Dimension Films; Troublemaker Studios	Sony Pictures Releasing	102 minutes

== Reception ==
=== Box office ===
All three films were made using Rodriguez's "Mariachi-style" of filmmaking in which (according to the back cover of his book Rebel Without a Crew) "creativity, not money, is used to solve problems." Made on low budgets, all three movies have been extremely profitable. El Mariachi was made for $7,000 and grossed more than $2 million in its theatrical release. Desperado was made for $7 million and grossed over $25.5 million in US theaters. Once Upon a Time in Mexico was made for $29 million and grossed over $56.3 million domestically, and an additional $41.0 million worldwide.

=== Awards and critical reaction ===
Each installment of the Mexico Trilogy has won various prestigious awards. El Mariachi won the Audience Award at the 1993 Sundance Film Festival and the 1993 Deauville American Film Festival, as well as Best First Feature at the 1994 Independent Spirit Awards. Desperado saw Salma Hayek nominated for Best Supporting Actress at the 1996 Saturn Awards, and was nominated for the Bronze Horse at the 1995 Stockholm Film Festival. Once Upon a Time in Mexico won two Imagen Foundation Awards for performances by Antonio Banderas and Rubén Blades. The film was also nominated for two Satellite Awards, winning Robert Rodriguez an award for Best Song ("Siente Mi Amor") and recognizing Johnny Depp with a nomination for Best Performance by an Actor in a Supporting Role, Comedy or Musical. The movie's impressive stunts landed it two Taurus World Stunt Awards nominations.

Film	Rotten Tomatoes	Metacritic	CinemaScore
El Mariachi	91% (76 reviews)	73 (9 reviews)	–
Desperado	70% (53 reviews)	55 (18 reviews)	B+
Once Upon a Time in Mexico	66% (168 reviews)	56 (34 reviews)	B−
