= Bandido (2004 film) =

- Directed by: Roger Christian
- Written by: Scott Duncan
- Starring: Carlos Gallardo
- Cinematography: Mike Southon
- Release date: 2004
- Running time: 95 minutes
- Countries: Mexico; United States
- Language: English

Bandido ("Bandit") is a 2004 action thriller film written by Scott Duncan and Carlos Gallardo and directed by Roger Christian. The story revolves around the CIA framing skilled thief Max Cruz, a.k.a. "Bandido" (Gallardo), in order to gain his cooperation in helping them recover intelligence data that was stolen by Beno Gildemontes (Kim Coates), a Mexican Crime lord.

== Cast ==
- Carlos Gallardo as Max "Bandido" Cruz
- Edy Arellano as Armas
- Michel Bos as CIA Agent
- Kim Coates as Beno
- Matt Craven as Fletcher
- Marintia Escobedo as "Scar"
- Angie Everhart as Natalie
- Ana La Salvia as Sofia
- Karyme Lozano as Rosalia (as Carime Lozano)
- Wes Martinez as Max Barcus
- Verónica Segura as Delgado
- Manuel Vela as Peña
- Ernesto Yáñez as Quintana

== Release and reception ==
The film was released December 10, 2004 by Innovation Film Group. Carlos Gallardo came up with the idea for the film directly after his involvement with cult classic El Mariachi. He created that movie for a mere $7,000.
