= Robert Rodriguez's unrealized projects =

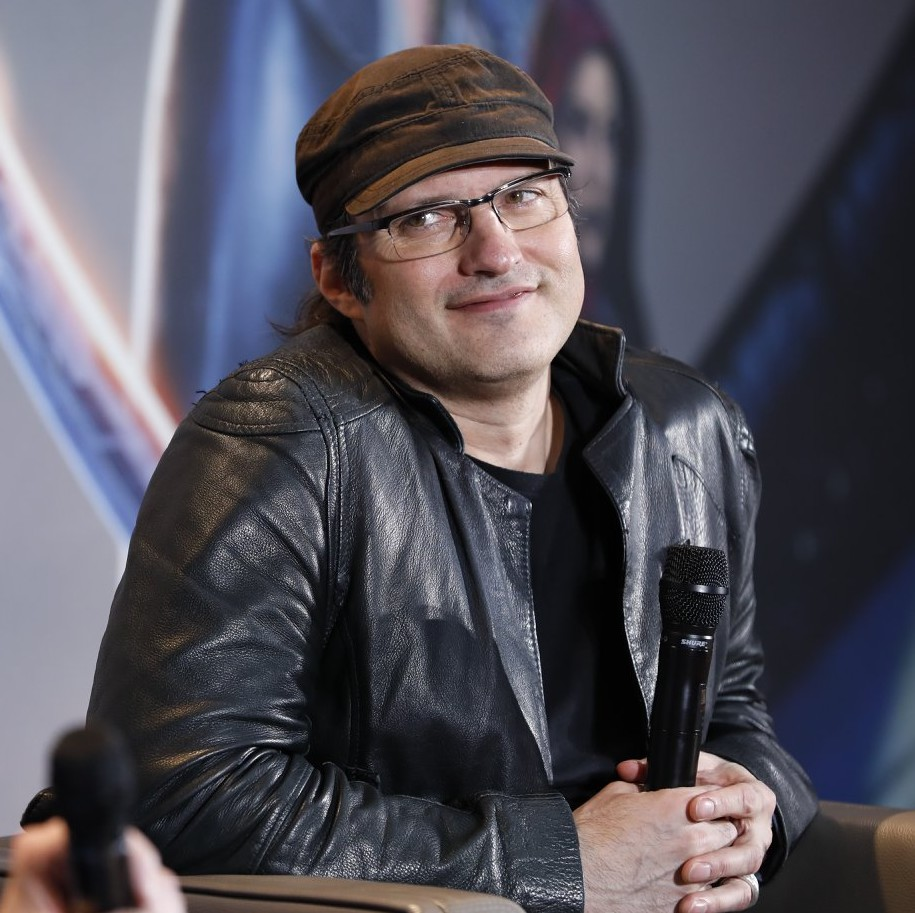
Rodriguez in 2019

During his long career, film director Robert Rodriguez has worked on a number of projects which never progressed beyond the pre-production stage under his direction. Some of these projects are officially cancelled or fell apart in development.

== 1990s ==
=== Madman film ===
In 1998, Rodriguez acquired the film rights to Mike Allred's Madman comics. Both he and Allred gave numerous signals as to the start of production over the years, but as both had been occupied with other projects (Allred was instrumental in connecting Rodriguez with Frank Miller, leading to the production of Sin City), no results emerged despite both remaining eager to see the film made. In a 2000 interview, Allred mentioned that he had had contact with Robin Williams for the role of Dr. Flem. At a February 2006 appearance at WonderCon, Allred announced that he and Rodriguez hoped to begin filming in May of that year, he teased fans in attendance by saying that the titular role had already been cast, "but I can't tell you who it is yet." However, in December 2006, it was announced that George Huang would take over writing/directing duties, with Rodriguez stepping back to a producer role, in a January 2007 interview, Allred indicated that no roles had been cast yet.

In 2015, Allred indicated on Twitter that the rights to Madman had reverted to him, and in June 2018, stated that a film production "would have to take a set up even better than what I had with [Robert Rodriguez]" which he considered unlikely.

=== Predators ===
In 1994, Rodriguez wrote an early script for a third Predator film for 20th Century Fox while he was working on Desperado at the time. Rodriguez presented the script to the studio, but was denied when they realized that the budget would be too large. Fifteen years later, the studio decided to go with his script. Rodriguez stated:

It's the story from that script I had written way back then. They had hired me to write a Predator story while I was waiting to do Desperado back in 1995. It was crazy, this thing I came up with. So then fast-forward to now and, like, six months ago, they found the script and called me up. 'Hey, we want to redo this franchise and we found your old script. This is where we should have gone with the series! We want to move forward.' And that's what we're doing.

In 2009, 20th Century Fox studio executive, Alex Young, called Rodriguez to consider using his treatment to revive the individual Predator franchise. Predators was produced at Rodriguez's Troublemaker Studios as opposed to 20th Century Fox so that Rodriguez had more creative control over the film. It was originally thought that Rodriguez would direct, but on July 1, 2009, Nimród Antal was officially signed on to direct.

=== The Mask of Zorro ===
In 1995, Rodriguez signed on to direct The Mask of Zorro with Antonio Banderas for TriStar Pictures and Amblin Entertainment. TriStar and Amblin were impressed with Rodriguez's low budget filmmaking, however, he pulled out of the project in 1996 due to budgetary problems. Rodriguez wanted a budget of $45 million and the studio only wanted to do a $35 million film. The film was eventually released in 1998, directed by Martin Campbell, who reteamed with Banderas in 2005's The Legend of Zorro.

=== Scream 2 ===
Following the success of Scream in 1996, Rodriguez was approached by Kevin Williamson and the filmmakers of the Scream franchise about directing Scream 2 due to Wes Craven's hesistancy over directing the sequel due to being worried about career opportunities he may not have if he was "trapped" within the franchise. Rodriguez was willing to take the offer, but ultimately, Craven felt unable to leave the sequel to someone else and agreed to helm the sequel, so Rodriguez moved over to direct The Faculty, also penned by Williamson.

=== Kiss Me Deadly remake ===
On the director's commentary track for Sin City, Robert Rodriguez said that he had been attached, in 1997 or 1998, to direct a remake of the 1955 film noir Kiss Me Deadly. It was to have been produced by Michael Mann. Rodriguez said he left the project because he thought it was "too nostalgic".

== 2000s ==
=== Animated Spy Kids series and direct-to-DVD Spy Kids 4 ===
In 2001, Rodriguez thought about exploring other avenues for the Spy Kids franchise after Spy Kids 2: The Island of Lost Dreams. Rodriguez is quoted as saying "TV, animation, specials, books, rides and toys. We're keeping the brand of Spy Kids alive." In 2002, he then said it may continue as a cartoon series after Spy Kids 3-D: Game Over. In the director's commentary on the Spy Kids 3 DVD, Rodriguez mentioned that he wrote several little story synopses for said cartoon series, one of which was an episode where Valentin chased down an old enemy who put him in the wheelchair, and by the end he just wanted to find him to forgive him, and Rodriguez liked the idea so much he worked it in Spy Kids 3's storyline. In 2005, Rodriguez also thought about making a fourth Spy Kids movie, which would have been animated and direct-to-DVD. Neither the movie or the cartoon ever materialized.

There was eventually both a live-action fourth movie in 2011, Spy Kids: All the Time in the World, and an animated CGI reboot show on Netflix in 2018, Spy Kids: Mission Critical.

=== John Carter ===
In 2004, Rodriguez signed on to direct the film John Carter after his friend Harry Knowles showed him Mark Protosevich's script. Recognizing that Knowles had been an adviser to many other filmmakers, Rodriguez asked him to be credited as a producer. Filming was set to begin in 2005, with Rodriguez planning to use the all-digital stages he was using for his production of Sin City, a film based on the graphic novel series by Frank Miller. Rodriguez planned to hire Frank Frazetta, the popular Burroughs and fantasy illustrator, as a designer on the film. Rodriguez had previously stirred-up film industry controversy owing to his decision to credit Sin City's artist/creator Miller as co-director on the film adaptation, as a result, Rodriguez decided to resign from the Directors Guild of America. In 2004, unable to employ a non-DGA filmmaker, Paramount assigned Kerry Conran to direct and Ehren Kruger to rewrite the script. The rights to the film would be acquired by The Walt Disney Company, and would be eventually see release in 2012, directed by Andrew Stanton and written by Stanton, Mark Andrews, and Michael Chabon.

=== Barbarella remake ===
In May 2007, it was announced that Rodríguez had signed on to direct a remake of Barbarella for a 2008 release. At the 2007 Comic-Con convention, actress Rosario Dawson announced that because of Barbarella, production of Sin City: A Dame to Kill For would be put on hold. She also announced that she would be playing an amazon in the Barbarella film. As of June 2008, plans to remake the film Barbarella with Rose McGowan as the lead have been delayed; the actress and director are instead remaking the film Red Sonja.

=== Red Sonja remake ===
A second Red Sonja film had been in development for several years. In 2008, Rodriguez and his production company Troublemaker Studios were working on a version that would have starred Rose McGowan as the titular character.

=== Woman in Chains! ===
In May 2008, Rodriguez was shopping around a prison drama television series called Woman in Chains!, with Rose McGowan being a possibility for a lead role.

=== Grindhouse 2 ===
Both Rodriguez and Quentin Tarantino have said that they are interested in making a sequel to Grindhouse. Tarantino said that he wants to shoot an "old-school Kung Fu movie in Mandarin with subtitles in some countries, and release a shorter, dubbed cut in others" for his segment. It has also been reported by Rotten Tomatoes that Edgar Wright may expand Don't into a feature film. According to Eli Roth, he and Edgar Wright have discussed the possibility of pairing Don't with Thanksgiving for a Grindhouse sequel. Roth is quoted as saying "We're talking to Dimension about it. I think they're still trying to figure out Grindhouse 1 before we think about Grindhouse 2, but I've already been working on the outline for it and I would do it in a heartbeat."

Electra and Elise Avellan, Rodriguez's nieces who play the Crazy Babysitter Twins in both films, originally stated their uncle wanted to do a sequel featuring both Machete and The Babysitter Twins, but the latter concept did not materialize with the former's release. In an interview, Electra Avellan discussed a sequel with "Robert mentioned something about the end of the world and Hollywood action films, where we'd be trained in Mexico to come back here and fight."

=== The Jetsons film ===
In May 2007, Rodriguez was in talks with Universal Pictures and Warner Bros. to make a live-action film adaptation of the 1960s Hanna-Barbera television show The Jetsons for a potential 2009 theatrical release, while also offered at the time to direct a film adaptation of Land of the Lost with Universal. Rodriguez was uncertain which project he would pursue next, though the latest script draft for The Jetsons by Adam F. Goldberg was further along in development.

=== Nerverackers ===
In February 2009, Rodriguez was set to write and direct a sci-fi film Nerverackers for Dimension Films, which was going to be released on April 10, 2010 until it was removed from the schedule in August 2009.

== 2010s ==
=== Predators 2 ===
Nimród Antal had talked about a direct sequel to Predators and said he would love to do one. Rodriguez has said that he has interest in a sequel because of the large number of potential ideas the Predator planet setting provides:

There are so many great ideas... Just following Laurence Fishburne's character (Noland) around in a prequel would be a great movie. Just the tales he tells in this movie alone, I want to see those experiences... That's why I wasn't precious even about the original script I had, because once you come up with the idea of a Predator Planet, that Predators use as their hunting grounds and humans are involved somehow, the story ideas that you can come up with are so numerous that you can come up with any approach. So we already have several ideas that we can go with for a sequel. They would all be good ideas but we would probably put them together to see which one rises to the top, if we made another one.

In 2010, Rodriguez confirmed that there would eventually be a Predators sequel:

"[The studio] said, 'Let's do some other ones. What other story ideas do you have?'" says the filmmaker. "Because it was like, let's test out the market with this one. They really wanted it to be pretty contained, pretty scaled-back. They didn't want to put too many of the ideas into it that we could save for a second one. So we could see what the appetite was, because the bigger movie would actually be what comes following that. That kind of sets up a new storyline, new location and world, and then you can really go crazy from there."

Adrien Brody also spoke about reprising his role in a possible sequel:

"I think a lot of that is determined by the success of the film. And I don't think that far ahead. The idea of reprising the role and going farther into that character is interesting to me... It would be exciting to watch a character progress or deteriorate. That's exciting for an actor. I thoroughly enjoyed playing Royce. Again, part of the attraction is I'm oddly drawn to material that affects me on an emotional level, and characters that are dealing with things that are challenging that I would question, that I'm not so familiar with. Royce has his emotional arc in this that most of the characters I've played don't come close to possessing. That's an interesting thing to cultivate."

In June 2014, Fox announced plans for a new movie, with Shane Black co-writing and directing, Fred Dekker co-writing and John Davis producing (without the involvement of Rodriguez). At the time, Black said the film is a sequel, rather than a reboot. In August 2015, Davis said the film would "reinvent the franchise." In November 2016, it was explained that since the plot takes place on Earth, the story will be more closely linked to the first two films. In December 2017, it was announced that while the film would acknowledge the events of Predator and Predator 2, but before the events of Predators.

=== From Dusk Till Dawn 4 ===
In December 2010, the production of a fourth From Dusk till Dawn film was in the planning stages, but further work on this possibility has not been revealed. In November 2013, it was reported that From Dusk till Dawn: The Series had begun production, without any further mention of the film.

=== Fire and Ice remake ===
In 2010, Rodriquez had plans to make a live-action remake of the 1983 cult classic Fire and Ice, originally directed by Ralph Bakshi. Despite wanting no involvement in the remake, Bakshi agreed to license the rights to Rodriguez. The deal closed shortly after the death of Fire and Ice's concept artist Frank Frazetta. By December 2014, Sony Pictures Entertainment acquired the rights to make the remake, with Rodriguez still attached to direct the film.

=== Heavy Metal remake ===
In July 2011, Rodriguez announced at San Diego Comic-Con that he had purchased the film rights to Heavy Metal and planned to develop a new animated film at the new Quick Draw Studios. On March 11, 2014, with the formation of his very own television network, El Rey, Rodriguez considered switching gears and bringing it to TV.

=== Spy Kids 5 ===
Dimension Films had announced the fifth installment in the Spy Kids series following Spy Kids: All the Time in the World. It was under talks to have the original cast expected to return. However, the film was permanently delayed from its intended 2012 production, as the film's stars Rowan Blanchard and Mason Cook, who are no longer kids, were both committing to current projects (Girl Meets World and Speechless respectively), and the planned sequel got cancelled as a result.

There was eventually a fifth film in 2023, Spy Kids: Armageddon, which served as a reboot of the franchise and released on Netflix.

=== Machete Kills Again... In Space ===
At the end of the first film's theatrical version, two sequels are mentioned, Machete Kills and Machete Kills Again. The trailer for the third film titled, Machete Kills Again... In Space, precedes the second film as a "Coming Attraction". In 2015, Trejo told Halloween Daily News that the third film is happening. Machete Kills grossed a worldwide total of $15 million, on a budget of $20 million, making a sequel unlikely. In 2022, when asked about the progress of the project, Trejo said, "Send an email to Robert Rodriguez and tell him to stop being afraid and do it!" In 2023, Rodriguez addressed the possibility of making Machete in Space stating that "we have to do it [and] give it to them."

=== Sin City 3 ===
Wallace is set to appear in Sin City 3, to be directed by Rodriguez and Frank Miller. Rodriguez has said he wants Johnny Depp to play the part. Depp was originally supposed to play the part of Benicio del Toro's Jack "Jackie Boy" Rafferty. However, filming of Sin City conflicted with that of Depp's movies. Depp has expressed great interest in being a part of the Sin City franchise. Frank Miller revealed at the 2014 Comic-Con that he and director Robert Rodriguez have had discussions about a potential third Sin City film. Miller said at the event, "So you better show up for number two, or they won't pay for it." Sin City: A Dame to Kill For grossed a worldwide total of $39.4 million, against a production budget of $65 million, making a sequel unlikely.

=== Jonny Quest film ===
In May 2015, it was announced that Rodriguez would direct a live-action adaptation of Jonny Quest, with a script co-written by Rodriguez and Terry Rossio. Adrian Askarieh has stated to IGN that the film will be Indiana Jones meets James Bond with a PG-13 rating.

In July 2016, Forbes reported that the film would start a franchise with Rodriguez and Rossio's script and will be directed by either Joe Cornish, Justin Lin or Scott Derrickson. The film will position Jonny in the film as "Harry Potter inside an Indiana Jones movie" and specifically sets the film up with the potential for spinoffs. The script also took inspiration from a few specific stories and elements in the original 1960s TV show. The site reported that the studio was considering actors Idris Elba, Bradley Cooper and Will Smith for the role of Race Bannon.

In November 2018, Warner Bros. announced that the movie would be instead directed by Chris McKay.

=== Escape from New York remake ===
In March 2017, it was announced that Rodriguez will direct the remake of the 1981 dystopian sci-fi action film Escape from New York, with the original's director Carpenter producing. In February 2019, new development surfaced when Leigh Whannell and Luther creator Neil Cross were hired by 20th Century Fox to write a new script.

=== UglyDolls ===
On March 28, 2017, Rodriguez signed on to direct, write, and produce the film UglyDolls. He was replaced by Kelly Asbury, after Rodriguez left production to focus on Alita: Battle Angel. He remained intact with a producer and story credit. In May 2018, Hulu signed a deal with STX Entertainment to produce an animated television series based on the film of the same name. Hulu also gained VOD rights to the animated film. The series was meant to consist of 26 episodes per season with a projected release date of early 2020.

=== Alita: Battle Angel 2 ===
James Cameron and Rodriguez have hinted that Alita: Battle Angel could lead to multiple sequels. On February 6, 2019, they announced that they have plans for Alita: Battle Angel 2 in the future. The casting of Edward Norton in a non-speaking role as Nova in this film was intended to be a setup for the sequel. Additionally, the uncredited cameos by Michelle Rodriguez and Jai Courtney were meant to set up larger roles in a sequel. In July 2019, Salazar urged fans to buy the film on physical media and expressed her hope that a sequel would be made.

In an interview with BBC Radio 1, Cameron explained the reason for rearranging the film title from the initial source material, allowing the possibilities of sequel titles, "It's Alita, colon, Battle Angel. Because the next one will be "Alita: Fallen Angel" and then Alita... you know "Avenging Angel" and then Alita whatever. I mean, that's assuming we make some money". On December 2, 2019, John Landau, discussing the possibility of the sequel in an interview with CinemaBlend, said the following: "What I think the Alita Army should do is keep peppering our family now at Disney and [let them know] how important it is to have another Alita movie and hopefully we'll venture there one day." The film is listed with losses as high as $53 million, making a sequel unlikely.

However, in January 2021, director Rodriguez said that he was hoping that a sequel to the film would be made. In September 2021, during an interview with "The Nerdy Basement", Rodriguez claimed that he would try pitching an Alita sequel if The Book of Boba Fett series, directed by him, succeeded in "knock[ing] people's socks off". In December 2022, Rodriguez and Cameron took a virtual blood oath to make a sequel. In April 2023, producer Jon Landau confirmed that the sequel was in active development with Rodriguez and Rosa Salazar returning as director and star, respectively. In July the same year, James Cameron reiterated that he is working on more than one sequel. In November 2025, Cameron stated that Rodriguez and he were working on the script together and were committed to making it.

=== Cobra series ===
At the 2019 Cannes Film Festival, Sylvester Stallone revealed he had plans to reboot his 1986 action film Cobra as a streaming series, say "That (conceit) was what if Bruce Springsteen had a gun? That was rock n' roll meets drama. That should have been another franchise because that character was so cool. And I blew it. My personal life got in the way. But we're trying to bring it back as a streaming TV series. Bring out the zombie squad. I'm long gone, but the idea is really good." Later that year Stallone revealed to Fandango that "I'm talking with Robert Rodriguez right now about Cobra, which looks like that could happen," and that "It's basically his baby now."

=== El Gato ===
In September 2019, Rodriguez signed on as director and executive producer on the television series El Gato for Apple TV+. By February 2024, Rodriguez left the project, prior to Amazon Prime Video taking over from Apple TV+.

== 2020s ==
=== Zorro (TV series) ===
In December 2020, Rodriguez was set to executive produce a Zorro television series for NBC. In January 2022, the series was moved from NBC to The CW and later ordered six scripts. In September 2024, the series moved from The CW to CBS.

=== We Can Be Heroes 2 ===
In January 2021, Netflix announced they were planning to develop a sequel to Rodriguez's We Can Be Heroes. By August of the same year, Rodriguez confirmed that he would return in his role as director, while announcing that principal photography would take place in 2022.

=== Spy Kids: Armageddon sequels ===
In September 2023, Rodriguez confirmed that Netflix intended to develop additional Spy Kids movies, with the filmmaker expressing hope to begin production on a sequel the following year. Rodriguez explained that Spy Kids: Armageddon incorporated a new family because so much time had passed since Spy Kids: All the Time in the World, and so he wanted to incorporate a new set of characters before returning to what came before; confirming that he intends to bring back "legacy characters" from the previous installments in future movies.

=== The Faculty remake ===
In January 2025, Rodriguez was set to produce a remake of his film The Faculty (1998), with Drew Hancock writing the screenplay.

== See also ==
- Robert Rodriguez filmography
