= Katherine Willis =

American actress and producer

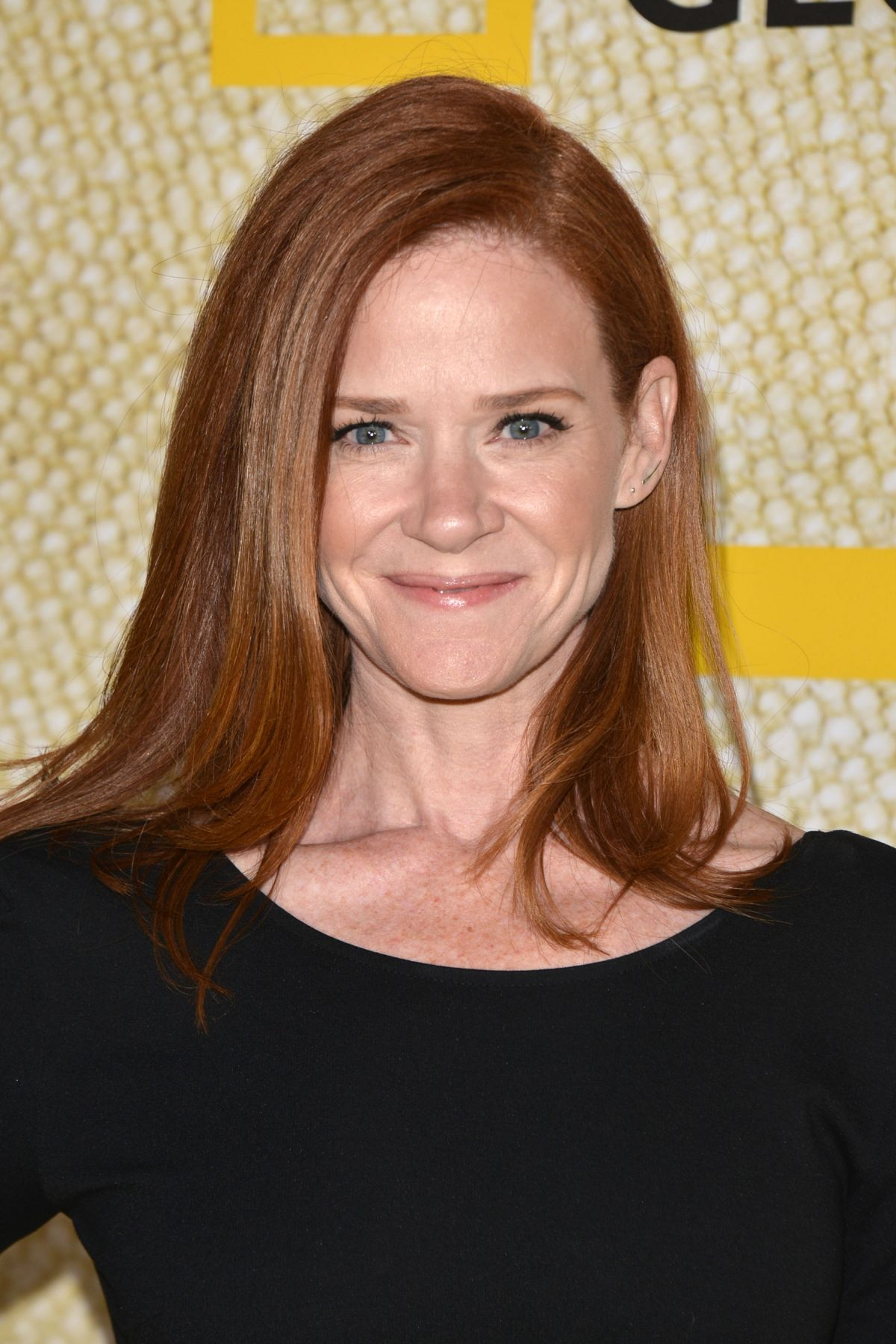
- Willis at The Long Road Home premiere, Los Angeles 2017
- Born: Kolofo'ou, Tonga
- Other name: Kat
- Occupations: Actress, film producer
- Years active: 1991–present
- Website: www.kwillis.com

Katherine Willis is an American actress and producer, best known for her roles as Myrtle Hale in Killers of the Flower Moon, Diana Lord in Tell Me Your Secrets, and Joanne Street in Friday Night Lights.

== Early life and education ==
Willis spent most of her childhood on a 200 acre farm in southwest Missouri.

She studied theater and film at Brigham Young University with a theater Talent Award Scholarship. She settled in Austin, Texas, in 1994 where most of her studio film and television credits are from.

== Filmography ==
=== Film ===
Year	Title	Role	Notes	Ref
1991	Little Heroes	Rachel Wilson		
1995	Pure Race	Kim Grey		
1998	The Faculty	Officer Campbell		
2001	The Right Girl	Lauren		
2003	The Life of David Gale	Bullhorn Protester		
2004	The Sum of Jobe	Dr. Wills	short film	
2004	Re-Elect Joe	Josephine Fitzsimmons	short film	
2004	Friday Night Lights	Racist Booster Wife		
2005	Sin City	Nurse		
2005	The Ringer	Ditzy Woman		
2006	Momma's Boy	Shelly	short film	
2006	Jumping Off Bridges	Mrs. Adams		
2006	The Return	Dorothy		
2007	Kabluey	Veronica		
2011	The Curse of Babylon	FBI Commander Ross		
2012	Deep in the Heart	Betty		
2012	The Sinner	Agent Valentine		
2013	This Is Where We Live	Leigh Ann		
2015	The Doo Dah Man	Becky		
2015	Divine Access	Becky		
2016	Mercury Plains	Mitch's Mom		
2019	Round of Your Life	Jenny		
2019	Red 11	Administrator Willis		
2019	By the Dark of Night	Helen	short film	
2023	Killers of the Flower Moon	Myrtle Hale		

=== Television ===
Year	Title	Role	Notes	Ref
1992	Little Heroes	Rachael Wilson	TV movie	
1992	Miracles & Other Wonders	Cassie Anders	TV series	
1993	Moment of Truth: Stalking Back	Jill Boyer	TV movie	
2001	Arrest & Trial	Mrs. McClellan	Episode: "Nightmare Nurse"	
2005	Three Wise Guys	Ruth Roberts	TV movie	
2006	Prison Break	FBI Agent Foley	Episode: "Manhunt"	
2006–2007	Friday Night Lights	Joanne Street	15 episodes	
2011	Drop Dead Diva	Catherine Gibson	Episode: "Toxic"	
2012–2013	The Lying Game	Nancy Rogers	4 episodes	
2014	Resurrection	Kimberly	3 episodes	
2014	Revolution	General Donagan	Episode: "Declaration of Independence"	
2014	Deliverance Creek	Cordelia	TV movie	
2015	The Leftovers	Violet's Mom	2 episodes	
2017	Queen of the South	SAC Agent Caryn Trusdale	Recurring	
2017	The Long Road Home	Cathy Smith	Recurring	
2018	Kidding	Mrs. Piccirillo	Episode: "The Cookie"	
2019	The Blacklist	Moira Tyche	Episode: "Lady Luck (No. 69)"	
2019	The Son	Olivia Bersen	Episode: "The Blue Light"	
2021	Tell Me Your Secrets	Diana Lord	Recurring	
