= Robert Rodriguez =

American filmmaker (born 1968)

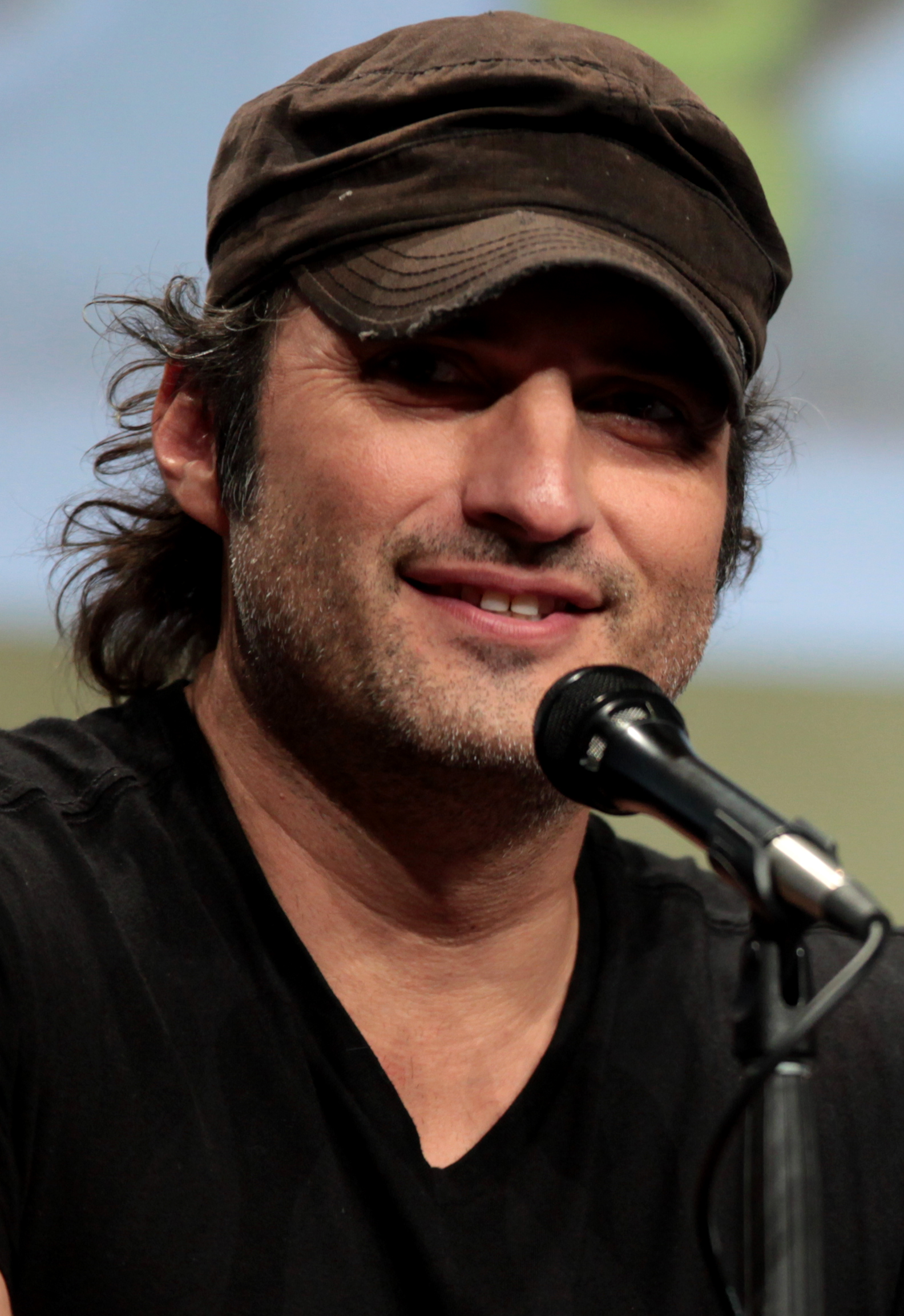
- Rodriguez at the 2014 San Diego Comic-Con
- Born: Robert Anthony Rodriguez; June 20, 1968 (age 58); San Antonio, Texas, U.S.
- Education: University of Texas at Austin
- Occupations: Film director; producer; screenwriter; cinematographer; visual effects supervisor; composer; film editor; chef; actor
- Years active: 1991–present
- Works: Full list
- Spouse: Elizabeth Avellán (m. 1991; div. 2008)
- Children: 5
- Relatives: Patricia Vonne (sister); Danny Trejo (second cousin); Diego Andres Rodriguez (nephew)
- Website: Troublemaker Studios

Robert Anthony Rodriguez (/rɒˈdriːɡɛz/ ro-DREE-ghez; born June 20, 1968) is an American filmmaker, composer, actor, chef and visual effects supervisor. He shoots, edits, produces, and scores many of his films in Mexico and in his home state of Texas. Rodriguez directed the 1992 action film El Mariachi, which was a commercial success after grossing $2.6 million ($5.5 million in 2023 dollars) against a budget of $7,000 ($14,937 in 2023 dollars). The film spawned two sequels known collectively as the Mexico Trilogy: Desperado (1995) and Once Upon a Time in Mexico (2003).

Rodriguez directed From Dusk till Dawn in 1996 and developed its television series adaptation (2014–2016). He co-directed the 2005 neo-noir crime thriller anthology Sin City (adapted from the graphic novel of the same name) and the 2014 sequel, Sin City: A Dame to Kill For. He is also the creator of the Spy Kids franchise, as well as The Adventures of Sharkboy and Lavagirl in 3-D (2005), Planet Terror (2007), Machete (2010), We Can Be Heroes (2020), and also directed The Faculty (1998) and Alita: Battle Angel (2019).

Rodriguez is a close friend and frequent collaborator of filmmaker Quentin Tarantino, who founded the production company A Band Apart, of which Rodriguez was a member. In December 2013, Rodriguez launched his own cable television channel, El Rey.

== Early life ==
Rodriguez was born in San Antonio, Texas, the son of Mexican parents Rebecca (née Villegas), a nurse, and Cecilio G. Rodríguez, a salesman. He began his interest in film at age eleven, when his father bought one of the first VCRs, which came with a camera.

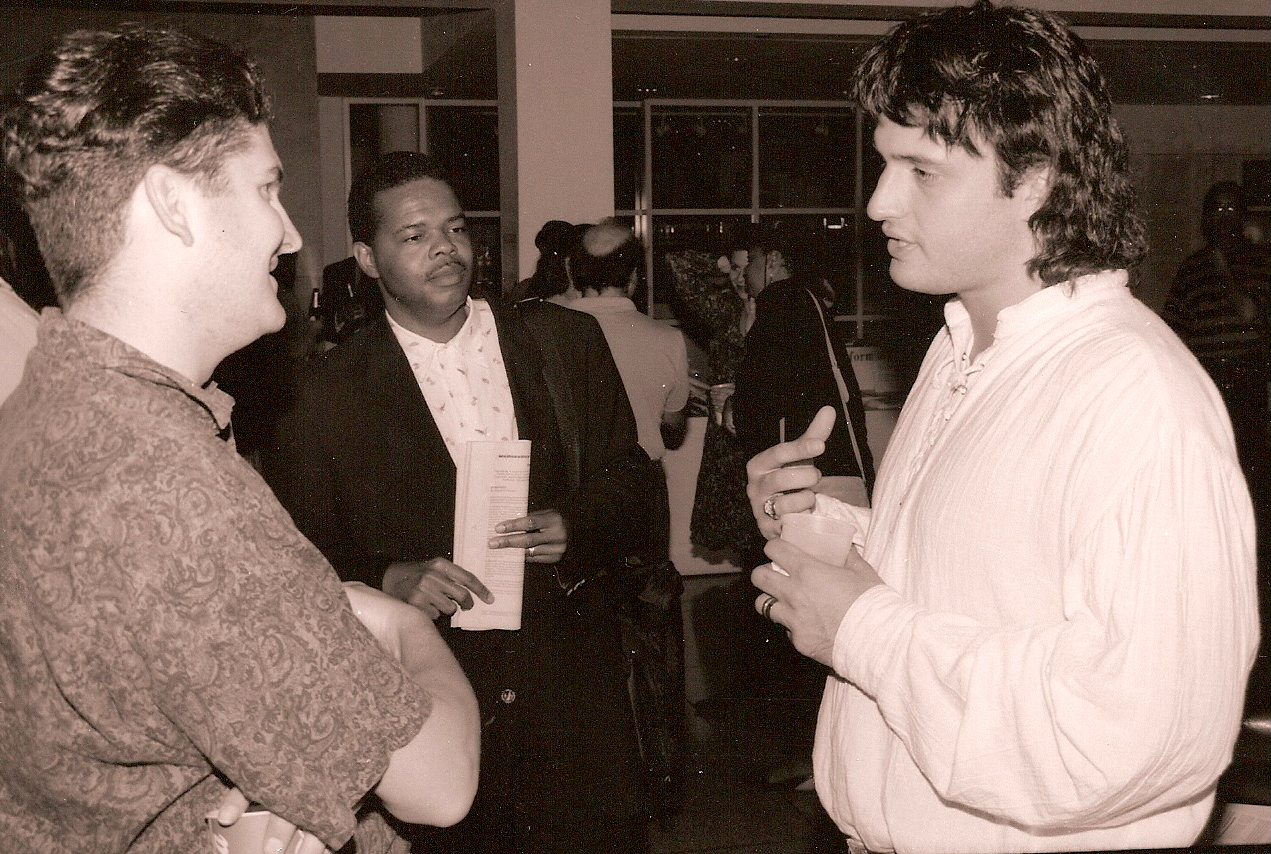
Robert Rodriguez (right) at the 1993 Atlanta Film Festival.

While attending St. Anthony High School Seminary in San Antonio, Rodriguez was commissioned to videotape the school's football games. According to his sister, he was fired soon afterward as he had shot footage in a cinematic style, getting shots of parents' reactions and the ball traveling through the air instead of shooting the whole play. In high school, he met Carlos Gallardo; they both shot films on video throughout high school and college.

Rodriguez went to the College of Communication at the University of Texas at Austin, where he also developed a love of cartooning. Not having grades high enough to be accepted into the school's film program, he created a daily comic strip entitled Los Hooligans. Many of the characters were based on his siblings – in particular, one of his sisters, Maricarmen. The comic ran for three years in the student newspaper The Daily Texan, while Rodriguez continued to make short films.

Rodriguez shot action and horror short films on video and edited on two VCRs. In late 1990, his entry in a local film contest earned him a spot in the university's film program. There he made the award-winning 16 mm short Bedhead (1991). The film chronicles the amusing misadventures of a young girl whose older brother sports an incredibly tangled mess of hair which she detests. Even at this early stage, Rodriguez's trademark style began to emerge: quick cuts, intense zooms, and fast camera movements deployed with a sense of humor.

Bedhead was recognized for excellence in the Black Maria Film Festival. It was selected by Film/Video Curator Sally Berger for the Black Maria 20th-anniversary retrospective at MoMA in 2006.

== Career ==
=== Early career ===
The short film Bedhead attracted enough attention to encourage him to seriously attempt a career as a filmmaker. He went on to shoot the action flick El Mariachi (1992) in Spanish; he shot it for around $7,000 with money raised by his friend Adrian Kano and from payments for his own participation in medical testing studies. During the process of these medical studies, he met Peter Marquardt, who went on to act in El Mariachi. Rodriguez won the Audience Award for this film at the Sundance Film Festival in 1993. Intended for the Spanish-language low-budget home-video market, the film was "cleaned up" by Columbia Pictures with post-production work costing several hundred thousand dollars before it was distributed in the United States. Its promotion still advertised it as "the movie made for $7,000". Rodriguez described his experiences making the film in his book Rebel Without a Crew (1995).

=== Mainstream success ===
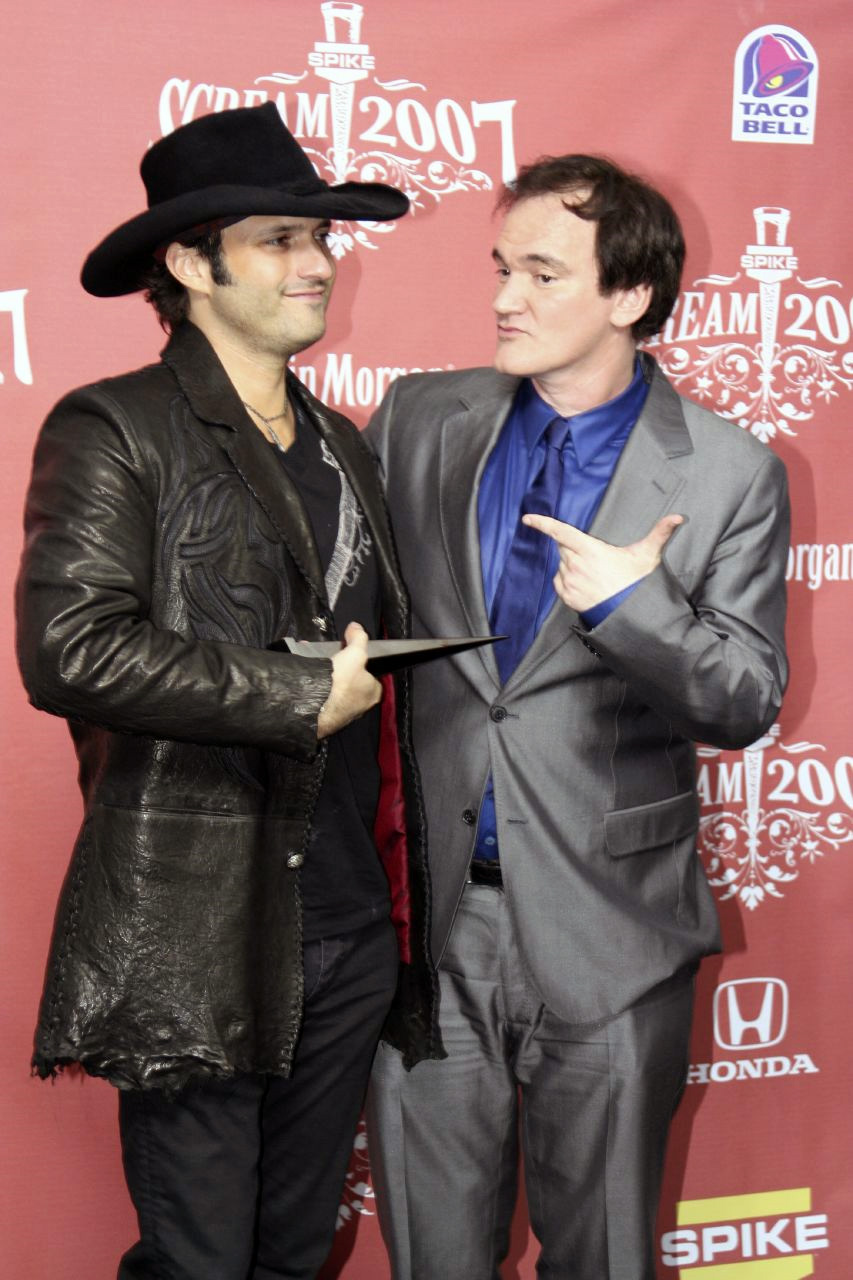
Rodriguez and Tarantino in 2007

Desperado was a sequel to El Mariachi that starred Antonio Banderas and introduced Salma Hayek to international audiences as her English-language breakthrough role. Rodriguez went on to collaborate with Quentin Tarantino on the vampire thriller From Dusk till Dawn (also both co-producing its two sequels), and he wrote, directed, and produced the TV series for his own cable network, El Rey. Rodriguez has also worked with Kevin Williamson, on the sci-fi thriller film The Faculty.

Rodriguez, formerly a member of Writers Guild of America West, left and maintained financial core status in 2001.

That year, Rodriguez enjoyed his first Hollywood hit with Spy Kids, which went on to become a movie franchise. A third "mariachi" film also appeared in late 2003, Once Upon a Time in Mexico, which completed the Mexico Trilogy (also called the Mariachi Trilogy). He operates a production company called Troublemaker Studios, formerly Los Hooligans Productions.

Rodriguez co-directed Sin City (2005), an adaptation of the comic books by Frank Miller; Quentin Tarantino guest-directed a scene. During production in 2004, Rodriguez insisted Miller be credited as co-director, because he considered the visual style of Miller's comic art to be just as important as his own in the film. However, the Directors Guild of America would not allow it, citing that only "legitimate teams", e.g. the Wachowskis, could share the director's credit. Rodriguez chose to resign from the DGA, stating: "It was easier for me to quietly resign before shooting because otherwise I'd be forced to make compromises I was unwilling to make or set a precedent that might hurt the guild later on". By resigning from the DGA, Rodriguez was forced to relinquish his director's seat on the film John Carter of Mars for Paramount Pictures. Rodriguez had already signed on and had been announced as director of that film, planning to begin filming soon after completing Sin City.

Sin City was a critical hit in 2005 as well as a box office success, particularly for a hyperviolent comic book adaptation that did not have name recognition comparable to the X-Men or Spider-Man. He has an interest in adapting all of Miller's Sin City comic books.

Rodriguez released The Adventures of Sharkboy and Lavagirl in 2005, a superhero-kid movie intended for the same younger audiences as his Spy Kids series. Sharkboy and Lavagirl was based on a story conceived by Rodriguez's seven-year-old son, Racer, who was given credit for the screenplay. The film grossed over $69 million worldwide at the box office.

Rodriguez wrote and directed the film Planet Terror as part of the double-bill release Grindhouse (2007). Quentin Tarantino directed Grindhouse's other film.

He has a series of "Ten Minute Film School" segments on several of his DVD releases, showing aspiring filmmakers how to make good, profitable movies using inexpensive tactics. Starting with the Once Upon a Time in Mexico DVD, Rodriguez began creating a series called "Ten Minute Cooking School" in which he revealed his recipe for "Puerco Pibil" (based on Cochinita pibil, an old dish from Yucatán), the same food Johnny Depp's character, Agent Sands, ate in the film. The popularity of this series led to the inclusion of another "Cooking School" on the two-disc version of the Sin City DVD where Rodriguez teaches the viewer how to make "Sin City Breakfast Tacos", a dish (made for his cast and crew during late-night shoots and editing sessions) utilizing his grandmother's tortilla recipe and different egg mixes for the filling. He had initially planned to release a third "Cooking School" with the DVD release of Planet Terror but then announced on the "Film School" segment of the DVD that he would put it on the Grindhouse DVD set instead. The Cooking School, titled "Texas Barbecue...from the GRAVE!", is a dish based on the "secret barbecue recipe" of JT Hague, Jeff Fahey's character in the film.

Rodriguez is a strong supporter of digital filmmaking, having been introduced to the practice by director George Lucas, who personally invited Rodriguez to use the digital cameras at Lucas's headquarters. He was presented with the Extraordinary Contribution to Filmmaking Award at the 2010 Austin Film Festival.

=== Predators ===
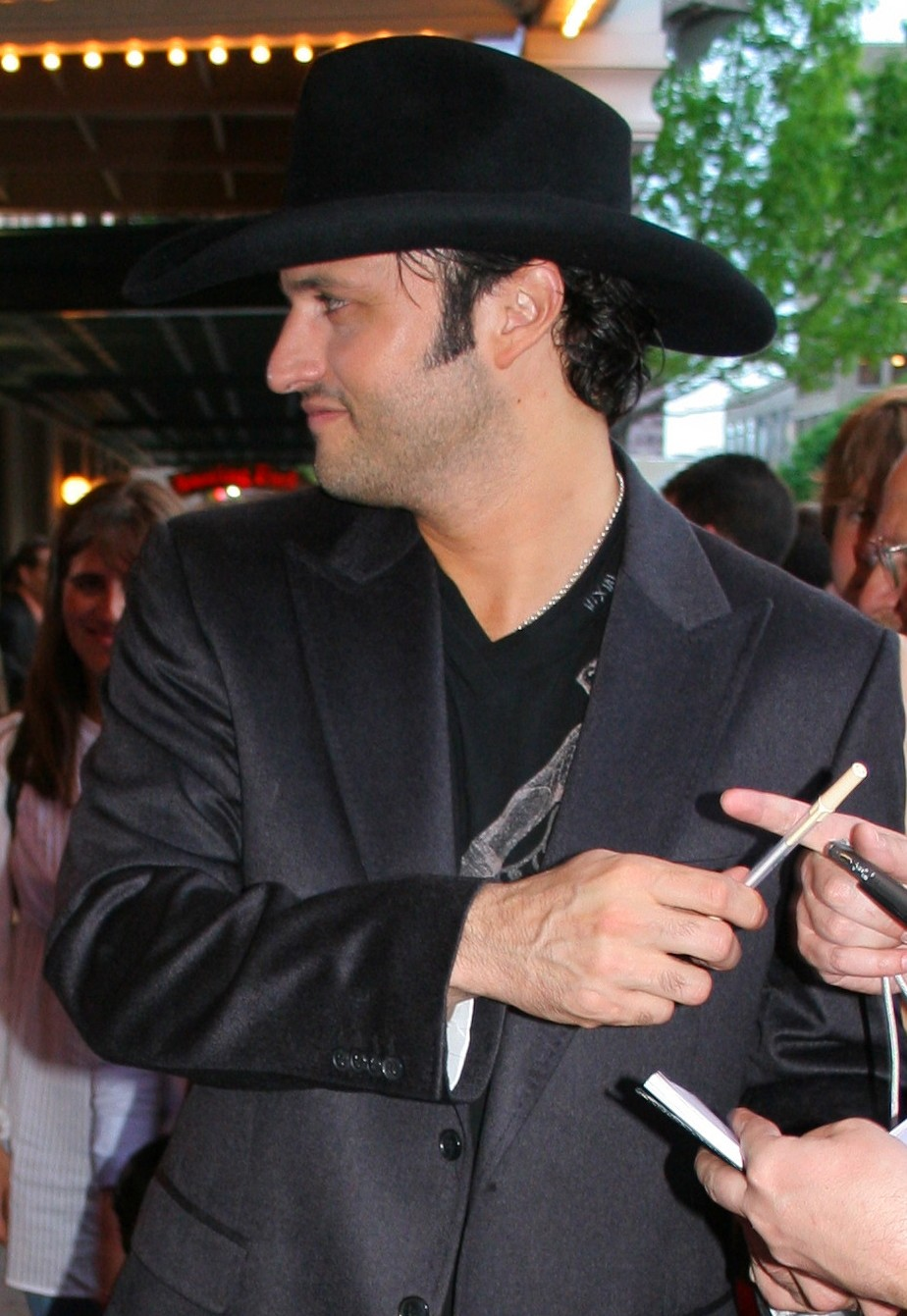
Rodriguez at the premiere of Grindhouse, Austin, Texas, 2007

In 2010, Rodriguez produced a new Predator sequel, entitled Predators. This film's script was based on early drafts he had written after seeing the original. Rodriguez's ideas included a planet-sized game preserve and various creatures used by the Predators to hunt a group of abducted yet skilled humans. Opening to mostly positive reviews, the film fared reasonably well at the box office.

=== Machete ===
Machete is a feature film directed by Rodriguez and released in September 2010. It is an expansion of a fake trailer Rodriguez directed for the 2007 film Grindhouse. It starred Danny Trejo as the title character. Trejo, Rodriguez's second cousin, has worked with him in some of his other movies such as Desperado, From Dusk till Dawn, Once Upon a Time in Mexico and Spy Kids, where Trejo first appeared as Machete. Although originally announced to be released direct-to-DVD as an extra on the Planet Terror DVD, the film was produced as a theatrical release.

According to Rodriguez, the origins of the film go back to Desperado. He says: "When I met Danny, I said, 'This guy should be like the Mexican Jean-Claude Van Damme or Charles Bronson, putting out a movie every year and his name should be Machete.' So I decided to do that way back when, never got around to it until finally now. So now, of course, I want to keep going and do a feature." In an interview with Rolling Stone magazine, Rodriguez said that he wrote the screenplay back in 1993 when he cast Trejo in Desperado. "So I wrote him this idea of a federale from Mexico who gets hired to do hatchet jobs in the U.S. I had heard sometimes FBI or DEA have a really tough job that they don't want to get their own agents killed on, they'll hire an agent from Mexico to come do the job for $25,000. I thought, "That's Machete. He would come and do a really dangerous job for a lot of money to him but for everyone else over here it's peanuts." But I never got around to making it."

Rodriguez hoped to film Machete at the same time as Sin City: A Dame to Kill For. Additionally, during Comic-Con International 2008, he took the time to speak about Machete, including such topics as: status, possible sequels after the release of Machete, and production priorities. It was also revealed that he has regularly pulled sequences from it for his other productions, including Once Upon a Time in Mexico. Machete was released in theaters September 3, 2010, in the U.S.

On May 5, 2010, Rodriguez responded to Arizona's controversial immigration law by releasing an "illegal" trailer on Ain't It Cool News. The fake trailer combined elements of the Machete trailer that appeared in Grindhouse with footage from the actual film, and implied that the film would be about Machete leading a revolt against anti-immigration politicians and border vigilantes. Several movie websites, including IMDb, reported that it was the official teaser for the film. However, Rodriguez later revealed the trailer to be a joke, explaining "it was Cinco de Mayo and I had too much tequila."

=== Streaming projects ===
In May 2020, Rodriguez announced, via an Instagram post in which he posed with a puppet of Grogu, that he would direct an episode from the second season of the Disney+ series The Mandalorian, part of the Star Wars franchise. He also tweeted a video of himself on the set of the episode playing a guitar next to Grogu. Rodriguez was also an executive producer on The Book of Boba Fett, a spin-off of The Mandalorian released in December 2021, where he also voiced Dokk Strassi and Mok Shaiz.

In 2020, Rodriguez wrote and directed We Can Be Heroes, a Sharkboy and Lavagirl spinoff, which was released on December 25, 2020, on Netflix to mixed reviews.

In August 2021, Rodriguez had signed a two-year first-look deal with HBO and HBO Max.

In 2023, he released Spy Kids: Armageddon on Netflix. The film received mixed reviews from critics.

=== Unrealized projects ===
Since 1998, Rodriguez has owned the film rights to Mike Allred's off-beat comic Madman. The two have hinted at the project being close to beginning on several occasions without anything coming of it. However, other projects have been completed first. (Allred was instrumental in connecting Rodriguez with Frank Miller, leading to the production of Sin City.) In 2004, Allred, while promoting his comic book The Golden Plates, announced that a screenplay by George Huang was near completion. Allred announced at the 2006 WonderCon that production would likely commence on Madman the Movie in 2006. Huang is friends with Rodriguez, who advised him to pursue filmmaking as a career when Rodriguez landed a deal with Columbia Pictures, where Huang was an employee.

In May 2007, it was announced that Rodriguez had signed on to direct a remake of Barbarella for a 2008 release. At the 2007 Comic-Con, actress Rosario Dawson announced that because of Barbarella, production of Sin City: A Dame to Kill For would be put on hold. She also announced that she would be playing an amazon in the Barbarella film. As of June 2008, plans to remake the Barbarella with Rose McGowan as the lead have been delayed; the actress and director were instead remaking the film Red Sonja.

In May 2008, Rodriguez was said to be shopping around a prison drama television series called Woman in Chains!, with Rose McGowan being a possibility for a lead role. In May 2009, Rodriguez planned to produce a live-action remake of Fire and Ice, a 1983 film collaboration between painter Frank Frazetta and animator Ralph Bakshi. The deal was closed shortly after Frazetta's death.

In 2011, Rodriguez announced at Comic-Con that he had purchased the film rights to Heavy Metal and planned to develop a new animated film at the new Quick Draw Studios.

In November 2015, it was announced that Rodriguez directed the film 100 Years, which would not be released until 2115.

In March 2017, it was announced that Rodriguez would direct a remake of the dystopian sci-fi action film Escape from New York, with original director John Carpenter producing.

=== Brass Knuckle Films ===
In March 2025, Rodriguez announced a new company called Brass Knuckle Films at SXSW in Austin, Texas. The studio is set to make five films, with Rodriguez directing at least one and serving as producer on the rest of the slate. Brass Knuckle Films is a unique approach to a studio as it invites the fans to be the investors. Investors also pitch their film ideas to Rodriguez for one of the films in the slate of films planned. BFK has raised $2 million in development money from 2,184 investors through Republic, an online fundraising platform.

In May 2026 Rodriguez and Brass Knuckle Films' cofounder Alexis Garcia met with potential buyers at the Cannes Film Festival to present a 5-Project slate: three Robert Rodriguez original movies and two investor-pitched ideas. Kicking off the inaugural slate is "Smooth Operators," an action film written by actor DJ Cotrona and "Fight or Flight" screenwriter Brooks McLaren, which Rodriguez is set to direct. Also in the works is "Future Proof," a character-driven action thriller written by "Carry On" screenwriter TJ Fixman and Rodriguez. The third Rodriguez project is an untitled action film set in the future he describes as his version of John Carpenter’s "Escape from New York." The duo also introduced Incógnito, that will be directed by Rodriguez, starring Jessica Alba and Michael Peña. Alba starred for the director in Sin City and Sin City. A Dame To Kill For. Production will take place at Rodriguez' Troublemaker Studios in Austin, Texas.

=== Appearances ===
Rodriguez has a chapter giving advice in Tim Ferriss's 2016 book Tools of Titans.

== Personal life ==
Rodriguez announced in April 2006 that he and his Venezuelan-American wife Elizabeth Avellán, with whom he had five children, had separated after 16 years of marriage.

He reportedly had a "dalliance" with actress Rose McGowan during the shooting of Grindhouse. In October 2007, Elle Magazine revealed that Rodriguez had cast McGowan in the title role in his remake of Barbarella. They split up in October 2009.

In October 2010, he walked Alexa Vega (Carmen Cortez in Spy Kids series) down the aisle at her wedding to producer Sean Covel.

In March 2014, Rodriguez showed his collection of Frank Frazetta original paintings in Austin, Texas, during the SXSW festival.

== Style ==
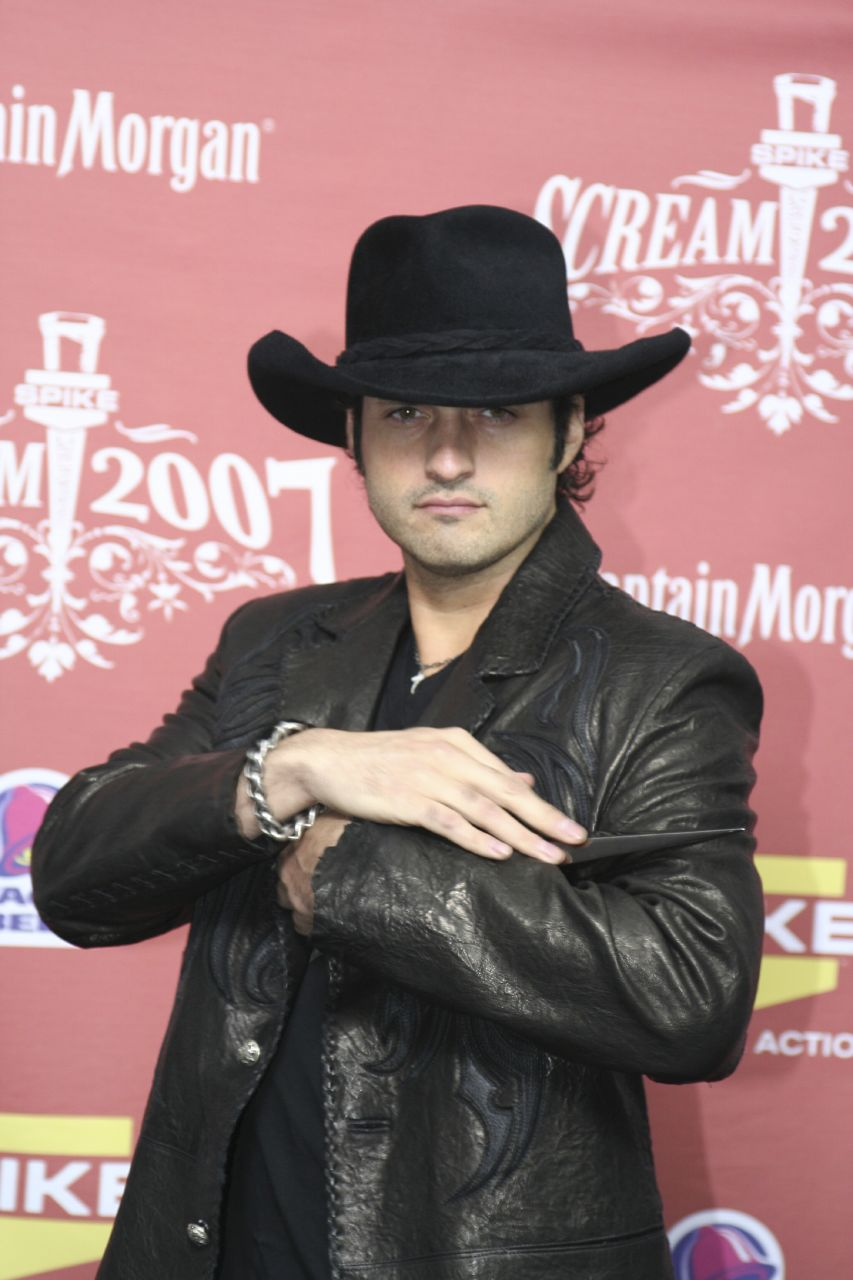
Rodriguez in 2007

Rodriguez not only has the credits of producing, directing and writing his films, he also frequently serves as editor, director of photography, camera operator, steadicam operator, composer, production designer, visual effects supervisor, and sound editor on his films. This has earned him the nickname of "the one-man film crew". He abbreviates his numerous roles in his film credits; Once Upon a Time in Mexico, for instance, is "shot, chopped, and scored by Robert Rodriguez", and Sin City is "shot and cut by Robert Rodriguez".

He calls his style of making movies "Mariachi-style" (in reference to his first feature film El Mariachi) in which (according to the back cover of his book Rebel Without a Crew) "Creativity, not money, is used to solve problems." He prefers to work at night, spending his day-time hours with his kids, when they're home, and says that he believes many creative people are "night people".

In his 2006 book The DV Rebel's Guide, Stu Maschwitz coined the term "Robert Rodriguez list", i.e. the filmmaker compiling a list of things they have access to like cool cars, apartments, horses, samurai swords and so on, and then writing the screenplay based on that list.

Rodriguez wrote a blurb for the book that stated:

I'd been wanting to write a book for the new breed of digital filmmakers, but now I don't have to. My pal and fellow movie maker Stu Maschwitz has compressed years of experience into this thorough guide. Don't make a movie without reading this book!

== Filmography ==
Directed features
Year	Title	Distributor
1992	El Mariachi	Columbia Pictures
1995	Desperado	Sony Pictures Releasing
1996	From Dusk till Dawn	Miramax Films
1998	The Faculty	Miramax Films
2001	Spy Kids	Dimension Films
2002	Spy Kids 2: The Island of Lost Dreams	Dimension Films
2003	Spy Kids 3-D: Game Over	Dimension Films
2003	Once Upon a Time in Mexico	Sony Pictures Releasing
2005	Sin City	Dimension Films
2005	The Adventures of Sharkboy and Lavagirl	Dimension Films / Sony Pictures Releasing
2007	Planet Terror	Dimension Films
2009	Shorts: The Adventures of the Wishing Rock	Warner Bros. Pictures
2010	Machete	20th Century Fox / Sony Pictures Releasing
2011	Spy Kids: All the Time in the World	The Weinstein Company
2013	Machete Kills	Open Road Films
2014	Sin City: A Dame to Kill For	The Weinstein Company
2019	Alita: Battle Angel	20th Century Fox
2019	Red 11	Double R Productions
2020	We Can Be Heroes	Netflix
2023	Hypnotic	Ketchup Entertainment / Relativity Media
2023	Spy Kids: Armageddon	Netflix

== Bibliography ==
- Rebel Without a Crew (subtitle: Or How a 23-Year-Old Filmmaker with $7,000 Became a Hollywood Player) - 1995
- RoadRacers (subtitle: The Making of a Degenerate Hot Rod Flick) - 1998

== Influences ==
Robert Rodriguez has brought a number of his favorite and most influential directors on his television show, The Director's Chair. Some of these directors included John Carpenter, Quentin Tarantino, and George Miller.

Rodriguez's favorite movie as a child was Escape to Witch Mountain, and admits that film, alongside Willy Wonka & the Chocolate Factory, Chitty Chitty Bang Bang, various James Bond films and various Ray Harryhaussen films influenced and inspired him while he was working on the Spy Kids series.

He also said to IGN that children will support anything that is empowering to them, citing Home Alone and Mighty Morphin Power Rangers, saying: "You can't understand, 'Why do you like Power Rangers?' Well, it's empowerment, and children – especially younger children – they need their mom just to go to the mall, you know? They can't drive themselves wherever they want. So when they see kids being very empowered, flying around in jet packs, being proactive, it's empowering to them".

== Collaborations ==
Rodriguez has cast certain actors in more than one of his projects. Danny Trejo has appeared in ten of his projects, while Antonio Banderas, Salma Hayek, and Cheech Marin have all appeared in seven; Alexa PenaVega has appeared in six, and Jessica Alba, Daryl Sabara, Tom Savini, and Patricia Vonne have all appeared in five.

== See also ==
- Chingon
- El Rey Network
- Dogme 95
- Robert Rodriguez's unrealized projects
