= Red 11 =

2019 film by Robert Rodriguez

- Promotional release poster
- Directed by: Robert Rodriguez
- Written by: Robert Rodriguez; Racer Rodriguez
- Based on: Rebel Without a Crew by Robert Rodriguez
- Produced by: Robert Rodriguez
- Starring: Roby Attal; Lauren Hatfield; Alejandro Rose-Garcia; Eman Esfandi; Steve Brudniak; Brently Heilbron; Pierce Foster Bailey; Katherine Willis; Ulysses Montoya; Carlos Gallardo
- Cinematography: Robert Rodriguez
- Edited by: Robert Rodriguez
- Music by: Rebel Rodriguez
- Production company: Troublemaker Studios
- Distributed by: Double R Productions
- Release dates: March 15, 2019 (SXSW); December 7, 2021 (United States)
- Running time: 77 minutes
- Country: United States
- Language: English
- Budget: $7,000

Red 11 is a 2019 American science fiction horror film produced, and directed by Robert Rodriguez. Rodriguez co-wrote the film with his son Racer Max Rodriguez, after previously collaborating on The Adventures of Sharkboy and Lavagirl in 3-D in 2005 during Racer's childhood. The film is inspired by Robert Rodriguez's experiences described in his 1995 book Rebel Without a Crew. The film stars Roby Attal, Lauren Hatfield, Alejandro Rose-Garcia, Eman Esfandi, Steve Brudniak, Brently Heilbron, Pierce Foster Bailey, Katherine Willis, Ulysses Montoya, and Carlos Gallardo.

The film had its world premiere at the 2019 SXSW festival on March 15, 2019. It also premiered at the Directors' Fortnight section at the 2019 Cannes Film Festival on May 21, 2019, the Overlook Film Festival on May 31, 2019, and the Strasbourg European Fantastic Film Festival on September 14, 2019. The film was scheduled to be released on the streaming service Tubi in 2020 in the United States, but was delayed for undisclosed reasons. The film was eventually released on December 7, 2021, simultaneously on several VOD services including iTunes and Amazon Prime.

== Plot ==
Set in a dark, twisted world of legal drug research where college kids become lab rats to make quick money, the film focuses on Rob (Roby Attal) who is trying to buy his way out of a huge debt of $7,000. Given the designation of Red 11, things get surreal when he is not sure if the hospital is really trying to kill him, or if it's side effects from the experimental drugs. Red 11 is based on director/writer Robert Rodriguez's experiences in a medical research facility to finance his first feature El Mariachi.

== Cast ==
- Roby Attal as Rob
- Lauren Hatfield as Magenta
- Alejandro Rose-Garcia as Score
- Eman Esfandi as Funny Guy
- Steve Brudniak as Head Doc
- Brently Heilbron as Doc Sock
- Pierce Foster Bailey as Spoiler
- Katherine Willis as Administrator Willis
- Ulysses Montoya as James
- Carlos Gallardo as Camacho

== Production ==
=== Development ===
Red 11 was based on Robert Rodriguez's experiences in a medical research facility to finance his first feature El Mariachi (1993); he had previously detailed this experience in his 1995 book Rebel Without a Crew.

=== Filming ===
Principal photography began on November 28, 2017, with Robert Rodriguez serving as cinematographer.

== Release ==
Red 11 had its world premiere at the 2019 SXSW festival on March 15, 2019, where it was nominated for the Adam Yauch Hörnblowér Award. It also premiered at the 2019 Cannes Film Festival on May 21, 2019, the Overlook Film Festival on May 31, 2019, and the Strasbourg European Fantastic Film Festival on September 14, 2019. The film was scheduled to be released in 2020 on the streaming service Tubi in the United States, but was delayed for undisclosed reasons. On December 7, 2021, the film was released simultaneously on several VOD services including iTunes and Amazon Prime. The docuseries Rebel Without a Crew: The Robert Rodriguez Film School was released as a companion piece alongside Red 11.

=== Reception ===
On Rotten Tomatoes, the film has an approval rating of 67% based on reviews from six critics, with an average rating of 6.2/10.

At its SXSW premiere, the film garnered mostly negative reviews. John DeFore of The Hollywood Reporter wrote that "the biggest lesson Red 11 teaches is an inadvertent one: Even a scrappy, seat-of-the-pants production needs a good script". Peter Debruge of Variety wrote that the "thriller is a clunky, badly acted, and frequently embarrassing by-the-numbers picture at best, held together with shoestring and paper clips". Griffin Shiller of The Playlist wrote that the film's "narrative is convoluted and often gets bogged down by its on-the-nose meta-commentary".
