= Carlos Gallardo (actor) =

Mexican/Irish actor and director

- Born: June 22, 1966 (age 60); Acuña, Coahuila, Mexico
- Occupations: Actor, producer, director, screenwriter
- Years active: 1985–present

Carlos Gallardo (born June 22, 1966) is a Mexican actor, producer, occasional screenwriter, and director. Gallardo frequently collaborates with his friend, director Robert Rodriguez.

== Life and career ==
Gallardo was born in Ciudad Acuña, Coahuila, Mexico, to a Mexican father and an Irish mother.

Gallardo's first success came with the feature film El Mariachi, a critically acclaimed film renowned for costing US$7,000 to make. The film won the audience award for best drama film at the 1993 Sundance Film Festival, and won Gallardo an Independent Spirit Award for Best First Feature, an accolade he shared with Rodriguez. He also was credited as unit production manager and for special effects in El Mariachi.

Following El Mariachi, Gallardo went on to be co-producer of the Robert Rodriguez-directed Mexico Trilogy sequels, Desperado and Once Upon a Time in Mexico. Both films featured Antonio Banderas in the role of El Mariachi, in place of Gallardo, though Gallardo had a minor role in Desperado, playing El Mariachi's friend, Campa.

Gallardo co-wrote, produced and starred in the title role of 2004 independent action thriller, Bandido. He was also producer for 2004 Colombian TV series Me amarás bajo la lluvia.

Carlos also participated in the Robert Rodriguez production titled Curandero where he plays the lead. Curandero was directed by Eduardo Rodriguez.

In 2007, he played Deputy Carlos in Planet Terror, Robert Rodriguez's portion of Grindhouse, appearing opposite Michael Biehn and Tom Savini. It was his first appearance in a Rodriguez film since Desperado.

== Filmography ==
| Year | Title | Role | Notes |
|---|---|---|---|
| 1985 | De veras me atrapaste | Judicial chofer | |
| 1992 | El Mariachi | El Mariachi | |
| 1995 | Desperado | Campa | |
| 1996 | Escape from L.A. | | |
| 1998 | Single Action | Amigo | |
| 1998 | Bravo | Carlos Bravo | |
| 1999 | Eastside | Luis | |
| 2004 | Me amarás bajo la lluvia | | TV series |
| 2004 | Bandido | Max Cruz | |
| 2005 | Curandero | Carlos | |
| 2007 | Grindhouse | Deputy Carlos | (segment "Planet Terror") |
| 2007 | Planet Terror | Deputy Carlos | |
| 2009 | Dead Hooker in a Trunk | God | |
| 2009 | Jazzed Up Hoodlums | Darby | |
| 2011 | The Price | Ceferino | |
| 2013 | Agent 88 | Carlos | TV Short |
| 2013 | Payday | Don Elias | Episode: "Vlad & Gage" |
| 2017 | Starwatch | Captain Roberto Sabala | |
| 2018 | Redcon-1 | SGT Frederick Reeves | |
| 2019 | Red 11 | Camacho | |
| 2023 | Where the Dead Go | Ray / Narrator | |
