= Planet Terror =

2007 film by Robert Rodriguez

- Theatrical release poster
- Directed by: Robert Rodriguez
- Written by: Robert Rodriguez
- Produced by: Elizabeth Avellán; Quentin Tarantino; Robert Rodriguez
- Starring: Rose McGowan; Freddy Rodriguez; Michael Biehn; Jeff Fahey; Josh Brolin; Marley Shelton
- Cinematography: Robert Rodriguez
- Edited by: Robert Rodriguez; Ethan Maniquis
- Music by: Robert Rodriguez
- Production companies: Rodriguez International Pictures; Troublemaker Studios
- Distributed by: Dimension Films
- Release date: April 6, 2007 (United States) (Note: Released as part of the double feature Grindhouse)
- Running time: 91 minutes (US); 105 minutes (International)
- Country: United States
- Languages: English; Spanish
- Budget: $23 million
- Box office: $11.4 million

Planet Terror is a 2007 American action zombie comedy film written and directed by Robert Rodriguez. Set in Texas, the film follows the survivors of a biochemical outbreak as they battle zombie-like creatures and a rogue military unit. It stars Rose McGowan, Freddy Rodriguez, Michael Biehn, Jeff Fahey, Josh Brolin, and Marley Shelton.

The film was originally released theatrically by Dimension Films on April 6, 2007, as part of Grindhouse, a double feature that combined Planet Terror with Quentin Tarantino's Death Proof. After Grindhouse underperformed at the domestic box office, Planet Terror was released as a standalone feature in other countries and on home media. It received positive reviews, with most critics considering it the superior of Grindhouse's two films.

== Plot ==
In rural Texas, go-go dancer Cherry Darling runs into her mysterious ex-boyfriend El Wray at the Bone Shack, a restaurant owned by brothers J.T. and Sheriff Hague. Meanwhile, the demented Lt. Muldoon and his men make a transaction with chemical engineer Abby for mass quantities of DC2, a deadly biochemical agent. When Muldoon learns that Abby has an extra supply, he attempts to take Abby hostage, causing him to release the gas into the air, mutating most of the town's residents into deformed zombie-like creatures. The infected townspeople are treated at a local hospital by Dr. William Block and his bisexual anesthesiologist wife, Dakota, who is abused by him.

Random attacks begin along the highway, causing El Wray and Cherry to crash. In the aftermath, several zombies tear off Cherry's right leg. At the hospital is Tammy, the former lover of Dakota, who Block recognizes. Upon realizing Dakota was about to leave him for Tammy, he stabs Dakota's hands with her anesthetic syringe needles repeatedly, rendering them useless, before locking her in a supply closet.

El Wray is detained by Sheriff Hague based on past encounters between the two. As the patients mutate, El Wray leaves the station and arrives at the hospital, attaching a wooden table leg to Cherry's stump. As El Wray and Cherry fight their way out of the hospital, Dakota manages to escape in her car. Meanwhile, Block becomes infected along with others, while Cherry and El Wray take refuge at the Bone Shack.

Dakota retrieves her son Tony and takes him to her estranged father, Texas Ranger Earl McGraw. Tony accidentally shoots himself while waiting in the car. (Following a "missing reel" segment) Dakota, Earl, Cherry's former boss Skip, and Tony's crazed babysitter twins arrive at the Bone Shack. With Hague badly injured, the group decides to flee to the Mexican border, before being stopped by a large mass of zombies. Muldoon's men arrive, killing the zombies before arresting the group. Abby tells them that the soldiers are stealing the gas supply because they are infected and constant inhalation of the gas delays mutation. They also learn that some of the population is immune, hinting at the possibility of a cure.

As Cherry and Dakota are taken away by two soldiers, the others defeat the guards. J.T. sustains a gunshot wound in the process while the group searches for Muldoon. When he is found by El Wray and Abby, Muldoon explains that he killed Osama bin Laden before he and his men were infected and were ordered to protect the area before being killed by Abby and El Wray. Meanwhile, Cherry is held at gunpoint and forced to dance by a soldier who threatens to rape her. Eventually, she breaks her wooden leg across his face and stabs him in the eye. Dakota, after realizing that her hands have regained feeling, uses her syringe launcher to subdue another soldier. El Wray and Abby arrive to rescue Cherry and Dakota; El Wray replaces Cherry's broken wooden leg with an assault rifle and grenade launcher.

J.T. decides to stay behind to detonate explosives to eliminate the remaining zombies while the others flee. The survivors make plans to escape by stealing helicopters after fighting through a large group of zombies, but Abby gets his head blown apart by a ballistic missile in the process. An infected Block attacks Dakota but is shot dead by Earl. While saving Cherry from a zombie, El Wray is fatally wounded. Cherry, now sporting a minigun leg, leads survivors to the Caribbean beach at Tulum, where they start a peaceful new society during a worldwide zombie outbreak. It is also revealed that Cherry has given birth to her and El Wray's daughter.

In a post-credits scene, Tony is sitting on the beach at the survivor's "base" playing with his turtle, scorpion, and tarantula.

== Cast ==
- Rose McGowan as Cherry Darling
- Freddy Rodriguez as "El Wray"
- Josh Brolin as Dr. William Block
- Marley Shelton as Dr. Dakota Block
- Jeff Fahey as J.T. Hague
- Michael Biehn as Sheriff Hague
- Rebel Rodriguez as Tony Block
- Bruce Willis as Lieutenant Muldoon
- Naveen Andrews as Dr. John "Abby" Abbington
- Julio Oscar Mechoso as Romy
- Fergie as Tammy Visan (credited as "Stacy Ferguson")
- Nicky Katt as Joe
- Hung Nguyen as Dr. Crane
- Tom Savini as Deputy Tolo
- Carlos Gallardo as Deputy Carlos
- Skip Reissig as Skip
- Electra and Elise Avellan as Crazy Babysitter Twins
- Quentin Tarantino as Lewis, Rapist #1
- Greg Kelly as Rapist #2
- Michael Parks as Earl McGraw
- Jerili Romeo as Ramona McGraw
- Felix Sabates as Dr. Felix

== History and development ==
Robert Rodriguez first came up with the idea for Planet Terror during the production of The Faculty. "I remember telling Elijah Wood and Josh Hartnett, all these young actors, that zombie movies were dead and hadn't been around in a while, but that I thought they were going to come back in a big way because they’d been gone for so long," recalled Rodriguez, "I said, 'We've got to be there first.' I had [a script] I’d started writing. It was about 30 pages, and I said to them, 'There are characters for all of you to play.' We got all excited about it, and then I didn't know where to go with it. The introduction was about as far as I'd gotten, and then I got onto other movies. Sure enough, the zombie [movie] invasion happened and they all came back again, and I was like, 'Ah, I knew that I should've made my zombie film.'" The story was reapproached when the idea for Grindhouse was developed by Rodriguez and Quentin Tarantino.

Planet Terror is preceded by a fake trailer for a film titled Machete, starring Danny Trejo and Cheech Marin, as it had during the original "double feature" presentation of Grindhouse. Rodriguez wrote Machete in 1993 as a full feature for Danny Trejo. "I had cast him in Desperado and I remember thinking, 'Wow, this guy should have his own series of Mexican exploitation movies like Charles Bronson or like Jean-Claude Van Damme.' So I wrote him this idea of a federale from Mexico who gets hired to do hatchet jobs in the U.S. I had heard sometimes FBI or DEA have a really tough job that they don't want to get their own agents killed on, they'll hire an agent from Mexico to come do the job for $25,000. I thought, 'That's Machete. He would come and do a really dangerous job for a lot of money to him but for everyone else over here it's peanuts.' But I never got around to making it." It was later announced that the trailer would be made as a feature film Machete. As for the reference to "Planet Terror," Rodriguez paid homage to the late night horror show "Project Terror" which aired in Rodriguez's hometown of San Antonio, Texas on KENS-TV during the 1970s and early 1980s.

== Production ==
=== Directing ===
According to actress Marley Shelton, Robert Rodriguez and Quentin Tarantino "really co-directed, at least Planet Terror. Quentin was on set a lot. He had notes and adjustments to our performances and he changed lines every once in a while. Of course, he always deferred to Robert on Planet Terror and vice versa for Death Proof. So it's really both of their brainchild." Tarantino has stated, "I can't imagine doing Grindhouse with any other director in the way me and Robert did it because I just had complete faith and trust in him. So much so that we didn't actually see each other's movie completed until three weeks before the film opened. It was as if we worked in little vacuums and cut our movies down, and then put them together and watched it all play, and then made a couple of little changes after that, and pretty much that was it." Rodriguez acted as cinematographer on Planet Terror, as he had done on some of his earlier films.

=== Casting ===
Many of the cast members had previously worked with Rodriguez. Before appearing in Grindhouse, Marley Shelton had auditioned for The Faculty, but Rodriguez chose not to cast her. She was eventually cast in the role of the Customer in the opening sequence of Sin City. Bruce Willis had appeared in Sin City. Tom Savini had previously acted in From Dusk till Dawn, Michael Parks reprises the role of Earl McGraw, a role the actor first portrayed in From Dusk till Dawn, and Quentin Tarantino himself appears in a small role, as he also does in Death Proof. Harvey Weinstein did not want Rose McGowan to be cast in the film, after he allegedly sexually assaulted her years earlier and then blacklisted her from being in any Miramax-related movies. Robert Rodriguez was dating McGowan and cast her knowing that it would enrage Weinstein, though Rodriguez later said that Harvey deliberately slashed the ad budget for the film in an effort to hurt it at the box office. McGowan accused Rodriguez of exploiting her, but Rodriguez noted that she signed on to the script that was filmed, and that sequences where McGowan's character was threatened with sexual assault were there to then set up her attacking and killing predatory men.

=== Special effects ===
The film uses various unconventional techniques to make Planet Terror appear more like the films that were shown in grindhouse theaters in the 1970s. Throughout the feature and the Machete trailer, the film is made to look damaged; five of the six 25,000 frame reels were edited with real film damage, plug-ins, and stock footage.

Planet Terror makes heavy use of digital effects throughout the film, mostly for Cherry's fake leg. During post-production, the effects teams digitally removed McGowan's right leg from the shots and replaced it with computer-generated props—first a table leg and then an assault rifle. During shooting for these scenes, McGowan wore a special cast which restricted her leg movement to give her the correct motion.

=== Editing ===
During pre-production, Tarantino and Rodriguez came up with the idea of inserting a "missing reel" into the film. "[Quentin] was about to show an Italian crime movie with Oliver Reed," Rodriguez recalls, "and he was saying, 'Oh, it's got a missing reel in it. But it's really interesting because after the missing reel, you don't know if he slept with a girl or he didn't because she says he did and he says that he didn't. It leaves you guessing, and the movie still works with 20 minutes gone out of it.' I thought, 'Oh, my God, that's what we’ve got to do. We've got to have a missing reel!' I'm going to use it in a way where it actually says 'missing reel' for 10 seconds, and then when we come back, you're arriving in the third act. ... The late second acts in movies are usually the most predictable and the most boring, that's where the good guy really turns out to be the bad guy, and the bad guy is really good, and the couple becomes friends. Suddenly, though, in the third act, all bets are off and it's a whole new story anyway."

=== Music ===
The music for Planet Terror was composed by Robert Rodriguez. Inspiration for his score came from John Carpenter, whose music was often played on set. A cover version of the Dead Kennedys' "Too Drunk to Fuck" performed by Nouvelle Vague was also featured in the film. A soundtrack album was released on April 3, 2007, alongside the soundtrack for Death Proof.

== Theatrical release ==
Planet Terror was released in the United States and Canada alongside Death Proof as part of a double feature under the title Grindhouse. Both films were released separately in extended versions internationally, approximately two months apart. The Dutch poster artwork for Planet Terror claimed that the film would feature "coming attractions" from Quentin Tarantino. In the United Kingdom, Planet Terror was released in cinemas on November 9, 2007. In reaction to the possibility of a split in a foreign release, Tarantino stated, "Especially if they were dealing with non-English language countries, they don't really have this tradition ... not only do they not really know what a grind house is, they don't even have the double feature tradition. So you are kind of trying to teach us something else."

== Alternative versions ==
With the exception of Grindhouse and Single Theatrical versions of the movie, Rodriguez shot an alternative version where Tony Block did not accidentally shoot himself and survives throughout the film. The official theatrical version features a snippet of Tony on the beach after the end credits and snippets of scenes from this version appears on Rodriguez's 10 Minute Film School feature on Planet Terror DVD. Rodriguez mentioned that this version is especially made for his son Rebel, and has shown Rebel the film with the happy ending rather than the version where he is dead. He also mentioned that Tony's death makes his "horror film... more horrifying in his way".

== Home media ==
Planet Terror was released on DVD on October 16, 2007, in a two-disc special edition featuring the extended version of the film presented in a "flat" 1.78:1 screen ratio (the theatrical version in Grindhouse was matted to 2.35:1), audio commentary with Rodriguez, an audience reaction track, several behind the scenes featurettes about casting and special effects, and a "10 Minute Film School" segment, in which Rodriguez confirmed that a box set of the two films would be available soon, and that his 10 Minute Cooking School on Texas BBQ would appear on it.

The film was released on Blu-ray on December 16, 2008. This version ports over the features from the DVD special edition, and also includes a "scratch-free" version of the movie, which does not feature the aforementioned intentional "damaged" look to the print. However, all American home video releases of the film are the extended version only and do not include the theatrical cut.

In mid-February 2009, Germany also released a steel box collector's edition for Planet Terror which comes with the famous BBQ sauce recipe and two scratch-and-sniff discs of the film which smell like the BBQ sauce. The pack also contains a limited edition Planet Terror blood pack.

The Grindhouse double feature was released on Blu-ray Disc in October 2010.

== Critical reception ==
Planet Terror is rated 77% on the review aggregation website Rotten Tomatoes based on 30 reviews. The site's critics consensus reads, "A cool and hip grindhouse throwback, Planet Terror is an unpredictable zombie thrillride." Rotten Tomatoes lists the film on its 100 Best Zombie Movies, Ranked by Tomatometer.

== See also ==
- List of films featuring fictional films
