= Marintia Escobedo =

Mexican actress

Marintia Escobedo Santibáñez is a Mexican television personality and actress.

== Telenovelas ==
- Vivan Los Niños (2002) Amelia
- Mi Camino Es Amarte (2022) Lic. Roberta
- Sabor A Ti (2026) Eloisa

== Unitarios ==
- La Rosa De Guadalupe (2023)...Leonor
- Como dice el dicho (2020)...Sandra
- Como dice el dicho (2019)...Alberta
- Como dice el dicho (2018)...Anisha
- Como dice el dicho (2017)...Marisa

== Realities Show ==
- Big Brother Vip (2003) Primera Expulsada

== Cine ==
- Elisa antes del fin del mundo

== Conducción ==
- Netas Divinas (2026) Conductora Invitada
- Programa Hoy (2018)
- El terreno de Eva (2003)
- Projection 2000
- 24 horas
- Noticias Eco
- En Vivo
