= Rebel Without a Crew =

1995 non-fiction book by Robert Rodriguez

- US first-edition cover
- Author: Robert Rodriguez
- Genre: Movie direction and production
- Published: 1995
- Publisher: Plume
- Publication place: United States
- Media type: Paperback
- Pages: 285
- ISBN: 978-0452271876

Rebel Without a Crew (subtitle: Or How a 23-Year-Old Filmmaker with $7,000 Became a Hollywood Player) is a 1995 non-fiction book by Robert Rodriguez. The book chronicles the origin, production and eventual success of Rodriguez's debut feature, a 1992 crime thriller called El Mariachi.

Later editions of the book also feature one of Rodriguez's tutorials on low-budget filmmaking (Ten Minute Film School) and the screenplay to El Mariachi.

== Influence ==
Considered one of the best books on filmmaking and is considered an inspiration to many independent filmmakers.

== Film adaptation ==
A section of the book was loosely adapted by Rodriguez himself as the 2019 film Red 11.
