= Peter Marquardt =

American actor

- Born: July 1, 1964
- Died: July 19, 2014 (aged 50); Austin, Texas, United States
- Occupations: Actor, producer
- Years active: 1992–2011
- Known for: El Mariachi

Peter Charles Marquardt (July 1, 1964 – July 19, 2014) was an American actor and video game producer.

He was best known for his debut film role as the drug lord Moco (Spanish for "booger") in Robert Rodriguez's 1992 action film El Mariachi. He landed the role following a chance encounter with Rodriguez at a research facility, where both men were volunteering as test subjects for cholesterol-lowering medication. Rodriguez cast Marquardt in the Spanish-language El Mariachi despite the fact that Marquardt did not speak Spanish.

Marquardt reprised the role of Moco for a flashback sequence in Rodriguez's next film, Desperado. He later appeared in Rodriguez's Spy Kids 3-D: Game Over and starred in the 2011 horror-thriller The Shadow People.

Outside of film acting, Marquardt was an associate producer on several video games for Ion Storm, including Deus Ex and Wing Commander IV: The Price of Freedom. He also co-produced Dominion: Storm Over Gift 3.

Marquardt died in Austin, Texas on July 19, 2014, at the age of 50.

== Filmography ==
Year	Title	Role	Notes
1992	El Mariachi	Mauricio "Moco"	
1995	Desperado	Mauricio "Moco"	
2003	Spy Kids 3-D: Game Over	OSS Agent #2	
2011	The Shadow People	Dr. Ezekiel Narticus	Final acting role
