= Once Upon a Time in Mexico =

2003 film by Robert Rodriguez

- Theatrical release poster
- Directed by: Robert Rodriguez
- Written by: Robert Rodriguez
- Produced by: Elizabeth Avellán; Carlos Gallardo; Robert Rodriguez
- Starring: Antonio Banderas; Salma Hayek; Johnny Depp; Mickey Rourke; Eva Mendes; Danny Trejo; Enrique Iglesias; Marco Leonardi; Cheech Marin; Rubén Blades; Willem Dafoe
- Cinematography: Robert Rodriguez
- Edited by: Robert Rodriguez
- Music by: Robert Rodriguez
- Production companies: Columbia Pictures; Dimension Films; Troublemaker Studios
- Distributed by: Sony Pictures Releasing (Note: Split distribution between Sony Pictures and Miramax International. Sony handled distribution in North America, India, Japan and home media worldwide, while Miramax handled theatrical distribution outside those territories through Buena Vista International.)
- Release date: September 12, 2003
- Running time: 102 minutes
- Country: United States
- Languages: English; Spanish
- Budget: $29 million
- Box office: $98.8 million

Once Upon a Time in Mexico is a 2003 American neo-Western action film written, directed, produced, photographed, scored, and edited by Robert Rodriguez. It is the sequel to Desperado (1995) and the third and final installment in the Mexico Trilogy. The film features Antonio Banderas in his second and final performance as El Mariachi. In the film, El Mariachi is recruited by CIA agent Sheldon Sands (Johnny Depp) to kill a corrupt general responsible for the death of his wife, Carolina (Salma Hayek).

Once Upon a Time in Mexico was produced by Columbia Pictures, Dimension Films and Troublemaker Studios and released in the United States on September 12, 2003, by Sony Pictures Releasing. The film received mixed reviews from critics, with praise for Depp's performance, but criticism for reducing its protagonist to an almost secondary character in his own trilogy and a convoluted plot. In the special features of the film's DVD, Rodriguez explained this was intentional, as he wanted this to be his The Good, the Bad and the Ugly of the trilogy. It grossed over $98 million against a $29 million production budget.

== Plot ==
El Mariachi is recruited by CIA officer Sheldon Jeffrey Sands to kill General Emiliano Marquez, a corrupt Mexican Army officer who has been hired by Mexican drug lord Armando Barillo to assassinate the President of Mexico and overthrow the government during a period of unrest in Culiacán (the capital of Sinaloa) testing the presidency. Many years before, El Mariachi and his wife Carolina confronted Marquez in a shootout and wounded the general; in retaliation, Marquez took the lives of Carolina and their daughter in an ambush. In addition to El Mariachi, Sands persuades former FBI agent Jorge Ramírez to come out of retirement and kill Barillo, who had murdered his partner Archuleta in the past. Furthermore, AFN operative Ajedrez is assigned by Sands to tail Barillo.

While monitoring Barillo's activities, Ramírez meets Billy Chambers, an American fugitive who has been living under the protection of Barillo, but can no longer stomach the horrible tasks he's been forced to carry out for him. Ramírez convinces Chambers he will provide him protection in exchange for getting closer to Barillo by tagging Chambers's pet chihuahua with a hidden microphone, and Chambers agrees to complete the deal by surrendering to U.S. authorities once Barillo has been taken down. Sands's agent, Cucuy, originally hired to keep an eye on El Mariachi, instead turns and tranquilizes El Mariachi and turns him over to Barillo, also offering to reveal the details of Sands's plan. Cucuy, however, is promptly killed by Chambers while El Mariachi escapes from captivity and calls his friends Lorenzo and Fideo to assist him in his mission.

While monitoring Barillo's activity outside a hospital, Ramírez notices armed men storming the building and follows suit. He discovers that a group of doctors has been gunned down and Barillo has bled to death as a result of a botched facial reconstruction but realizes that the corpse on the operating table is a body double before he is knocked out and kidnapped by the real Barillo and Ajedrez, who reveals herself to be Barillo's daughter. Sands realizes that his mission has been compromised but is too late, as he is captured by Barillo and Ajedrez — who drill out his eyes before sending him out. Despite his blindness, he manages to gun down a hitman tailing him with the aid of a chicle boy.

As Culiacán celebrates the Day of the Dead during the President's visit, Marquez and his army storm in and attack the presidential palace. Marquez's troops, however, are met with resistance from not only the President's bodyguards but also the citizens of Culiacán and the Mariachis. Sands had instructed El Mariachi to allow the President to be killed before attacking Marquez, but the Mariachis, concluding that the President is a good man, intervene early and protect him. Marquez enters the presidential palace, only to once again confront El Mariachi, who shoots out his kneecaps before killing him with a headshot. Ramírez, who was released from captivity by Chambers, faces Barillo. After Barillo guns down Chambers, Ramírez and El Mariachi kill the drug lord. Sands manages to shoot the sadistic Ajedrez dead outside the presidential palace. Ultimately, Lorenzo and Fideo walk away with the cash that Barillo was using to pay Marquez and help the president safely escape the attempted coup. Ramírez says goodbye to Sands and walks away, having avenged his partner's death. El Mariachi then gives his share of the cash to his home village before walking into the sunset.

== Cast ==
- Antonio Banderas as "El Mariachi"
- Salma Hayek as Carolina
- Johnny Depp as CIA Agent Sands
- Mickey Rourke as Billy Chambers
- Eva Mendes as Ajedrez
- Danny Trejo as "El Cucuy"
- Enrique Iglesias as Lorenzo
- Marco Leonardi as Fideo
- Cheech Marin as Belini
- Julio Oscar Mechoso as Nicholas, Presidential Advisor
- Rubén Blades as Jorge Ramirez
- Willem Dafoe as Armando Barillo
- Pedro Armendáriz, Jr. as President
- Tony Valdes as Chicle Boy
- Gerardo Vigil as General Emiliano Marquez
- Miguel Couturier as Dr. Guevera

=== Characterizations ===
In a 2003 issue of Rolling Stone, Depp was named as one of its "People of the Year", and gave an interview in which he briefly discussed his role as Sands:

The idea behind him is there was this guy I used to know in Hollywood, in the business, who on the outside was very charming – soft-spoken and almost hypnotic in the rhythm he used to speak. He refused to call me Johnny – always called me John. You knew this guy was aiming to fuck you over, but somehow you stuck around because he was just so fascinating to watch.

Depp also said in an Entertainment Weekly article that he "imagine[d] this guy wore really cheesy tourist shirts", that he had a "sideline obsession with Broadway", and that he favored strange, obvious disguises; all three qualities can be observed in the film. It was also revealed in the director's commentary on the DVD that Depp himself came up with the character's first and middle names.

The name of Jorge Ramirez's murdered partner, Agent Armando Archuleta, is likely an allusion to Detective Danny Archuleta, a character from Predator 2 that was also portrayed by Rubén Blades.

== Production ==
Made on a US$29 million budget, the film was shot in May 2001 before Spy Kids 2: The Island of Lost Dreams (2002) and Spy Kids 3-D: Game Over (2003) in order to avoid a potential Screen Actors Guild strike. Shooting took place over seven weeks in Querétaro, San Miguel de Allende and Guanajuato, Mexico. It was the first big-budget film to be shot in high-definition digital video. Robert Rodriguez chose to shoot on digital after George Lucas, who was shooting Star Wars: Episode II – Attack of the Clones (2002), showed him early footage shot digitally. Impressed, Rodriguez chose to shoot digitally, but he knew he did not have enough time to shoot Spy Kids 2. Instead, he pitched a sequel to Desperado (1995) to Miramax Films and wrote a script in six days. The initial draft was 65 pages long, which he padded with a subplot borrowed from an unproduced short film. When Miramax Films expressed hesitation over the added subplot, he readily removed it. His primary influence was Sergio Leone's Dollars Trilogy, specifically The Good, The Bad, and The Ugly (1966). Rodriguez said shooting digitally saved time and money, simplified the filming process, and rendered 35 mm film obsolete for him.

== Music ==
=== Soundtrack ===
Original Motion Picture Soundtrack: Once Upon a Time in Mexico

Soundtrack album by Various artists
- Released: September 2003
- Genres: Latin rock; rockabilly; hard rock; film score
- Length: 51:44
- Languages: English; Spanish
- Label: Milan Records
- Producer: Robert Rodriguez

Professional ratings
Review scores
| Source | Rating |
|---|---|
| AllMusic | link |

The film's score includes songs composed by Rodriguez, and performed by a group of musicians gathered specifically for the soundtrack recording. Tracks performed by the group include "Malagueña" with guitar by Brian Setzer, and "Siente Mi Amor", with singing by Salma Hayek. Track 9, "Sands Theme", credited to "Tonto's Giant Nuts", was written by Johnny Depp. Additional music includes Juno Reactor's "Pistolero", "Me Gustas Tú" by Manu Chao, and "Cuka Rocka" by Rodriguez' own rock band, Chingon. On the DVD director commentary, Rodriguez states that he requested that each of the main actors give him four or eight notes of a melody for their character, but Depp presented him with the entire track.

=== Track listing ===
| No. | Title | Writer(s) | Artist(s) | Length |
|---|---|---|---|---|
| 1. | "Malagueña" | Traditional | Brian Setzer | 4:22 |
| 2. | "Traeme Paz" | Israel Rodriguez; Patricia Vonne | Patricia Vonne | 2:56 |
| 3. | "Eye Patch" | Robert Rodriguez | Robert Rodriguez feat. Alex Ruiz | 1:51 |
| 4. | "Yo Te Quiero" | Marcos Loya | Marcos Loya | 3:48 |
| 5. | "Guitar Town" | Rodriguez | Robert Rodriguez | 2:04 |
| 6. | "Church Shootout" | Rodriguez | Robert Rodriguez | 1:38 |
| 7. | "Pistolero" | Ben Watkins; Steve Stevens | Juno Reactor | 3:38 |
| 8. | "Me Gustas Tú" | Manu Chao | Manu Chao | 3:49 |
| 9. | "Sands Theme" | Johnny Depp; Bill Carter; Bruce Witkin; Ruth Ellsworth | Tonto's Giant Nuts | 3:24 |
| 10. | "Dias de Los Angeles" | Ruiz; Mark del Castillo | Del Castillo | 5:08 |
| 11. | "The Man with No Eyes" | Rodriguez | Robert Rodriguez | 2:09 |
| 12. | "Mariachi vs. Marquez" | Rodriguez | Robert Rodriguez | 1:33 |
| 13. | "Flor del Mal" | Tito Larriva; Steven Hufsteter | Tito Larriva & Steven Hufsteter | 3:13 |
| 14. | "Chicle Boy" | Rodriguez | Robert Rodriguez | 1:30 |
| 15. | "Coup de Etat" | Rodriguez | Robert Rodriguez | 3:02 |
| 16. | "El Mariachi" | Rodriguez | Robert Rodriguez | 1:22 |
| 17. | "Siente Mi Amor" | Jose Tamez; Rodriguez | Salma Hayek | 4:24 |
| 18. | "Cuka Rocka" | Traditional | Chingon | 1:44 |
| Total length: | | | | 51:44 |

== Reception ==
=== Box office ===
Once Upon a Time in Mexico was released in the United States on September 12, 2003, by Sony Pictures Releasing through Columbia Pictures, and internationally by Miramax International through Buena Vista International, in 3,282 theaters with an opening weekend gross of US$23.4 million. It went on to make $56.4 million in North America and $41.8 in the rest of the world for a combined total of $98.2 million on a $29 million budget.

=== Critical response ===
On Rotten Tomatoes, Once Upon a Time in Mexico holds an approval rating of 66% based on 167 reviews, with an average rating of 6.20/10. The site's critics consensus reads: "Violent, pulpy, loopy fun, with Depp stealing the show." On Metacritic, the film has a weighted average score of 56 out of 100 based on 34 critics, indicating "mixed or average reviews" . Audiences surveyed by CinemaScore gave the film an average grade of "B−" on an A+ to F scale.

Chicago Sun-Times film critic Roger Ebert gave the film three out of four stars and wrote, "Like Leone's movie, the Rodriguez epic is more interested in the moment, in great shots, in surprises and ironic reversals and closeups of sweaty faces, than in a coherent story." A. O. Scott wrote in his review for The New York Times, "But in the end, the punched-up editing and vibrant color schemes start to grow tiresome, and Mr. Rodriguez, bored with his own gimmickry and completely out of ideas, responds by pushing the violence to needlessly grotesque extremes."

In her review for USA Today, Claudia Puig wrote, "In Mexico, Rodriguez has fashioned a swaggering fantasy that pays homage to spaghetti Westerns such as Sergio Leone's The Good, the Bad and the Ugly. Plenty of blood is shed, much powerful artillery is fired, and action sequences provide astounding car crashes and fiery explosions." Writing for Entertainment Weekly, Owen Gleiberman gave the film a "B" rating and praised Depp's performance with its "winking grace notes of Brandoesque flakery ... is as minimal and laid-back as his Pirates of the Caribbean turn was deep-dish theatrical".

== Television series ==
Sony's AXN channel confirmed that it will be airing a TV series adaptation of the Mexico Trilogy. The series, entitled El Mariachi, premiered on March 20, 2014.

== See also ==
- Livin' la Vida Loca
