= El Mariachi =

1993 film by Robert Rodriguez

- Theatrical release poster
- Directed by: Robert Rodriguez
- Written by: Robert Rodriguez
- Produced by: Robert Rodriguez; Carlos Gallardo
- Starring: Carlos Gallardo; Consuelo Gómez; Peter Marquardt
- Cinematography: Robert Rodriguez
- Edited by: Robert Rodriguez
- Music by: Eric Guthrie; Chris Knudson; Álvaro Rodriguez; Cecilio Rodriguez; Mark Trujillo
- Production company: Los Hooligans Productions
- Distributed by: Columbia Pictures
- Release dates: September 15, 1992 (TIFF); January 8, 1993 (Sundance); February 26, 1993 (United States)
- Running time: 81 minutes
- Country: United States
- Language: Spanish
- Budget: Production: $7,225; Post-production: $200,000
- Box office: $2 million

El Mariachi (transl. The Musician) is a 1992 Spanish-language American independent neo-Western action film and the first installment of the saga that came to be known as Robert Rodriguez's Mexico Trilogy. It marked the feature-length debut of Rodriguez as writer and director. The film was shot with a mainly amateur cast in the northern Mexican border town of Ciudad Acuña, Coahuila, Mexico across from Del Rio, Texas, the home town of leading actor Carlos Gallardo as the title character, an aspiring musician being mistaken for a recently escaped convict. The US$7,225 production was originally intended for the Mexican home-video market, but executives at Columbia Pictures liked the film and bought the American distribution rights. Columbia eventually spent $200,000 to transfer the print to film, to remix the sound, and on other post-production work, then spent millions more on marketing and distribution.

The success of Rodriguez's directorial debut led him to create two sequels (Desperado and Once Upon a Time in Mexico) with Antonio Banderas taking over from Gallardo for the character, though Gallardo co-produced both films and had a minor role in Desperado.

The film received positive reviews from critics. In 2011, El Mariachi was selected by the Library of Congress for preservation in the United States National Film Registry for being "culturally, historically, or aesthetically significant". The film is also recognized by Guinness World Records as the lowest-budgeted film ever to gross $1 million at the box office.

== Plot ==
After breaking out of jail in a small town outside Jiménez, Coahuila, Mexico, a ruthless criminal, nicknamed Azul, ventures off with a guitar case full of weapons and vows revenge on the local drug lord, Moco, his former comrade who betrayed him and had him arrested. Meanwhile, a wandering young musician arrives in the town of Acuña carrying his own guitar case which contains his signature guitar. He hopes to find work there and ultimately achieve his dream of becoming an esteemed mariachi like his father and grandfather.

From the confines of his heavily guarded villa on the outskirts of town, Moco dispatches a legion of Sicarios led by his assistant Bigotón to kill Azul. Because the Mariachi also matches Moco's description of a man dressed in black with a guitar case, the hitmen misidentify him as Azul. Having rented a cheap room at a local motel, the Mariachi escapes into the streets, where he is forced to kill four of the attackers in self-defense. As he seeks refuge in a bar owned by a beautiful woman named Dominó, he explains that he has recently arrived and must lay low until the crisis subsides; she sympathetically conceals him in an upstairs room. Unfortunately, Moco is not only financing the bar, but is also romancing Dominó.

Bigotón arrives at the bar a short time later and telephones Moco about an escaped killer dressed in black and carrying a guitar case containing weapons. Once he departs, Dominó, having overheard the conversation, ventures upstairs to the Mariachi's room and holds her letter-opener against his throat, demanding that he open his case; revealing his guitar, he successfully convinces her of his innocence via song, after which she agrees to house him in exchange for his singing services. Following his successful first performance at the bar that night, the Mariachi quickly commences a romantic relationship with Dominó.

The following morning, he returns to the motel, intending to retrieve his deposit money. When Azul visits the bar for a beer and information about Moco, he accidentally departs with the Mariachi's guitar case. Three of Moco's thugs ambush him but release him upon discovering that the case he is carrying contains only a guitar. Returning to the bar, the Mariachi realizes what has happened and rushes outside to locate Azul. Confused, Moco's men disperse and pursue both Azul and the Mariachi; the latter uses Azul's weapons to kill several more men. Returning to his hideout, Azul orders two of his friends to retrieve his personal guitar case. That night, Dominó describes her complicated romantic relationship with Moco, who also financed her spacious apartment; the following morning, she lends the Mariachi money for a new guitar so he can continue performing for customers. While he is surveying a shop window, he is incapacitated by Bigotón, who delivers him to Moco; the kingpin identifies the Mariachi as the wrong man and sets him free.

Meanwhile, Azul returns to Dominó's bar demanding his guitar case and orders her to take him to Moco, or Moco will kill the Mariachi; she agrees to cooperate to save the Mariachi's life. When they arrive at Moco's gated compound, Azul pretends to take her hostage in order to gain entry. Moco soon realizes that she has fallen for the Mariachi and jealously shoots both her and Azul dead. Suddenly, the Mariachi, having regained consciousness, arrives on Dominó's motorcycle to find her gunned down in the courtyard. Furious at him for murdering his minions and stealing his girlfriend, Moco shoots the Mariachi's left hand, effectively rendering him useless as a guitarist, and proceeds to tauntingly laugh at him. Overcome with grief and rage, the Mariachi grabs Azul's gun with his right hand and kills Moco, avenging Dominó's death. Moco's surviving henchmen, seeing their leader dead, walk off unconcerned and leave Moco's body and the wounded Mariachi behind, as Moco had consistently disrespected them.

With his dreams of becoming a mariachi having been shattered, and Azul's former weapons, which he has stored in the guitar case, providing the only protection for his future, the Mariachi mounts Dominó's motorcycle, taking her pit bull and her letter-opener as mementos of her, and departs Acuña, riding into the sunset.

== Cast ==
- Carlos Gallardo as "El Mariachi"
- Consuelo Gómez as Dominó
- Peter Marquardt as Mauricio "Moco"
- Reinol Martínez as "Azul"
- Jaime de Hoyos as "Bigotón"
- Ramiro Gómez as The Waiter
- Jesús López Viejo as The Clerk
- Luis Baro as Dominó's Assistant
- Óscar Fabila as The Boy

== Production ==
The film was shot in numerous locations in Ciudad Acuña, Coahuila, located in Northeastern Mexico adjacent to Del Rio, Texas. The film used 16 mm film and was shot in 14 days. Rodriguez had a $7,000 budget (equivalent to $16,547 in 2025), almost half of which he raised by participating in experimental clinical drug testing while living in Austin, Texas. The opening scenes, featuring a shootout in a jail, were filmed at the local Acuña jail situated on the outskirts of the town. The female warden and the male guard were the real-life warden and guard; Rodriguez thought it was convenient because it saved him the cost of hiring actors and renting clothing. The intro bar scene was shot inside the Corona Club and exterior street scenes were shot on Hidalgo Street. The shootout was filmed outside at "Boy's Town", the local red-light district.

Not everyone in Acuña was pleased with the filming. Local journalists Ramiro Gómez and Jesús López Viejo were especially critical of the filming, and to win them over, Rodriguez gave them small parts in the film. Due to the high body count of the film, Rodriguez increasingly had difficulties finding adult men to play thugs, as dead characters obviously could not return; for that reason, when the Mariachi meets Moco's gang at the end of the film, the gang consists mainly of teenagers.

On the El Mariachi DVD, Rodriguez devotes both a DVD commentary and an "Extras" section to explaining the tricks of filming a feature-length film with just $7,000. Rodriguez heavily stresses the need for cost cutting, "because if you start to spend, you cannot stop anymore." This is why he cut costs at every possible opportunity. He did not use a slate; the actors, instead, signaled the number of scene and number of take with their fingers. He did not use a dolly, and instead held the camera while being pushed around in a wheelchair. He did not use synchronised sound; rather, he shot the film silent, then recorded on-set audio so it could be synced in post-production. Professional lighting was replaced by two 200-watt clip-on desk lamps. No film crew was hired; actors not in the scenes helped out instead. Rodriguez believed in filming scenes sequentially in one long take with a single camera; every few seconds, he froze the action, so he could change the camera angle and make it appear that he used multiple cameras simultaneously. Bloopers were kept in to save film: Rodriguez is visible on a bus with the Mariachi; the Mariachi bumps his weapon into a street pole; he fails to throw his guitar case on a balcony; and Dominó twitches her face when she is already dead. Rodriguez spared expense by shooting on 16 mm film as opposed to 35 mm, and transferred the film to 3/4-inch video for offline editing, avoiding the costs of cutting on film. In the end, he used only 24 rolls of film and only spent $7,225 of the $9,000 he had planned.

Rodriguez gave insight into his low budget approach to simulate machine gun fire. The problem was that when using real guns, as opposed to the specially designed blank firing firearms used in most films, the blanks would jam the weapon after being fired once. To solve this, Rodriguez filmed the firing of one blank from different angles, dubbed canned machine gun sounds over it, and had the actors drop bullet shells to the ground to make it look like as if multiple rounds had been shot. In addition, he occasionally used water guns instead of real guns to save money. The squibs used in shootout scenes were simply condoms filled with fake blood and fixed over weightlifting belts.

Several aspects of the film were improvised. The tortoise that crawls in front of the Mariachi was not planned, but was kept in anyway. Similarly, there is a scene in which the Mariachi buys a coconut, but Rodriguez forgot to show him paying for the fruit; instead of driving back to the place to shoot additional scenes, Rodriguez decided to build in a voice-over in which the Mariachi asserts that the coconuts were for free. Improvisation was also useful to cover up continuity mistakes: at the end of the movie, the Mariachi has his left hand shot, but Rodriguez forgot to bring the metal glove to cover up the actor's hand; he solved it by packing his hand with black duct tape.

In the DVD commentary, Rodriguez describes the acting of Peter Marquardt who portrayed gangster boss Moco. As the language of the film was Spanish, which Marquardt did not master, he had to learn his lines without understanding what he was saying. Rodriguez describes the running gag in which Moco strikes a match using the stubble of his henchman Bigotón as a means to start and end the film: after Moco is killed, Bigotón does the same to him. When Moco was hit in the chest in the final shooting, Marquardt's blood squib exploded with such force that he actually crumpled to the ground in pain.

Originally, the film was meant to be sold on the Latino video market as funding for another bigger and better project that Rodriguez was contemplating. However, after being rejected from various Latino straight-to-video distributors, Rodriguez decided to send his film (it was in the format of a trailer at the time) to bigger distribution companies where it started to get attention.

When the sequel Desperado was produced, Antonio Banderas replaced Gallardo as the actor for the main character of the series. The filmmakers re-shot the final showdown from El Mariachi as a flashback sequence for Banderas' character in Desperado.

== Music ==
For the scene in which the Mariachi delivers a song in front of Dominó, Rodriguez hired Juan Francisco Suarez Vidaurri, a local entertainer. Recording the song with little more than a microphone held next to the musician, Rodriguez pitched the voice to match the voice of Mariachi actor Carlos Gallardo.

== Reception ==
=== Critical response ===
El Mariachi received positive reviews from critics. Review aggregator website Rotten Tomatoes shows a 91% score based on 77 reviews, and an average rating of 7.0/10. The site's consensus states: "Made on a shoestring budget, El Mariachi's story is not new. However, the movie has so much energy that it's thoroughly enjoyable." Metacritic reports a 73 out of 100 rating based on 9 critics, indicating "generally favorable" reviews.

=== Accolades ===
El Mariachi won multiple international awards, including the Independent Spirit Award for Best First Feature. Writer/producer/director Rodriguez went on to gain international fame; he was interviewed on such shows as Sábado Gigante and proceeded thereafter to secure Hollywood-backing for films such as The Faculty and Sin City. In December 2011, El Mariachi was deemed "culturally, historically, or aesthetically significant" by the United States Library of Congress and selected for preservation in the National Film Registry. Citing it as the film that "helped usher in the independent movie boom of the early 1990s", the Registry gave special mention to director Robert Rodriguez and his ability to merge two separate genres of films—"the narcotraficante film, a Mexican police genre, and the transnational warrior-action film, itself rooted in Hollywood Westerns"—successfully "despite the constraints of a shoestring budget."

== Sequel ==
A sequel titled Desperado was released in 1995.

== Television series ==
Sony's AXN channel confirmed that it would air TV series adaptation called El Mariachi. The series premiered on March 20, 2014.

== Book ==
The story of the film's production inspired Rodriguez to write the book Rebel Without a Crew: Or How a 23-Year-Old Filmmaker with $7,000 Became a Hollywood Player, which chronicles this film's origins, production and the eventual acclaim and success it achieved.
