= Desperado (film) =

1995 film by Robert Rodriguez

- Theatrical release poster
- Directed by: Robert Rodriguez
- Written by: Robert Rodriguez
- Produced by: Robert Rodriguez; Bill Borden
- Starring: Antonio Banderas; Joaquim de Almeida; Salma Hayek; Steve Buscemi; Cheech Marin; Quentin Tarantino
- Cinematography: Guillermo Navarro
- Edited by: Robert Rodriguez
- Music by: Los Lobos
- Production companies: Columbia Pictures; Los Hooligans Productions
- Distributed by: Sony Pictures Releasing
- Release dates: May 25, 1995 (Cannes); August 25, 1995 (United States)
- Running time: 105 minutes
- Country: United States
- Languages: English; Spanish
- Budget: $7 million
- Box office: $58 million

Desperado is a 1995 American neo-Western action film written, co-produced, edited, and directed by Robert Rodriguez. A sequel to El Mariachi (1993) and it is the second installment of Rodriguez's Mexico Trilogy. It stars Antonio Banderas as El Mariachi, who seeks revenge on the drug lord who killed his lover. The film was screened out of competition at the 1995 Cannes Film Festival on May 25, 1995.

Desperado grossed $58 million worldwide, and received mixed to positive reviews. Co-starring Salma Hayek, it has been cited as her English-language breakout role.

== Plot ==
At the Tarasco bar in Mexico, Buscemi, an American man, talks about witnessing a massacre in another bar, committed by El Mariachi, a Mexican with a guitar case full of guns. Tarasco's patrons are uninterested until Buscemi mentions drug lord "Bucho". Moco, Bucho's underling, killed El Mariachi's lover and shot his left hand. Buscemi, who is secretly a friend of El Mariachi, soon discovers that Bucho's underlings work and drink at the Tarasco bar.

El Mariachi meets a child, whose father allegedly plays guitar for a living. Having been a guitarist himself, El Mariachi gives the boy some guitar lessons. At the Tarasco bar, El Mariachi kills Bucho's henchmen. Tavo, a man conducting illegal business in the bar's secret back room, follows El Mariachi outside and wounds him. El Mariachi then kills him. Carolina, a woman whom El Mariachi shielded from Tavo's bullets, takes him to her bookstore. Threatened by the carnage, Bucho orders his men to hunt down El Mariachi.

Meanwhile, Carolina tends to El Mariachi's wounds. He then goes to a church and talks to Buscemi. Upset by the massacre at the bar, Buscemi convinces El Mariachi to abandon his quest for revenge. They are then ambushed by Navajas, a man armed with throwing knives who kills Buscemi and severely wounds El Mariachi. Navajas was sent by Colombian criminals to kill El Mariachi. However, before he can accomplish his task, Bucho's men arrive at the scene and kill Navajas, mistaking him for El Mariachi.

While wandering the streets, an injured El Mariachi meets the child again. He learns that the kid is being used by his father to mule drugs hidden in his guitar. The boy reveals that most people in the town work for Bucho. El Mariachi returns to Carolina and learns that Bucho financed her bookstore as an additional front for his drug dealing. Bucho then arrives, and she hides El Mariachi. After Bucho leaves, Carolina completes the suturing of El Mariachi's wounds. That evening, she gives El Mariachi a new guitar, which he plays for her before they have sex. Meanwhile, Bucho realizes that Carolina lied to him.

The next morning, Bucho's men arrive and attack El Mariachi and Carolina, setting the bookstore ablaze. They fight their way out of the burning building and onto a rooftop, where El Mariachi gets a clear shot at Bucho, but chooses not to kill him. The two then hide in a hotel room. Bucho becomes angry at his men for their failure to kill El Mariachi. He shoots one of his men and then fires at the others.

Realizing that Bucho will never stop hunting him, El Mariachi contacts his friends, Campa and Quino, for assistance. The trio meets up on the edge of town and encounters Bucho's henchmen. A gunfight ensues, and most of Bucho's men, along with Campa and Quino, are killed. After the child is wounded during the showdown, El Mariachi rushes him to a hospital.

El Mariachi and Carolina travel to Bucho's compound intending to confront him. Bucho is then revealed to be El Mariachi's older brother, Cesar. El Mariachi was unaware of Bucho's identity, until he saw his brother's face, from the rooftop, and refrained from shooting him. Bucho offers to release El Mariachi if he allows Bucho to kill Carolina. El Mariachi kills Bucho, then shoots the remaining henchmen. The lovers visit the boy in the hospital, and El Mariachi leaves alone. Carolina catches up to him on the road and picks him up, with El Mariachi initially leaving his guitar case full of weapons on the side of the road. The two drive away together, but shortly return and pick up the guitar case, just to be safe.

== Cast ==
- Antonio Banderas as Manito "El Mariachi"
- Joaquim de Almeida as Cesar "Bucho"
- Salma Hayek as Carolina
- Steve Buscemi as Buscemi
- Cheech Marin as Short Bartender
- Quentin Tarantino as Pick-Up Guy
- Carlos Gomez as Memo "Right Hand"
- Tito Larriva as Tavo
- Angel Aviles as Zamira
- Danny Trejo as Navajas
- Abraham Verduzco as Niño
- Carlos Gallardo as Campa
- Albert Michel Jr. as Quino
- David Alvarado as Buddy
- Fernando Torres as Kid Who Played Guitar
- Angela Lanza as Tourist Girl
- Peter Marquardt as Mauricio "Moco"
- Consuelo Gómez as Dominó

== Production ==
Rodriguez's friend Quentin Tarantino has a cameo as "Pick-up Guy". Carlos Gallardo, who played the title role of El Mariachi, appears in Desperado as Campa, a friend of Banderas' Mariachi. Since Banderas replaced Gallardo as the actor for the main character, the filmmakers re-shot the final showdown from El Mariachi as a flashback sequence for Banderas' character in Desperado.

Raúl Juliá was originally cast as Bucho, but died on October 24, 1994, before production began.

Principal photography took place entirely in Ciudad Acuña, Mexico, across from Del Rio, Texas.

During the filming of the sex scene, Salma Hayek became uncomfortable and started crying. Hayek has stated that Rodriguez and Banderas "were amazing" and that Rodriguez "never put pressure on me."

== Music ==
The film's score is written and performed by the Los Angeles rock band Los Lobos, performing Chicano rock and traditional ranchera music. Their performance of "Mariachi Suite" won the Grammy Award for Best Pop Instrumental Performance at the 1995 Grammy Awards. Other artists on the soundtrack album include Dire Straits, Link Wray, Latin Playboys, and Carlos Santana. Musician Tito Larriva has a small role in the film, and his band, Tito & Tarantula, contributed to the soundtrack as well.

American figure skater Nathan Chen used "Canción del Mariachi" as the music for his 2020-21 skating season short program, skating in a costume that closely resembles Banderas' black pants and white shirt in the film.

The "canción del Mariachi" that we hear at the beginning of the film is regularly used by the famous Spanish-Georgian UFC fighter Ilia Topuria as his walkout song in the octagon.

== Release ==
=== Rating ===
After it was submitted to the Motion Picture Association of America, the film was granted an NC-17 due to graphic violence and it had to be severely cut for an R rating. Among the scenes that were trimmed are the deaths of Tarantino's character and his friend at the bar, as well as Trejo's character. By far the most major excision came at the end of the film, which originally contained a large-scale shootout between El Mariachi, Carolina, Bucho, and his thugs at Bucho's mansion. Owing to the amount of footage the MPAA demanded be removed from the scene, Rodriguez elected to remove the sequence in its entirety, giving the film its current fade-out ending. Two additional scenes were also deleted featuring the codpiece gun (seen in the guitar case). Originally, the gun was used by El Mariachi during the second bar shootout when he uses it to shoot the first thug before whipping out his pistols from his sleeves and finishing him off. In a second deleted scene, the crotch gun was to go off accidentally while Banderas is in bed with Hayek, blowing a hole through the guitar while they were playing it. The gun was eventually used in unrelated Rodriguez's films From Dusk till Dawn and Machete Kills.

=== Home media ===
Desperado was released on VHS on February 6, 1996, by Columbia TriStar Home Video.

== Reception ==
=== Box office ===
The film grossed $25.4 million in the United States and Canada and $58 million worldwide.

=== Critical response ===
On Rotten Tomatoes the film has an approval rating of 71% based on reviews from 55 critics, with an average rating of 6.5/10, The site's consensus reads, "Desperado contains almost too much action and too little of a story to sustain interest, but Antonio Banderas proves a charismatic lead in Robert Rodriguez's inventive extravaganza." On Metacritic it has a score of 55 out of 100, based on reviews from 18 critics, indicating "mixed or average" reviews. Audiences polled by CinemaScore gave the film an average grade of "B+" on an A+ to F scale.

Todd McCarthy of Variety wrote that the film "could scarcely be more dazzling on a purely visual level, but it's mortally anemic in the story, character and thematic departments." Owen Gleiberman of Entertainment Weekly rated the film "B" and praised the action sequences despite the lack of characterization. Janet Maslin of The New York Times wrote, "Overdependence on violence also marginalizes Desperado as a gun-slinging novelty item, instead of the broader effort toward which this talented young director might have aspired."

Roger Ebert of The Chicago Sun-Times rated it 2 out of 4 stars and wrote, "What happens looks terrific. Now if he can harness that technical facility to a screenplay that's more story than setup, he might really have something." Desson Howe of The Washington Post wrote, "the commercial transition has been remarkably successful. This is primarily thanks to Rodriguez, who not only retains the original movie's kinetic flair, but takes it further." Bob McCabe of Empire rated it 4 out of 5 stars and wrote, "It's big, it's daft, but Desperado is confident and hugely entertaining filmmaking." Heidi Strom of the Daily Press wrote, "A pure adrenaline rush from start to finish, Desperado will shock, amuse, thrill and disgust – but never disappoint."

=== Legacy ===
The film's opening scene is directly homaged (complete with use of Dire Straits' "Six Blade Knife") in Episode 8 of the 2019 Hulu series, Reprisal.

== Sequel ==
A sequel titled Once Upon a Time in Mexico was released in 2003.
