= David Hopkins (writer) =

American comic book writer and essayist

David Hopkins (born May 1, 1977) is an American comic book writer and essayist. His works include Karma Incorporated and Emily Edison from publisher Viper Comics, Astronaut Dad, and a comic book adaptation of Antigone with frequent collaborator artist Tom Kurzanski. He writes a regular comic feature for D Magazine called Souvenir of Dallas with artist Paul Milligan. David is a contributor to the Smart Pop Series from BenBella Books. He is the co-host and co-producer of Fanboy Radio's Indie Show, that showcases independent and small press comics. David lives in Arlington, Texas with his daughter Kennedy.

== Career ==
David Hopkins first professional writing was after college in 2002. Aja Jones asked him to write a stage play for her theatre troupe to be performed at the University of Texas at Arlington. The only performance of "Space to Occupy" was on September 14, 2002. Immediately afterwards, Hopkins began writing comics.

The first year, Hopkins wrote a five issue series The Insight. Set in Dallas, Hopkins used extensive photo references from actual locations in the city. (He would later do this for Karma Incorporated, which also takes place in Dallas.) Over the course of two years, there were two different artists attached to the project, which never came together and remains unpublished.

In June 2003, Hopkins wrote a 144-page graphic novel Astronaut Dad—a fictional story about three astronaut families living in Houston, set in 1963. Hopkins cites this work as his "most personally satisfying". It is set to be published by Silent Devil Productions.

Later that year, encouraged by the Isotope Awards, Hopkins self-published a mini-comic "Some Other Day" with artist Brian Kelly.

In 2004, Hopkins' first published work was a short story in Viper Comics Dead@17: Rough Cut. Creator Josh Howard invited him to contribute to this anthology. Afterwards, he also wrote short stories for Western Tales of Terror, Silent Forest Television Parody Special, and Dead@17: Rough Cut Volume 2.

At San Diego Comic-Con in 2005, Viper Comics released Hopkins first series Karma Incorporated, illustrated by Tom Kurzanski and colored by Marlena Hall. In addition to the standard blue cover of issue one, a red exclusive variant cover was printed as part of the Diamond Distributors exclusives for that year. A second series was approved, but never completed.

Hopkins wrote Emily Edison, which was published by Viper Comics in 2006, and illustrated by Brock Rizy. It was released as a trade paperback. That summer, Rizy and Hopkins went on a month-long book tour to promote the release through California, Texas, Oklahoma, and Kansas.

David Hopkins is also an English III and Creative Writing teacher at Martin High School in Arlington, Texas.

== Interviews ==
- David and Brent Schoonover on It Came Out on Wednesday presented by ComiXology.com, talking about Astronaut Dad
- Hopkins & His Astronaut Dad
- David Hopkins talks Emily Edison with CBR
- 10 Questions with David Hopkins
- Comic Foundry Interview with David Hopkins and Tom Kurzanski
- Comic Foundry Interview with David Hopkins and Brock Rizy

== Awards ==
- Dallas Observer Best Of 2006 "Best Local Comic Book Writer"
- American Library Association's Great Graphic Novels for Teens List 2007"
