= Rick Hautala =

American novelist (1949–2013)

- Born: Richard Andrew Hautala; February 3, 1949; Rockport, Massachusetts, U.S.
- Died: March 21, 2013 (aged 64); Westbrook, Maine, U.S.
- Education: University of Maine (MA)
- Occupations: Writer, screenwriter
- Writing career
- Pen name: A. J. Matthews
- Period: 1980–2013
- Genres: horror fiction, speculative fiction
- Website: rickhautala.com

Rick Hautala (February 3, 1949 – March 21, 2013) was an American speculative fiction and horror writer. He graduated from the University of Maine in 1974, where he received a Master of Art in English Literature. Hautala arrived on the horror scene in 1980 with several of his early novels published by Zebra books. He wrote and published over 90 novels and short stories since the early 1980s. A number of his books have been translated to other languages and sold internationally. Cold Whisper, published in October, 1991 by Zebra Books, Inc. was also published in Finnish as Haamu by Werner Söderström, Helsinki, Finland, in August, 1994. Toward the end of his life, many of his works were published with specialty press and small press publishers like Cemetery Dance Publications and Dark Harvest. His novel The Wildman (2008), was chosen to be Full Moon Press' debut limited edition title.

Rick Hautala's third novel, 1986's Night Stone, was one of the first books to feature a holographic cover and it became an international best-seller, selling well over one million copies. "Knocking" was a part of the Bram Stoker Award winning anthology 999: New Stories of Horror and Suspense ("Best Anthology of 1999"). His short story collection, Bedbugs (1999) was selected by Barnes & Noble as one of the most distinguished horror publications of the year 2000.

Hautala also wrote screenplays, including a 2008 adaptation of Kealan Patrick Burke's short story "Peekers". He also wrote the screenplay for the 2007 short film Dead@17 based on Josh Howard's graphic novel series of the same name, and The Ugly File, directed by Mark Steensland, based on the short story by Ed Gorman.

The Horror Writers Association gave him and Joe R. Lansdale the Bram Stoker Award for Lifetime Achievement for 2011, which they received at the Bram Stoker Awards Banquet in Salt Lake City, Utah on 31 March 2012.

He died of a heart attack on March 21, 2013.

== Selected bibliography ==
=== Novels and novellas ===
- Moondeath (Zebra Books, 1980)
- Moonbog (Zebra Books, 1982)
- Night Stone (Zebra Books, 1986)
- Little Brothers (Zebra Books, 1988)
- Moon Walker (Zebra Books, 1989)
- Winter Wake (Zebra Books, 1989)
- Dead Voices (Zebra Books, 1990)
- Cold Whisper (Zebra Books, 1991)
- Dark Silence (Zebra Books, 1992)
- Ghost Light (Zebra Books, 1993)
- Twilight Time (Zebra Books, 1994)
- Shades of Night (Zebra Books, 1995)
- Beyond the Shroud (White Wolf Publishing, 1995)
- The Mountain King (Cemetery Dance Publications, 1996) ISBN 1-881475-16-6
- Impulse (Kensington Publishing, 1996)
- Poltergeist: The Legacy – The Hidden Saint (Berkley/Putnam, 1999)
- The Wildman (Full Moon Press, 2008) – artwork by Alan M. Clark
- Reunion (PS Publishing, 2009)
- Rough Winds (Necon ebooks, 2012)
- Indian Summer (Cemetery Dance Publications, 2013)
- Chills (Cemetery Dance Publications, 2014) ISBN 978-1-58767-296-5
- The Demon's Wife (JournalStone, 2013)
- Star Road, with Matthew Costello (Thomas Dunne Books, 2014)
- Waiting (Haverhill House Publishing, 2017)ISBN 978-0977925643

==== Chapbooks ====
- Oilman (Cemetery Dance Publications, 2005) -released as a double chapbook with Gary A. Braunbeck's Our Things
- Chrysalis (Ghostwriter Publications, 2010) – A Little Brothers related story.
- Scared Crows (Ghostwriter Publications, 2010) – with Jim Connolly. A HELLBOY story.

==== The Jenna Blake Body of Evidence series ====
All books in the Body of Evidence series are co-authored with Christopher Golden

1. Skin Deep (Pocket Books, 2000)
2. Burning Bones (Pocket, 2001) ISBN 0-671-77584-7
3. Brain Trust (Pocket, 2001)
4. Last Breath (Pocket, 2004)
5. Throat Culture (Pocket, 2005)

==== As A. J. Matthews ====
Books published under the pseudonym A. J. Matthews:

- The White Room (Berkley Books, 2001)
- Looking Glass (Berkley/Putnam, 2003)
- Follow (Berkley/Putnam, 2005)
- Unbroken (Berkley/Putnam, 2007)

=== Screenplays ===
- Lovecraft's Pillow (2006) – based on a suggestion by Stephen King
- Dead@17 (2007) – based on Josh Howard's graphic novel series
- Peekers (2008) – based on the short story by Kealan Patrick Burke
- The Ugly File – based on the short story by Ed Gorman

=== Collections ===
- Bedbugs (Cemetery Dance Publications, 1999) ISBN 1-881475-79-4 – Short story collection illustrated by Glenn Chadbourne
- Four Octobers (Cemetery Dance Publications, 2006) ISBN 1-58767-162-X – Novella collection that includes: Tin Can Telephone, Miss Henry's Bottles, Blood Ledge, and Cold River
- Untcigahunk: Stories and Myths of the Little Brothers (Delirium Books, 2007) – Contains the novel Little Brothers and collects all of the Little Brothers related short stories to date.

- Also released as Untcigahunk: The Complete Little Brothers in e-book format from Macabre Ink in 2012.

- Occasional Demons (Cemetery Dance Publications, 2010) ISBN 1-58767-095-X – Short story collection that includes some of his Little Brothers related stories

- Also released in e-book format from Macabre Ink in 2012.

- Glimpses: The Best Short Stories of Rick Hautala (Dark Regions Press, 2013)

=== Anthology appearances ===
- 999, edited by Al Sarrantonio (Cemetery Dance Publications, 1999) ISBN 1-881475-97-2 – Contains the short story "Knocking"
- Night Visions 9 (Dark Harvest, 1991) ISBN 0-440-21114-X – Includes the short stories "The Birch Whistle", "Chrysalis", and "Deal with the Devils"
- Eulogies: A Horror World Yearbook, edited by Nanci Kalanta (NYX Publications/HW Press, 2006) ISBN 0-9776681-0-X – Includes the Little Brothers Story "The Witch House"
- Evermore, edited by James Robert Smith and Stephen Mark Rainey (Arkham House, 2006) ISBN 0-87054-185-4 – Contains the short story "They Call Me Eddie", co-authored with Thomas F. Monteleone
- October Dreams: A Celebration of Halloween, edited by Richard Chizmar (Cemetery Dance Publications, 2000) ISBN 978-0451458957 – Contains the essay "My Favorite Halloween Memory"
- Exotic Gothic, edited by Danel Olson (Ash-Tree Press, 2007). ISBN 978-1-55310-099-7 – Contains the short story co-authored with Mark Steensland and inspired by a comment from Stephen King, "Lovecraft's Pillow"
