= Les McClaine =

American comic book artist

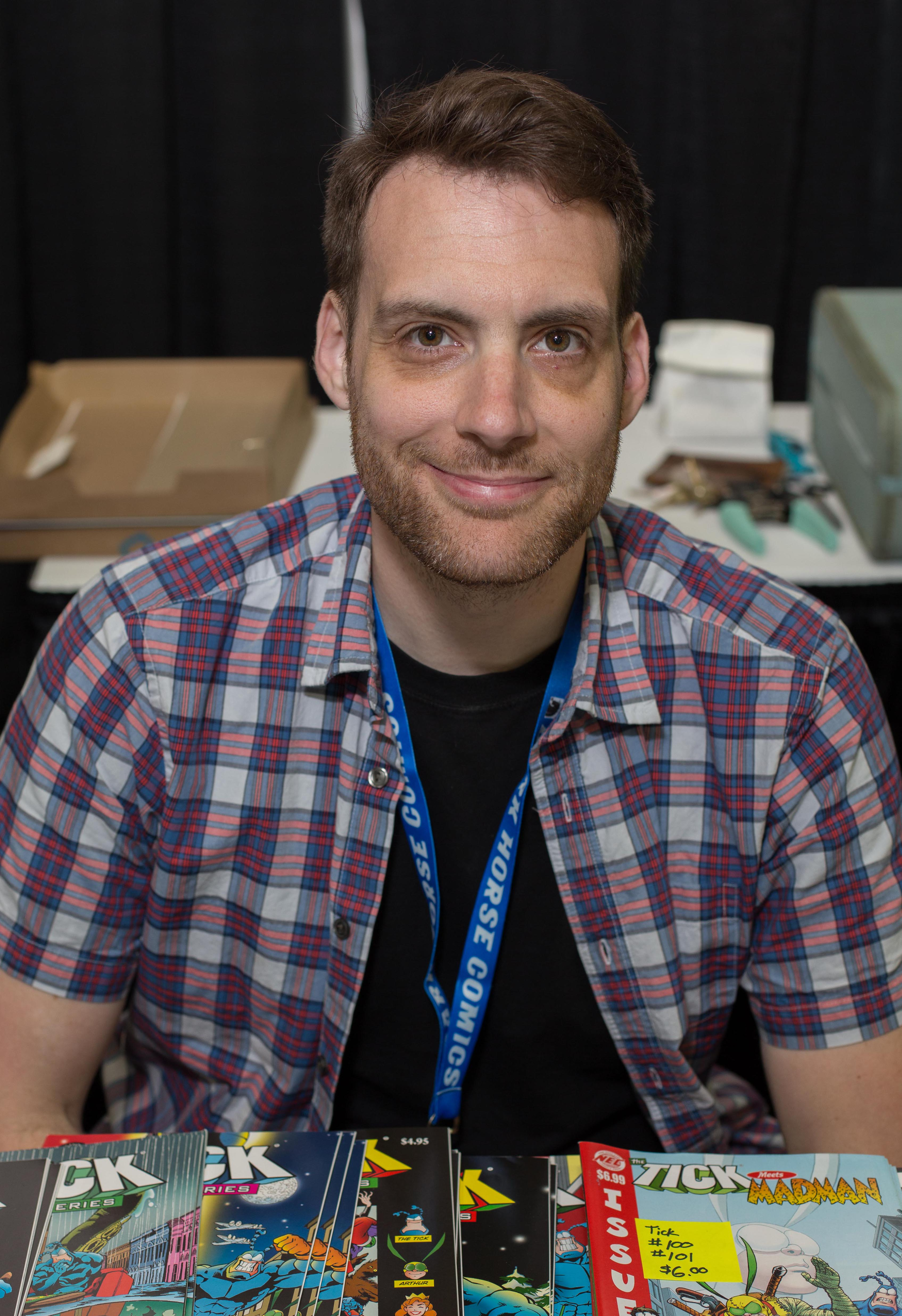
- Les McClaine at Stumptown Comics Fest 2013
- Born: Leslie McClaine; September 30, 1977 (age 49) Ventura, California
- Areas: Penciller, Inker, Writer
- Notable works: Highway 13, Jonny Crossbones, The Middleman; The Tick

Leslie "Les" McClaine (born September 30, 1977, in Ventura, California) is an American comic book artist. He grew up in Lexington, Massachusetts, where he worked in the public library. After graduating from high school, Les attended the Savannah College of Art and Design, where he majored in sequential art, and graduated cum laude. Following college, Les created the comic book series, Highway 13 for Slave Labor Graphics, which ran for ten issues. Around the same time, Les produced the popular web-comic Life With Leslie, an autobiographical comic strip that was later published in a collection titled Repeat Until Death.

Currently, Les resides in Portland, Oregon and his work can be seen in the comic book, The Middle Man, written and co-created by Javier Grillo-Marxuach, and published by Viper Comics. In 2008 it made its debut as a TV series The Middleman (TV series). He also worked on The Tick the New Series from New England Comics.

Les has also been occasional freelance contributor to The Portland Mercury newspaper as an illustrator.

For over 10 years Les has been working on the throwback adventure webcomic, Jonny Crossbones. In 2005 Les was nominated for an Eisner Award in the Best Digital Comic category for Jonny Crossbones.

Starting in 2013 McClaine began working as a character designer for Fox's Axe Cop (TV series) as well as the Major Lazer (TV series) and Golan the Insatiable.

== Bibliography ==
- Highway 13 (2001)
- Jonny Crossbones (2004)
- The Middleman Vol 1: The Trade Paperback Imperative (2005)
- The Middleman Vol 2: The Second Volume Inevitability (2006)
- The Middleman Vol 3: The Third Volume Inescapability (2007)
- Tune: Still Life, by Derek Kirk Kim (2013)
- Old Souls, by Brian McDonald (2019)
- TinkerActive Workbooks, by various authors (2019-2020)
- Maker Comics: Live Sustainably!, by Angela Boyle (2022)
- Books of Clash Vol. 1, by Gene Luen Yang (2023)
- Books of Clash Vol. 2, by Gene Luen Yang (2023)
- Books of Clash Vol. 4, by Gene Luen Yang (2024)

== Works ==
Jonny Crossbones

Jonny Crossbones follows the adventures of a young mechanic who is covered from head to toe in a skeleton costume. He meets a young woman named Gretchen and together they go searching for lost pirate treasure, with many complications along the way.
