= The Middleman (TV series) =

- Genre: Action-adventure; Science fiction Comedy-drama
- Created by: Javier Grillo-Marxuach; Les McClaine
- Developed by: Javier Grillo-Marxuach
- Starring: Matt Keeslar; Natalie Morales; Mary Pat Gleason; Brit Morgan; Jake Smollett
- Theme music composer: Tree Adams
- Country of origin: United States
- Original language: English
- No. of seasons: 1
- No. of episodes: 12

Production
- Executive producers: Javier Grillo-Marxuach; John Ziffren
- Producers: Shane Keller; Sarah Watson; Ron McLeod
- Production companies: Grillo-Marxuach Design Gureau; ProdCo Original

Original release
- Network: ABC Family
- Release: June 16 – September 1, 2008

The Middleman is an American television series. The series, which was developed for television by Javier Grillo-Marxuach for ABC Family, is based on the Viper Comics series, The Middleman, created by Grillo-Marxuach and Les McClaine. The series ran for one season in 2008.

Originally confirmed for an initial 13 episodes, the order was reduced to a 12-episode season due to low ratings. In February 2009, a comic book based on the unproduced 13th episode was announced, confirming the series' cancellation. Billed as a "series finale", The Middleman – The Doomsday Armageddon Apocalypse was released in July 2009. The complete series DVD set was released by Shout! Factory on July 28, 2009.

== Premise ==
Wendy Watson, a struggling artist, is recruited by a secret agency to fight against evil forces. Wendy lives in an illegal sublet apartment with her young, photogenic, animal activist friend Lacey. The Middleman is a freelance fixer of "exotic problems", which include mad scientists bent on taking over the world, hostile aliens, and various supernatural threats, aided by Ida, a robot in the form of a grumpy schoolmarm.

Because of Wendy Watson's coolness under pressure and photographic memory, the Middleman recruits her to become the next Middleman-in-training. Wendy struggles to balance her world-saving adventures with her friendships with Lacey and her neighbor Noser.

The series includes numerous pop-culture references. For example, in the first episode, Wendy calls herself "Robin the Boy Hostage", a quote from the comic book The Dark Knight Returns by Frank Miller; that same episode features a super-intelligent ape who murders several members of the Italian Mafia and spouts catchphrases from American movies about the Mafia, such as Scarface, Goodfellas and The Godfather.

== Cast and characters ==
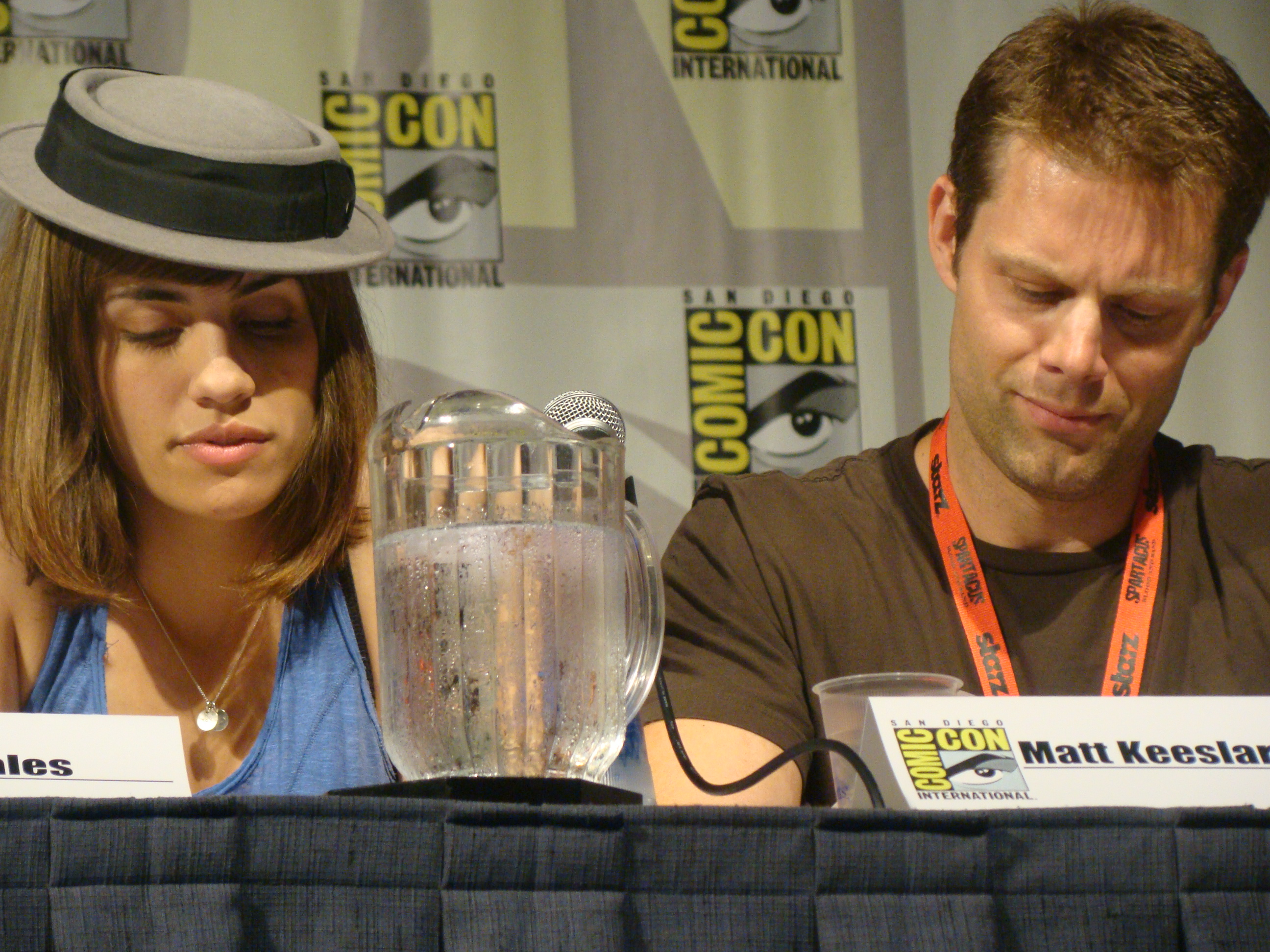
Natalie Morales and Matt Keeslar at 2009 Comic-Con panel for The Middleman

- The Middleman – Matt Keeslar
- Wendy Watson – Natalie Morales
- Ida – Mary Pat Gleason
- Lacey Thornfield – Brit Morgan
- Noser – Jake Smollett

== Episodes ==
=== Season 1 (2008) ===
No.	Title	Directed by	Written by	Original release date
1	"The Pilot Episode Sanction"	Jeremiah Chechik	Javier Grillo-Marxuach	June 16, 2008
It was just another day in the exciting world of temporary employment for Cuban semi-abstract expressionist artist Wendy Watson. Answering phones at A.N.D Laboratories (re-scrambling your D.N.A), fending off the attention of her overly-interested mother, then, in just the amount of time it takes to say "what the [bleep] was that?" an experiment at the Lab has gone hideously wrong, leaving behind a "Hentai"-style tentacle monster in its wake. Though the catastrophe costs Wendy her job, it throws her into the world of The Middleman, a clean-living gentlemen tasked with extricating aliens, monsters and other weird abnormalities from this Earth. Just in time too, since there are thieving apes running around with guns, quoting famous mafia films. The episode is based on the first volume of the "Middleman" comic.
2	"The Accidental Occidental Conception"	Michael Zinberg	Sarah Watson	June 23, 2008
When a Terra Cotta Warrior is brought back to life, The Middleman and Wendy set out to stop him before he can take the last living heir of the Qin dynasty to the land of the dead, releasing a hail of fire that will rain down on the Earth for a thousand years. With some help from fashionista and reformed succubus, Roxy Wasserman, the two must make a daring trip to the underworld to get the deed done. However, the realisation that the underworld could hold the key to a question which has haunted Wendy's childhood threatens to distract her from what needs to be done. Meanwhile, Lacey embarks on a mission to rid Roxy Wasserman's succubus-infested house of fur, little realising the existence of succubi or the importance of the finely balanced mineral content of Tahiti water, both of which threaten to put lives in jeopardy.
3	"The Sino-Mexican Revelation"	Jeremiah Chechik	Javier Grillo-Marxuach	June 30, 2008
A decade-long blood-feud between Wendy's inbound martial arts instructor Sensei Ping and a band of rebellious Lucha Libre wrestlers finally comes to a head when both Sensei Ping and The Middleman are kidnapped. As such, it falls to Wendy to combine her ability to both fly vertical takeoff jets and tell the difference between a Teledyne Water Pik with a custom high-output heating element & aftermarket turbo power wash accelerator and a laser beam powered by the world's most complicated diamond to save the two captives from certain peril. Before, after, and during the aforementioned events though, the young Tyler Ford, musician extraordinaire steps into Wendy's life and she is shocked to learn that she was not the only one on the Middleman's list of potential recruits. The episode is based on the second volume of the "Middleman" comic.
4	"The Manicoid Teleportation Conundrum"	Jeremiah Chechik	Tracey Stern	July 7, 2008
Wendy's inability to properly channel her emotional fall-out from her break-up with Ben heightens tensions both between her and Lacey and her working relationship with The Middleman. When the intrepid duo are sent to solve the mysterious disappearances of a benevolent alien race with a sweet-tooth for precious gems Wendy is inadvertently teleported to a deserted hunting reserve where Dr. Gil, a usually affable TV psychiatrist is looking for something fresh to put on his mantle. It's like The Most Dangerous Game… with aliens.
5	"The Flying Fish Zombification"	Allan Kroeker	Andy Reaser	July 14, 2008
Flying fish, trout-craving zombies, poisonous energy drinks and an RV hurtling towards a defenceless husband. All make up a terrifyingly normal day at the office for Wendy Watson. While trying to put on the latest incarnation of Art Crawl - an outlet for the creative minds in Wendy's apartment complex - Wendy struggles to cope with the demands of her job and the demands of her everyday life, throwing a hefty bag of spanners in the works of the usually smooth relationship between her and sexy boss man. The plot of a greed-driven businessman to infect the world-at-large with a disease which turns them into fish-craving zombified humans does little to ease the tension.
6	"The Boyband Superfan Interrogation"	Norman Buckley	Jordan Rosenberg	July 21, 2008
As little warp holes are popping up throughout the city, Wendy and The Middleman are on the hunt for the culprit. Their search soon leads them to a foul-mouthed, boy-band obsessed 14-year-old who is more than she seems. Realizing that this little girl is actually an alien warrior sent to prevent an exiled alien dictator and his generals, who are posing as a world famous boy-band named Varsity Fanclub, from returning to their home planet and wreaking havoc, The Middleman and Wendy step aside. But when they find out that if the little girl's plan to stop the boy-band succeeds, their loyal sidekick Ida becomes toast, they cannot just sit idly by. Catch-22 gets a comic-book flavour as the twosome must choose between friendships, and the extinction of human life.
7	"The Cursed Tuba Contingency"	Jeremiah Chechik	Hans Beimler	July 28, 2008
If a cursed tuba from the Titanic is played, it will cause all those who hear it to drown in the icy waters of the north Atlantic. So Wendy and the Middleman don period clothes and attend a Titanic-themed yacht party in order to stop the tuba's original owner from giving a performance. Elsewhere, The Middleman and Lacey embark on their first date.
8	"The Ectoplasmic Panhellenic Investigation"	Michael Zinberg	Sarah Watson	August 4, 2008
"Ghosts of the living", both a snappy interjection and an apt summary of the dangers faced by The Middleman and his enthusiastic side-kick. A haunting on a sorority campus looks routine enough, until Wendy realises that the ghosts floating around still have very-much-alive human counterparts. Beneath the tale lies jealousy, debauchery and 40-minute conversations about who called who 'fat'. Meanwhile, Tyler Ford attempts to retrace the events from his two-day-amnesia, adamant that he met his soul-mate in the missing days. His mission proves semi-successful, leading him straight into the arms of Lacey Thornfield. Wendy is none-too-pleased to learn of the boy-of-her-dreams hooking up with her best friend, but she has that ghost problem and the prospect of yet another destructive explosion to worry about first.
9	"The Obsolescent Cryogenic Meltdown"	Michael Grossman	Tracey Stern	August 11, 2008
The strong whiff of déjà vu surrounding a robbery with a melting ray leads to the release of the hitherto cryogenically frozen Middleman from the 1960s (Kevin Sorbo). With two Middlemen working together, the prospects look bleak for super-villain The Candle, but the 1960s Middleman becomes increasingly obsessed with catching The Candle, even when evidence points to the demise of said super-villain. Undeterred, 1960s Middleman enlists Wendy to transport him – in the asbestos lined 'cancer sub' – to a secret island, where the 1960s Middleman believes The Candle is holing up for a final assault. Unexpected dangers, however, lie in wait for all present.
10	"The Vampiric Puppet Lamentation"	Sandy Smolan	Andy Reaser	August 18, 2008
When artefacts from Vlad the Impaler go up for auction, Wendy and The Middleman prepare to acquire them all in effort to stop a possible vampire resurgence. But things go horribly awry when the last artefact, Vlad’s beloved ventriloquist puppet Vladdy, takes over the soul of the auctioneer and gets away. Now The Middleman and Wendy must stop Vladdy from reuniting with his puppet bride and bringing on an eternal night of blood. Things only go from bad to worse when the demonic puppet learns about The Middleman’s feelings for Lacey and uses her to force our hero to make a dangerous decision. Meanwhile, when Noser mysteriously disappears, Lacey joins forces with Pip to track down their missing friend, much to The Middleman’s chagrin.
11	"The Clotharian Contamination Protocol"	John Kretchmer	Margaret Dunlap	August 25, 2008
A seemingly routine space-probe recovery leads to the quarantining of Middleman HQ when the building is overrun by menacing nanobots. With the minuscule nasties controlling Ida, MM and Wendy must circumnavigate the building's oddly spacious ventilation system to send a shrunken Wendy into Ida's brain before the arrival of the seemingly imminent explosion which, once again, threatens the existence of life as we know it! It's like Fantastic Voyage, in a robot, or Die Hard… in a building.
12	"The Palindrome Reversal Palindrome"	Guy Norman Bee	Jordan Rosenberg	September 1, 2008
In the series finale, a taxing riddle leads our duo to the scene of a quantum singularity which tragically sends Wendy spiralling into an alternate universe. Awakening to a world where nothing is what it seems, run by an Orwellian totalitarian corporation, Wendy must try to find a way back to her own world. She turns to her friends for help, but her friends in this alt. universe are a little… different and the one man she trusts has turned into a nihilistic, chap-wearing rebel who refuses to help.

=== Unfilmed episode ===
While the episode was never filmed, the show's cast have performed a live reading of the episode script during the 2009 San Diego ComicCon. They are planning to release the video of the reading online. The script for this episode was later turned into a graphic novel published by Viper comics. This graphic novel, The Middleman: The Doomsday Armageddon Apocalypse, is intended to act as the TV series finale.

No.	Title	Written by
13	"The Doomsday Armageddon Apocalypse"	Javier Grillo-Marxuach
When Wendy and the Middleman discover they are being bugged via Wendy's tennis bracelet, the suspicion immediately falls on Tyler, however, a far more nefarious plot unravels involving Manservent Neville, mind-controlling networks of uMasters and the purification of mankind. While Wendy mourns a personal loss, The Middleman journeys to the underworld to enlist backup, but not before running into an old flame who just happens to know him by a name other than 'sexy boss man'. For this battle to be triumphant though, someone is going to have to make a heart-breaking sacrifice, and it's not the newsreader with a duck's head!

== Critical reception ==
The A.V. Club gave the entire series an A−. Daily Variety wrote that "this series could potentially work on any number of networks, and it's almost too smart for the room at ABC Family; nevertheless, this sprightly summer arrival should fit nicely into the evolving niche the channel established with Kyle XY." TV Guide had it as its "Mega Rave" for the week of June 15, 2008, and wrote that "It's loaded with clever banter – like Men in Black if Will Smith's character was a geeky girl." UGO gave it an A− overall and an A for story, calling it "fun to watch." The Boston Herald gave it a B− and wrote that "all that's missing are some onscreen blurbs like 'BAM!' and 'POW!'" Newsarama wrote that "stylistically, the current show this most resembles is Pushing Daisies, with its colorful sets and rapid-fire screwball dialogue" and that "it's about goofy ideas and having a good time, the kind of show you'll want to watch repeatedly to catch a line you missed the first time."
