= Bobby Edner =

American singer-songwriter dancer and actor

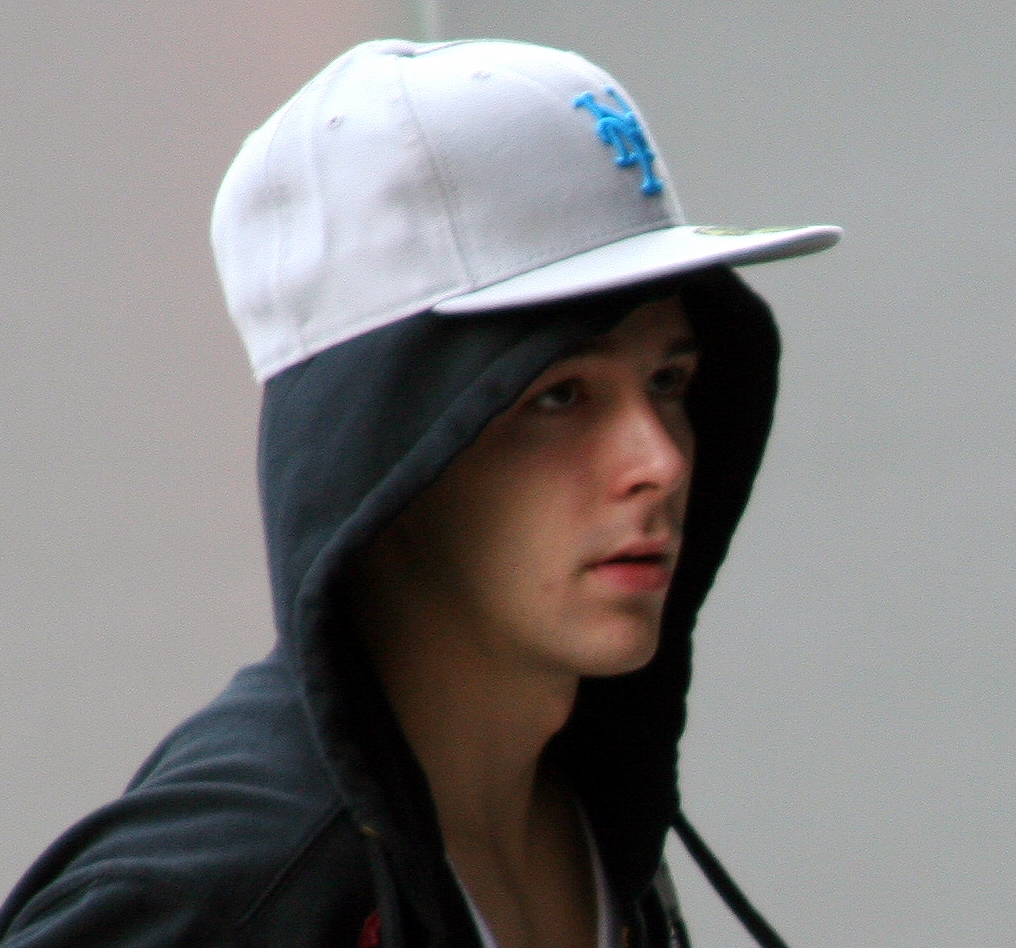
- Edner leaving B97 in New Orleans, Louisiana, following a live appearance with Varsity Fanclub on October 6, 2008
- Born: Robert Charles Edner; October 5, 1988 (age 37); Los Angeles County, California
- Occupations: Actor, singer, dancer, rapper
- Years active: 1995–present
- Relatives: Kevin Tancharoen (brother-in-law)

Robert Charles Edner (born October 5, 1988) is an American actor, singer, and dancer. He was a member of the boy band called Varsity Fan Club.

== Early life ==
Edner was born Robert Charles Edner to Cindy (née Halverson) and Robert Edner in Los Angeles County, California. He is the older brother of Ashley Edner (b. 1990), who is also an actress.

== Career ==
Edner's first credit was in 1997, as "Chip" in a straight-to-video Mary-Kate and Ashley Olsen release. After bit parts on various television shows, he made his first film appearance in 1999's The Muse, in the role of "Boy at Sarah's House". His role in the film 2003 Spy Kids 3-D: Game Over as Francis, a beta tester earned him the nickname "Spy Kid" from fellow Varsity Fanclub members. Edner has also made numerous guest appearances on television shows, including Charmed, Judging Amy, 7th Heaven, and Veronica Mars. Edner's acting work has been sporadic since the early 2000s, with gaps of several years between acting credits; his most recent role was in the 2015 film Dutch Hollow.

He has also done some voice work, providing additional ADR in films, including Agent Cody Banks, Kangaroo Jack, and Monsters, Inc., and was the English-language voice of Final Fantasy XII character Vaan. Edner has also worked in commercials and is the brother of Ashley Edner. Edner is a former member of the Hollywood Knights celebrity basketball team, and the NBA Entertainment League (NBAE).

=== Dancing and music career ===
Edner's dancing landed him a featured role – dancing like Michael Jackson – in the music video for Alien Ant Farm's cover version of "Smooth Criminal"; he appeared in Jennifer Lopez's "Ain't It Funny", as well.

Edner dueted with Alexa PenaVega on the song "Heart Drive" from the film Spy Kids 3-D: Game Over. He also co-wrote the song "Alone" with Ryan Cabrera.

From 2008 to 2011, Edner was a member of the boy band Varsity Fan Club, whose members have included David Lei Brandt, Drew Ryan Scott, Jayk Purdy, TC Carter and Thomas Fiss. On April 30, 2011, and May 1, 2011, Edner posted a series of public messages on his Twitter profile publicly discussing conflicts with the band's new (and as yet unsigned manager), Philipp Hallenberger. Edner claimed that he was not informed of an April 2011 Varsity Fanclub photo shoot and that he was being "forced out" of the band by Hallenberger. Edner posted on April 30, 2011: "Trust me, this is not my decision and I will be fighting this. I want nothing more than to be in this group and have no intention to quit."

=== Later years ===
In 2013, Edner became a personal fitness trainer for PUSH Private Fitness.

== Awards and nominations ==
Year	Nominee / work	Award	Result
1999	Step by Step	Youth in Film Award for Best Guest Starring Performance in a TV Comedy Series	Won (5-way tie)
2000	Touched by an Angel	Young Artist Award for Best Guest Starring Performance in a TV Drama Series	Nominated
2001	The Trial of Old Drum	Young Artist Award for Best Leading Performance in a television film (Drama)	Nominated
2002	The Day the World Ended	Young Artist Award for Best Leading Performance in a television film (Comedy or Drama)	Nominated
2002	Charmed	Young Artist Award for Best Guest Starring Performance in a TV Drama Series	Nominated
2003	Do Over	Young Artist Award for Best Guest Starring Performance in a TV Comedy Series	Nominated
2004	Spy Kids 3-D: Game Over	Young Artist Award for Best Young Ensemble in a Feature Film (group award)	Nominated

== Discography ==
=== Soundtracks ===
- Spy Kids 3-D: Game Over (2003) Song: "Heart Drive" performed with Alexa Vega

== Filmography ==
=== Film and television work ===
Year	Title	Role
1996	Sing Along Songs: Pongo & Perdita	Himself
1999	Late Last Night	Stranger Danger Kid
1999	The Muse	Boy at Sarah's House
2000	The Trial of Old Drum	Charlie Burden Jr.
2001	The Seventh Sense	Kyle
2001	The Penny Promise	Dustin Farnsworthy
2001	The Day the World Ended	Ben Miller/McCann
2003	Haunted Lighthouse	Edgar
2003	Spy Kids 3-D: Game Over	Francis
2006	Welcome to Paradise	Hayden Laramie

==== Television series guest-starring roles ====
Year	Title	Role	Notes
1997	You're Invited to Mary-Kate and Ashley's Christmas Party	Chip	
1997	Step by Step	Kid	
1998	Ellen	Kid	
1998	Saved by the Bell: The New Class	Little Zack	
1998	Baywatch	Tyler	
1998	Profiler	Ryan Andrews	
1998	Chicago Hope	Young Boy	
1999	Maggie Winters	Casey	
1999	ER	Zach	
1999	The Pretender	Ryan Wells	
1999	Seven Days	Vince Collins	
1999	Movie Stars	Marty Fineman	
1999	Touched by an Angel	Jimmy Avery	
1999	Martial Law	Zach Tyler	
2000	Then Came You	Young Aidan	
2001	Titus	Tommy	
2001	Charmed	Ari	
2001	Providence	Edward Joyce	
2001	MADtv	Michael	
2002	The Agency	Mark Steward	
2002	7th Heaven	Frank	
2002	The Chronicle	Victor Clark	
2002	Philly	Benjamin Deck	
2002	The Division	Bar Mitzvah Student	
2002	JAG	Tommy Akers	
2002	Birds of Prey	10-year-old 'Guy'	
2002	Judging Amy	Jesse Monk	
2002	Do Over	Larry Nachman	
2002	Who Knows the Band?	Himself	
2004	Veronica Mars	Justin Smith	Meet John Smith, Season One, Episode Three
2008	The Middle Man	Bobby	
2012	Switched at Birth	Avery	

=== Television commercials ===
Year	Company	Title	Notes
1995	Intel	"Big to Small"	
1995	Good Humor		
1997	HoneyBaked Ham	"War Room"	
1997	Puffs	"Basketball"	
1998	Alaska Airlines	"Good Lawn Boy"	
1998	Alaska Airlines	"Future Employee"	
1998	Radio Shack	"Where's Dad?"	
1998	Bissell	"Black Hole"	
1998	Bissell	"Lift Off"	
1998	Atlantic Gas	"The Cook Out"	
1999	Mybasics.com	"Guttermouths"	
1999	Buick	"Fast Lane"	
1999	Kohl's	"Back to School 99"	
2001	ERC		
2002	SBC Communications, Ameritech		
2002	Sears	"Winterizing	
2002	Go-Gurt		
2002	Fruit Roll-Ups		
2002	Sylvan Learning Center		
2002	Backyard Sports		
2002	Hey Arnold!: The Movie		
2003			Anti-drug public service announcement
2003	Home Depot		
2003	Go-Gurt	"Missing A Beat"	
2004	State Farm Insurance	"First Kiss"	
2004	Prego	"Grampa"	
2005			Anti-smoking public service announcement
2005	KFC	"Stop Everything"	
2005	Nintendo DS		
2008	Taco Bell	"Bunch of Beef"	
2009	Taco Bell	"It's All About the Roosevelts"	
2009	PetSmart		
2010	Axe		
2010	Dunkin' Donuts		

=== Voice work ===
Year	Title	Role	Notes
1992	Porco Rosso	Additional voices	2005 Disney English dub
1998	National Lampoon's Men in White	Additional voices	
1999	Michael Jordan: An American Hero	Additional voices	
2000	The Road to El Dorado	Additional voices	
2001	Monsters, Inc	Simulation Kid	
2002	Death to Smoochy	Additional voices	ADR
2002	Hey Arnold!: The Movie	Additional voices	
2002	Samurai Jack	Tall Kid, Little Kid	Episode: "Jack and the Scarab"
2003	Kangaroo Jack	Additional voices	ADR
2003	Agent Cody Banks	Additional voices	ADR
2003	Big Fish	Additional voices	ADR
2003	The Jungle Book 2	Additional voices	ADR
2003	Kingdom Hearts	Sora	Unaired television pilot
2004	Pinocchio 3000	Zack	
2006	Final Fantasy XII	Vaan	
2011	Dissidia 012 Final Fantasy	Vaan	
2016	Final Fantasy Explorers	Vaan	
2018	Dissidia Final Fantasy NT	Vaan	
