= Evermore (anthology) =

Anthology of short stories about or in honor of Edgar Allan Poe

- Dust-jacket illustration Evermore
- Author: edited by James Robert Smith and Stephen Mark Rainey
- Language: English
- Genre: horror short stories
- Publisher: Arkham House
- Publication date: 2006
- Publication place: United States
- Media type: Print (hardback)
- Pages: viii, 237 pp
- ISBN: 0-87054-185-4
- OCLC: 77516291

Evermore is an anthology of short stories about or in honor of Edgar Allan Poe and edited by James Robert Smith and Stephen Mark Rainey. It was released in 2006 by Arkham House in an edition of approximately 2,000 copies.

== Contents ==
Evermore contains the following tales:

1. "Introduction", by James Robert Smith and Stephen Mark Rainey
2. "All Beauty Sleeps", by Joel Lane
3. "The Clockwork Horror", by F. Gwynplaine MacIntyre
4. "The Impelled", by Gary Fry
5. "The Resurrections of Fortunato", by John Morressy
6. "They Call Me Eddie", by Rick Hautala & Thomas F. Monteleone
7. "Cloud by Night", by Melanie Tem
8. "Poe 103", by Ken Goldman
9. "From the Wall, a Whisper", by Kealan Patrick Burke
10. "When It Was Moonlight", by Manly Wade Wellman
11. "In Articulo Mortis", by Trey R. Baker
12. "Night Writing", by Charlee Jacob
13. "Of Persephone, Poe, and the Whisperer", by Tom Piccirilli
14. "An Author and His Character", by Vincent Starrett
15. "The Masque of Edgar Allan Poe", by Steve Rasnic Tem
16. "The White Cat", by Fred Chappell
17. Evermore Contributor Bios

== See also ==
- Edgar Allan Poe in popular culture
