= Jordan Rosenberg =

American screenwriter

- Born: Chicago, Illinois, United States
- Education: University of Michigan
- Occupation: Screenwriter

Jordan Rosenberg is an American television producer and writer. Rosenberg is also credited in the sound department and as the assistant director of the 2002 film American Jedi, a parody of Star Wars: Episode I – The Phantom Menace and American Pie.

Rosenberg was born in Chicago, Illinois.

== Career ==
After graduating from the University of Michigan earning joint degrees from the university's Film and Dramatic Writing programs, Rosenberg was awarded Michigan's Hopwood Award in Screenwriting. He then went on to work in the Drama Development departments at ABC and ABC Studios, then known as Touchstone, assisting in the launch of a number of the American Broadcasting Company's new television series for 2004, including Lost, Desperate Housewives and Grey's Anatomy and afterwards spent a year in the ABC Writers Fellowship program.

He then went on to become a member of the Lost crew, and wrote the season 3 episode "Par Avion" as well as the new media cross-over The Lost Experience. The Lost Experience was initially conceptualized by Lost showrunners Damon Lindelof and Carlton Cuse, who hired Rosenberg to write and design the game under the supervision of Lost's then Supervising Producer Javier Grillo-Marxuach. Rosenberg then went on to join the writing staff of Grillo-Marxuach's 2008 ABC Family series, The Middleman, writing two episodes: "The Boyband Superfan Interrogation" and "The Palindrome Reversal Palindrome," which became the de facto series finale when ABC Family reduced the order from thirteen episodes to twelve.

Rosenberg has also written for Medium, Falling Skies and multiple episodes of Elementary.
