= Spy Kids 3-D: Game Over (soundtrack) =

Spy Kids 3-D: Game Over (Music from the Motion Picture)

Soundtrack album by Robert Rodriguez
- Released: July 22, 2003
- Recorded: 2003
- Genres: Film soundtrack; pop rock
- Length: 47:06
- Label: Milan
- Producer: Robert Rodriguez

Robert Rodriguez film soundtrack chronology
Spy Kids 2: The Island of Lost Dreams (2002)	Spy Kids 3-D: Game Over (2003)	Once Upon a Time in Mexico (2003)

Spy Kids 3-D: Game Over (Music from the Motion Picture) is the soundtrack album to the 2003 film Spy Kids 3-D: Game Over directed by Robert Rodriguez, which is the third instalment in the Spy Kids franchise after Spy Kids (2001) and Spy Kids 2: The Island of Lost Dreams (2002).

Spy Kids 3-D was Rodriguez's first film as a sole composer, having previously co-composed its predecessor. The album also features four songs performed by Alexa Vega and Bobby Edner, who respectively played Carmen Cortez and Francis in the film. It was released through Milan Records on July 22, 2003.

== Development ==
Spy Kids 3-D: Game Over is Rodriguez's first solo credit as a film composer; he had previously been a co-composer for its predecessors. Rodriguez took on composing the film's score at the suggestion of the first film's co-composer Danny Elfman. After Elfman was unable to return for Spy Kids 2, Rodriguez ended up composing 60 percent of that film himself – with the rest of them being handled by co-composer John Debney – before going on to compose the full score for both Spy Kids 3-D and Once Upon a Time in Mexico (2003) as a learning experience.

Like the previous film, the scores for Spy Kids 3-D and Once Upon a Time in Mexico were recorded in Rodriguez's hometown of Austin, Texas, and performed by the local musicians to get a fresh feel for the music. The score emphasizes use of electronic, orchestral, symphonic and other musical elements. Rodriguez, a fan of Austin-based guitarist Stevie Ray Vaughan, used the same red 12-string Fender guitar that Vaughan played in Live Alive, which was gifted to him by the Weinstein brothers. On playing the guitar, Rodriguez wrote "you just put your fingers near it and whoa! I haven't changed the strings. One of these days, when I need a really good 12-string on a song, I'll pull this out. Keep the vibe."

The final mix of the recording happened during July 2003. The Texas Philharmonic Orchestra, conducted by George Oldziey and Rodriguez, performed the score, while actress Alexa Vega sung on four tracks: "Game Over" (and its remix), "Heart Drive" (with Bobby Edner) and "Isle of Dreams".

== Reception ==
Professional ratings
Review scores
Source	Rating
AllMusic	link
Filmtracks	2/5 stars
SoundtrackNet	2/5 stars

Heather Phares of AllMusic wrote "whether or not Spy Kids 3-D: Game Over is the weakest volume of the trilogy, its soundtrack is definitely the weakest score that the series has yet produced." Rafael Ruiz of Soundtrack.Net felt the soundtrack was lacking, writing "chances are that Rodriguez did much of it his own personal studio. Which is not said to be insulting, because I salute his ingenuity and I look forward to his much more traditional score for Once Upon A Time In Mexico." Christian Clemmensen of Filmtracks wrote "this third score plays like a 3-D film without the glasses, blurred at the edges and a potential headache if you pay too much attention to it." Andy Patrizio of IGN complimented the film's sound, calling the Rodriguez's score "well mixed" with the rest of the film's audio.

== Track listing ==
No.	Title	Artist(s)	Length
1.	"Game Over"	Alexa Vega	3:15
2.	"Thumb Thumbs"		0:59
3.	"Pogoland"		1:53
4.	"Robot Arena"		2:12
5.	"Metal Battle"		2:44
6.	"Toymaker"		3:34
7.	"Mega Racer"		5:57
8.	"Programmerz"		3:04
9.	"Bonus Life"		2:32
10.	"Cyber Staff Battle"		1:53
11.	"Tinker Toys"		1:21
12.	"Lava Monster Rock"		1:10
13.	"The Real Guy"		1:31
14.	"Orbit"		1:11
15.	"Welcome to the Game"		2:32
16.	"Heart Drive"	Bobby Edner; Vega	3:42
17.	"Game Over" (Level 5 Mix)	Vega	3:26
18.	"Isle of Dreams" (Cortez Mix)	Vega	4:10
Total length:			47:06

== Personnel ==
Credits adapted from liner notes:

- Music composer and producer – Robert Rodriguez
- Co-producers – George Oldziey, Carl Thiel
- Performer – Texas Philharmonic Digital Orchestra
- Orchestrators and conductors – Robert Rodriguez, George Oldziey
- Recording and mixing – Carl Thiel
- Mastering – Nancy Matter
- Executive producers – Emmanuel Chamboredon, Ian Hierons
- A&R coordinators – Nick Bobetsky, Russell Aiello
- Art direction – Jodi Tack

== Accolades ==
Award	Category	Recipient	Result
ASCAP Film and Television Music Awards	Top Box Office Films	Robert Rodriguez	Won
