= F. Gwynplaine MacIntyre =

American writer

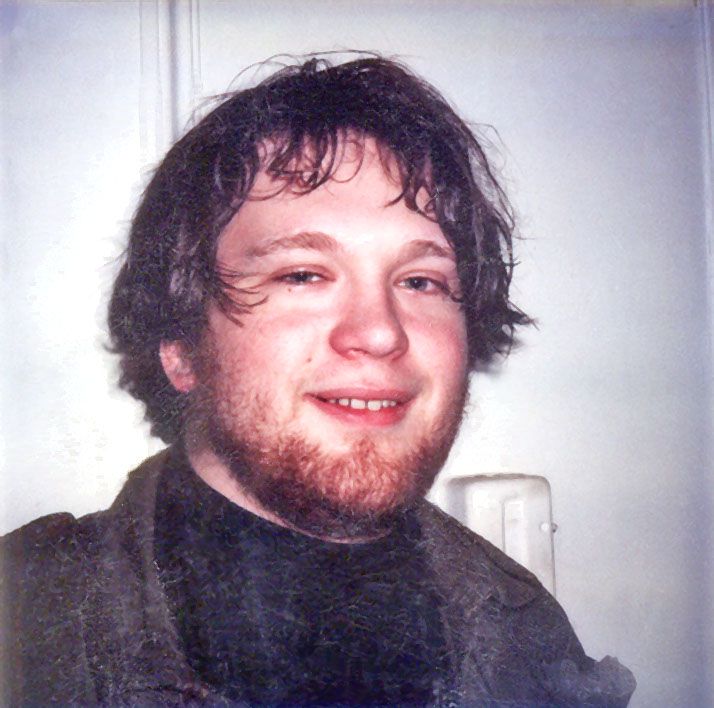
- Born: Paul Grant Jeffery; 9 March 1956; Manhattan, New York
- Died: 25 June 2010 (aged 54); Brooklyn, New York City
- Occupations: Author, illustrator
- Writing career
- Pen name: Victor Appleton (house pseudonym), F. Gwynplaine MacIntyre, Timothy/Tim C. Allen, Oleg V. Bredikhine
- Genre: Science fiction

Fergus or Feargus Gwynplaine MacIntyre (born Paul Grant Jeffery; 9 March 1956 – 25 June 2010), also known as Froggy, was a New York City-based journalist, novelist, poet and illustrator.

== Overview ==
MacIntyre's writings include the weird science fiction novel The Woman Between the Worlds and MacIntyre's Improbable Bestiary, a collection of his humor pieces and verse. As an uncredited "ghost" author, MacIntyre is known to have written or co-written several other books, including at least one novel in the Tom Swift IV series, The DNA Disaster, published as by "Victor Appleton" (a house pseudonym) but with MacIntyre's name on the acknowledgements page.

== Background ==
Little is known about MacIntyre's childhood. He was born Paul Jeffery in New York City, the son of Grant Turner Peter Jeffery, a Canadian-born editor and public relations executive, and Mathilde Barbara Mantano, the daughter of Italian immigrants. He had three brothers and two sisters.

Throughout his life, MacIntyre told various stories about his family, birthplace, and childhood that remain unsubstantiated, and which, after his death, his brother confirmed to be fictional: signs of mental illness had been evident from an early age. MacIntyre used a foreign accent and often told people he was orphaned by a Scottish family and raised in an Australian orphanage and a child labour camp. In addition to MacIntyre, he used the aliases Timothy/Tim C. Allen, Oleg V. Bredikhine, and the nickname Froggy. But a teenage acquaintance alleged that the young MacIntyre spoke then with a plain New York accent from Long Island or Queens, raising questions about his claims of foreign origin. Another acquaintance who knew MacIntyre in his twenties remembered that he still spoke with an American accent, and used the name Jeremy MacIntyre. An acquaintance remembers MacIntyre sharing the reason for the "Gwynplaine" in his name; it was, he said, from the film The Man Who Laughs, based on the Victor Hugo novel, in which the title character, Gwynplaine, has had a permanent smile surgically carved on his face. MacIntyre stated that he identified with Gwynplaine and thus chose the name as part of his own.

== Works ==
In the 1970s, MacIntyre worked for a Manhattan publisher of pornographic novels. Employees were paid $175 per week and expected to produce an entire pornographic novel in that time, as well as a chapter for a compilation-format pornographic book supposedly assembled from the cases of a Dr. Lamb.

Although MacIntyre professionally published many works of non-fiction and literature, he is best known as an author of genre fiction: specifically, science fiction, fantasy, horror and mystery stories. His short stories were published in Weird Tales, Analog, Asimov's Science Fiction, Amazing Stories, Absolute Magnitude, Interzone, The Strand Magazine and numerous anthologies, including Terry Carr's Best Science Fiction of the Year #10, Michael Reaves and John Pelan's mystery/horror anthology Shadows Over Baker Street, James Robert Smith and Stephen Mark Rainey's horror anthology Evermore, and Stephen Jones's The Mammoth Book of Best New Horror. For Mike Ashley's The Mammoth Book of Historical Detectives (1995), MacIntyre wrote "Death in the Dawntime", a locked room mystery (or rather, sealed cave mystery) set in Australia around 35,000 BC, which editor Mike Ashley suggests is the furthest in the past a historical whodunnit has been set.

A characteristic of MacIntyre's writing (both fiction and non-fiction) is his penchant for coining new words and resurrecting obscure words. Language authority William Safire acknowledged MacIntyre's neologism of "Clintonym" and quoted his historical etymology research.

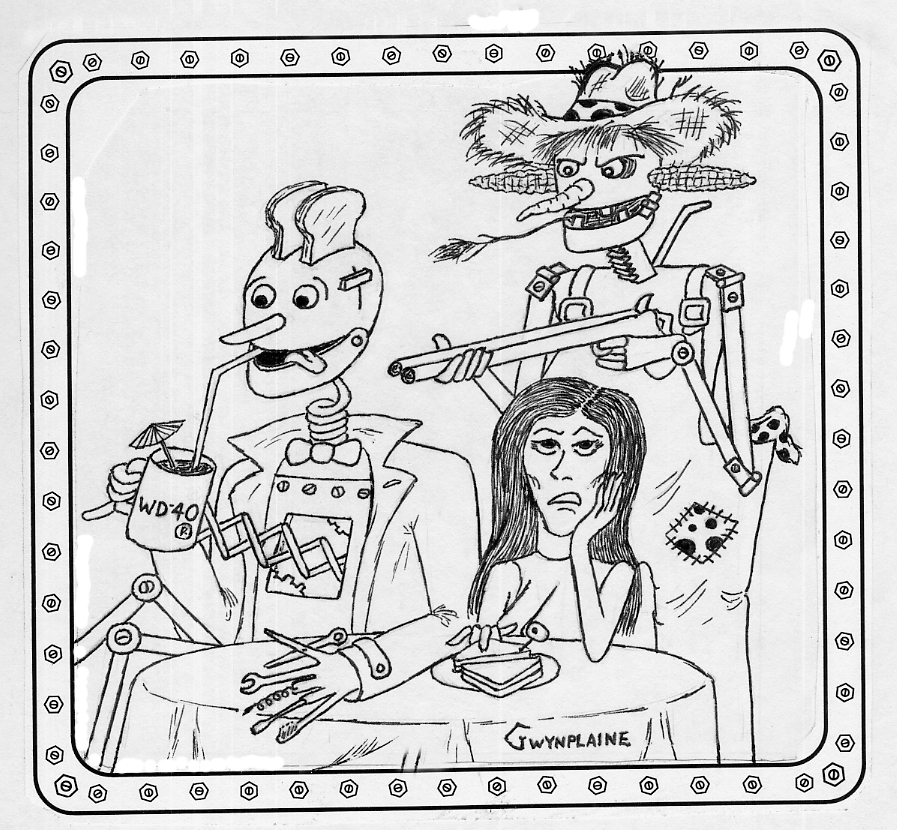
MacIntyre illustrated Ron Goulart's story "The Robot Who Came to Dinner" in Analog (July–August 2002).

In addition to publishing science fiction in Analog, MacIntyre also contributed to that magazine as an artist, illustrating his own stories and one by Ron Goulart.

MacIntyre wrote a considerable number of book reviews for The Magazine of Fantasy & Science Fiction. In the July 2003 issue of that magazine, MacIntyre mentioned that he was related to the wife of Scottish author Eric Linklater. It is unclear whether this was one of the many fabrications about his life that MacIntyre's brother later confirmed to be untrue. MacIntyre had previously stated (in interviews and at science-fiction conventions) that he was estranged from his family and did not acknowledge them. He had legally changed his name, officially filing a deed poll: "Fergus MacIntyre" was therefore his legal name but not his birth name. He had acknowledged that he took the name "Gwynplaine" from the protagonist of The Man Who Laughs, a novel by Victor Hugo.

MacIntyre claimed to have contributed substantial script material to a 2006 documentary about actress Theda Bara, The Woman with the Hungry Eyes: he claimed his contributions included the film's title and an interview he had conducted with author Fritz Leiber. He is only listed under the "Special Thanks" section of the credits; MacIntyre claimed to be contractually prevented from receiving a screenplay credit.

Among the genre film community, MacIntyre is notorious for writing over 1,600 reviews on the Internet Movie Database, many of which are fake, for films that have been lost for many years, and which he couldn't possibly have seen. On occasion, he would even admit this within the review.

== Assault charges ==
In 2000, MacIntyre was arrested after a neighbour said he duct-taped her to a chair, shaved her head, and spray-painted her black. He later pleaded guilty to third-degree misdemeanor assault.

== Death ==
On 25 June 2010, MacIntyre set his Brooklyn apartment on fire and his body was later found there.

For months preceding his death, MacIntyre had become more and more depressed and despondent. He sent mass emails to friends where he spoke of being troubled by his childhood. He described his family as "deeply evil people" and referenced suicide. He had also lost his night job as a printer and claimed to have health problems including synaesthesia. The day before his death, MacIntyre posted a review of the silent German science fiction film Metropolis (1927), titled "My favourite film, my last review" on IMDb. He concluded this review by writing, "Nitrate film stock doesn't last forever, and all good things come to a happy ending. This is my last review here. I'll keep watching movies, but other passions are important to me as well. Thank you, IMDb, and thank you to everyone who has read my reviews. I will happily rate 'Metropolis' a full 10 out of 10."

On 24 June 2010, police were called to MacIntyre's Bensonhurst apartment by a friend who had received the mass email which alluded to suicide. Six police officers forcibly removed MacIntyre from the apartment. He yelled that he wanted to die and take "everyone in the building down with me". He was taken to Coney Island Hospital for psychiatric evaluation and released hours later. MacIntyre returned to his apartment and sent off an angry mass email admonishing the person who called the police. At around 9:30 a.m. on 25 June, MacIntyre, who was a long time hoarder, lit the contents of his apartment on fire. The fire quickly engulfed the building and took sixty firefighters more than an hour to extinguish. MacIntyre's body was found among the burned debris. He was the only fatality in the fire as the other residents were quickly evacuated.

After his death, MacIntyre's brother came forward and stated that MacIntyre's life story was fabricated, but did not provide any details about his real-life story, save that they did have Scottish ancestry, or the reasons for his fabrications and affectations.

== Bibliography ==
=== Books ===
==== Novels ====
- The Woman Between the Worlds (1994, ISBN 0-440-50327-2 and 2000, ISBN 0-595-08884-8)

==== Poetry and miscellany ====
- MacIntyre's Improbable Bestiary (2005, ISBN 1-58715-472-2)

=== Short stories ===
==== Asimov's Science Fiction ====
- "For Cheddar or Worse" (volume 4 number 11, November 1980)
- "Martian Walkabout" (volume 5 number 13, December 1981) (reprinted in The Best Science Fiction of the Year #10 anthology edited by Terry Carr)
- "Isle Be Seeing You" (volume 6 number 4, April 1982)

==== Amazing Stories ====
- "The Empath" (Volume 60, Issue 1, Page 106 & 107, November 1985)
- "The Man Who Split in Twain" (May 1986)

==== Weird Tales ====
- "The Ones Who Turn Invisible" (#293, 1988)
- "Beddy-Bye" (Summer, 1998)

==== Absolute Magnitude ====
- "The Minds Who Jumped" (Spring 1995)

==== Albedo One ====
- "An Actor Prepares" (#20, 1999)

==== Analog Science Fiction and Fact ====
- "OOPS!" (March 1991)
- "Teeny-Tiny Techno-Tactics" (March 1997)
- "Time Lines" (June 1999)
- "A Real Bang-Up Job" (July 2000)
- "'Put Back That Universe!'" (October 2000)
- "Schrödinger's Cat-Sitter" (July 2001)
- "A Deadly Medley of Smedley" (April 2003)
- "Annual Annular Annals" (January 2004)

==== Interzone ====
- "Sundowner Sheila" (February 2006)

==== The Strand Magazine ====
- "Down the Garden Path" (February 2008)

==== Esli) ====
- "Random" (July 2008)
- "Smart Fashions" (June 2009; cover story)
- "Boarder Incidence" (February 2010)

==== Space and Time ====
- "Another Fine Messiah" (#110, Spring 2010)

==== S-F Magazine ====
- "The Adventure of Exham Priory" (May 2010)
