= Jake Smollett =

American actor (born 1989)

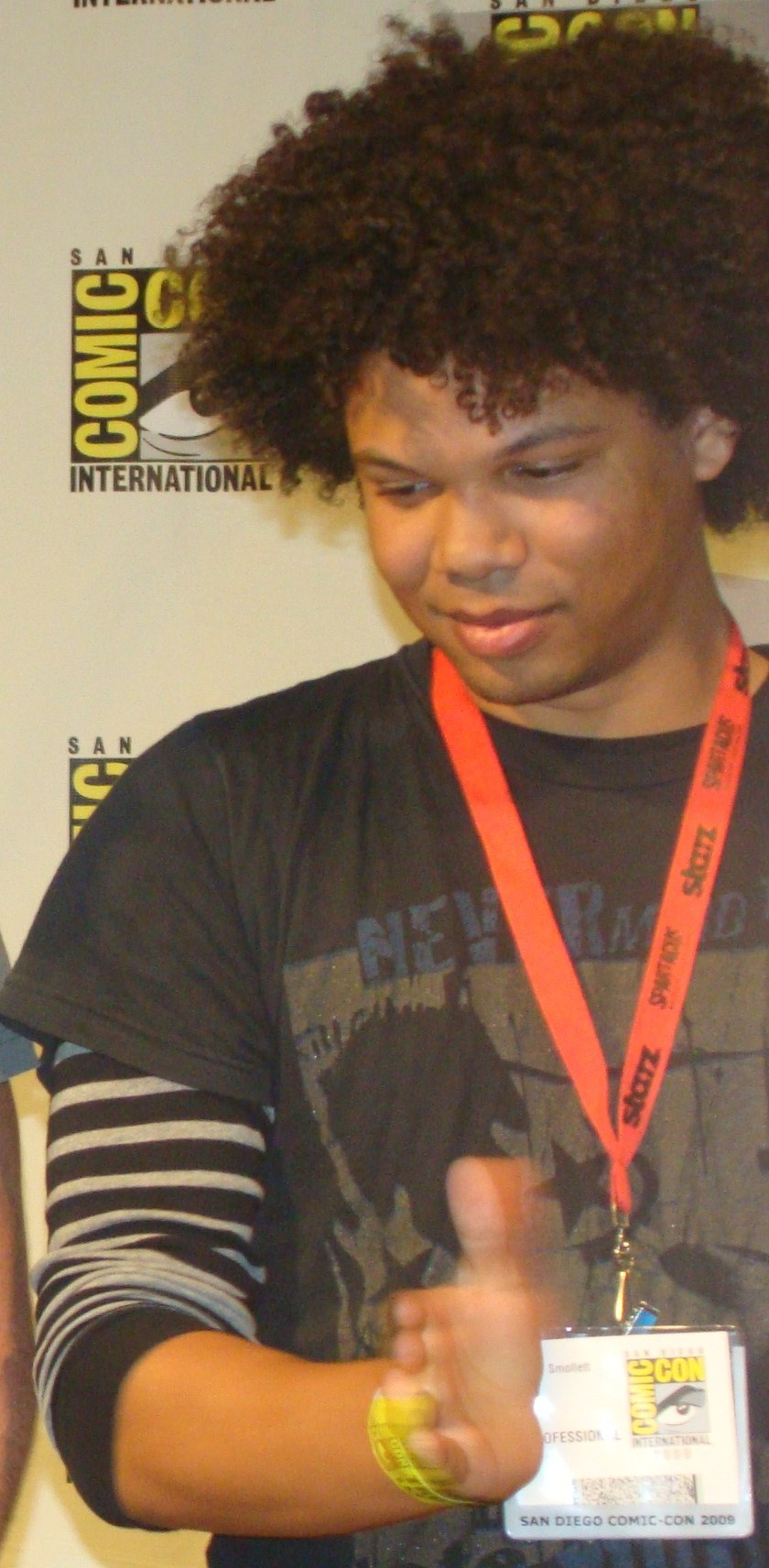
- Smollett at the 2009 Comic-Con
- Born: July 29, 1989 (age 37); New York City, U.S.
- Occupation: Actor
- Years active: 1992–present
- Relatives: Jussie Smollett (brother); Jurnee Smollett (sister)

Jake Smollett (born July 29, 1989) is an American actor and cooking personality.

== Early life and career ==
Smollett was born in New York City to a family of actors, the son of Janet (née Harris) and Joel Smollett. His father’s family immigrated from Russia and Poland, and his mother is African American. Smollett began his career as a diaper model. His first role in a scripted series was in Hangin' with Mr. Cooper. He then starred alongside his five brothers and sisters in the ABC sitcom, On Our Own. Smollett also starred alongside his sister Jurnee Smollett as Samuel L. Jackson's son in the critically acclaimed feature film Eve's Bayou, directed by Kasi Lemmons. He was in ABC Family's The Middleman. Jake portrayed Noser, a character derived from Javier Grillo-Marxuach's comic book. The entire cast of The Middleman sat on the panel for Comic-Con in July 2009.

In 2016, Smollett joined his five siblings—brothers Jojo Smollett, Jussie Smollett, Jocqui Smollett and sisters Jazz Smollett and Jurnee Smollett—on Food Network to cook family-style meals every Saturday on Smollett Eats. He also appeared as a guest judge on Food Network's hit show Chopped Junior. In 2017, Jake joined Rachael Ray on The Rachael Ray Show all season long for cooking segments.

In 2019, Smollet launched the lifestyle and home makeover series Living by Design on CLEO TV, appearing alongside his sister, designer and stylist Jazz Smollet. The show centers on home renovation, interior design and meal preparation segments tailored to each household. The program mixes cooking and design in the same show.

In recent years, Jake Smollett has continued his work in the food and lifestyle space, leveraging his experience as a cooking personality to explore new ventures. In late 2024 he participated in an extended interview discussing the release of the family cookbook The Family Table, which he co-authored with his siblings and was published in 2018, emphasizing how food and family heritage drive his current career focus.

== Acting roles ==
- Hangin' with Mr. Cooper (1992), Jake (himself)
- On Our Own (1994–1995), Joc Jerrico
- A Guy Named Max (1996) Clarence Whitmoore
- Eve's Bayou (1997), Poe Batiste
- The Middleman (2008–2009), Noser
- Pitch This (2009), Luke
- Living by Design with Jake and Jazz (2019), Jake (himself)
