= Nosferatu (graphic novel) =

2010 graphic novel

Publication information
- Publisher: Viper Comics
- Publication date: 2010
- No. of issues: 1

Creative team
- Written by: Christopher Howard Wolf (script)
- Artist: Justin Wayne (pencils/inks)
- Colorist: Sal Nieto

Nosferatu is a 2010 graphic novel based on the 1922 film of the same name, modernized by Christopher Howard Wolf and Justin Wayne, and published by Viper Comics.

== Synopsis ==
Tommy Hutter is a female photographer from the United States who goes to Germany to photograph an ancient, secluded castle. While there, she meets the vampire Count Orlok who lives in the ruined building. Orlok becomes infatuated by a picture of Tommy's girlfriend, Elle, which is on her laptop computer. Upon leaving Germany, Tommy comes to discover that Orlok has traveled to the United States as well, and she must try to save Elle from his clutches.

== Reception ==
Prior to the release of the graphic novel, Bloody Disgusting questioned the inclusion of new characters in an adaptation of the classic Nosferatu story. The PullBox noted that the protagonists, Tommy and Elle, are archetypal, but stated that they are "not driven by stereotype". Additionally, the website described the graphic novel as a strong "pulp" adaptation.

In an interview, the author stated that while the characters were conceived of as lesbians, there was no initial agenda behind the decision. However, he also noted that the change lent a new level of horror to the unwanted advances of Count Orlok.

== See also ==
- Lesbian vampire
