= Wraith (Zak-Del) =

Fictional character

- Cover art for Annihilation Conquest: Wraith #1. Featuring Zak-Del. Art by Clint Langley.

Publication information
- Publisher: Marvel Comics
- First appearance: Annihilation Conquest: Wraith #1 (June 2007)
- Created by: Javier Grillo-Marxuach; Kyle Hotz

In-story information
- Alter ego: Zak-Del
- Species: Kree
- Team affiliations: Kree Underground; Nameless Kree; Dark Guardians
- Notable aliases: Pale Rider, Kree with no name, Paleface
- Abilities: Utilizes a polymorphic weapon; Superhuman physical abilities; High pain tolerance; Via Exolon parasites: Soul and energy absorption; Longevity via agelessness

Wraith (Zak-Del) is a fictional character appearing in American comic books published by Marvel Comics. Created by Javier Grillo-Marxuach and Kyle Hotz, Wraith first appears in the prologue of Annihilation: Conquest as a vision, with his first physical appearance being in Annihilation Conquest: Wraith #1.

Zak-Del is a Kree whose father, Sim-Del, was killed by the Kree after he built a powerful source of light. He was subsequently adopted by the Nameless, a population of Kree who serve as the host of the parasitic Exolons. It is later revealed that the Exolons are a type of symbiote who were abandoned by their creator, Knull. The character has also appeared in the Guardians of the Galaxy animated series.

== Publication history ==
Wraith first appeared in Annihilation: Conquest: Wraith #1 (2007) and was created by Javier Grillo-Marxuach and Kyle Hotz. Wraith returned in Donny Cates and Geoff Shaw's 2019 relaunch of Guardians of the Galaxy.

== Fictional character biography ==
Zak-Del is the son of Kree scientist Sim-Del, who created a power source sufficient to "light an entire galaxy". The Kree banish Sim-Del, but he continues his work, using the power source to turn a barren planetoid into a paradise. After Sim-Del is killed by Kree forces, Zak-Del is sent off on an escape ship. Zak-Del is later found and adopted by the Nameless, an offshoot of the Kree whose bodies were invaded by parasitic Exolons. Zak-Del is infected with the Exolon and swears revenge on the man who killed his parents. He defeats the leader of the Nameless, then steals their ship and polymorphic weapon for his cause.

=== Guardians of the Galaxy ===
After Gamora kills Thanos, Wraith attends Thanos's funeral and witnesses Starfox showing all the guests a recording of Thanos stating that he uploaded his consciousness into another body before his death. While Wraith watches everyone angrily debate whether Thanos was telling the truth, they are attacked by the Black Order, who take Thanos's body. Wraith and the others are saved by Gladiator and the Shi'ar and are told that Thanos may have transferred his consciousness into Gamora's body. Wraith brings up the issue of the Black Order, but Starfox assures him that they are searching for them and Nebula states that the team should track down Nova to find Gamora's location.

Wraith tracks down Knull, a primordial deity who created the Klyntar and the Exolon, to be freed from the Exolon's influence. He discovers that the Exolon are discarded offshoots created by Knull, who removes the Exolons from his body. Wraith is mortally wounded by Knull, but discovers that Knull has an opposite, a god of light. He travels to Earth to tell Eddie Brock this information before dying.

== Powers and abilities ==
Wraith is an experienced fighter and wields a polymorphic weapon which can take on a variety of forms, including a gun, a whip, a blade, and binoculars. As a Kree, Wraith possesses greater natural attributes than a human and is resistant to poisons, toxins, and disease. Due to the Exolon parasites that infect and maintain his body, he possesses enhanced speed, strength and agility greater than a normal Kree, as well as a healing factor and increased tolerance to pain. By summoning swarms of Exolon, he can strike fear into his opponents and absorb their souls.

== In other media ==
=== Television ===
Wraith appears in Guardians of the Galaxy, voiced by Jeff Bennett. This version's father was killed after he chose to have himself and a weapon he had created be destroyed by a black hole rather than be used by Ronan the Accuser. Ever since, Zak-Del blamed Gamora for what happened, as she had brought his father to Ronan, and swore revenge.

=== Video games ===
- Wraith appears in Marvel: Avengers Alliance 2.
- Wraith appears as an NPC in Disney Infinity 2.0 and Disney Infinity 3.0.
- Wraith appears as a skin in Minecraft as part of the Guardians of the Galaxy DLC.
- Wraith appears in Marvel's Guardians of the Galaxy.

== Collected editions ==
Title	Material collected	Published date	ISBN
Annihilation: Conquest Book 2	Annihilation: Conquest - Wraith #1-4 and Nova (vol. 4) #4-7, Annihilation: Conquest #1-6	January 2009	978-0785127178
Annihilation: Conquest Omnibus	Annihilation: Conquest - Wraith #1-4 and Nova (vol. 4) #1-12, Annual #1, Annihilation: Conquest #1-6; Annihilation: Conquest Prologue #1; Annihilation: Conquest - Star-Lord #1-4; Annihilation: Conquest - Quasar #1-4; Annihilation Saga	June 2015	978-0785192701
Venomnibus by Cates & Stegman	Web of Venom: Wraith #1 and Venom (vol. 4) #1-35, Venom Annual #1, Web of Venom: Ve'Nam #1, Web of Venom: Carnage Born #1, Absolute Carnage #1-5, King in Black #1-5; material from Free Comic Book Day 2019 (Spider-Man/Venom) #1, Free Comic Book Day 2020 (Spider-Man/Venom) #1, Incoming #1, Carnage: Black, White & Blood #2	July 2022	978-1302946418
