= Varsity Fanclub =

American boy band

Varsity Fan Club
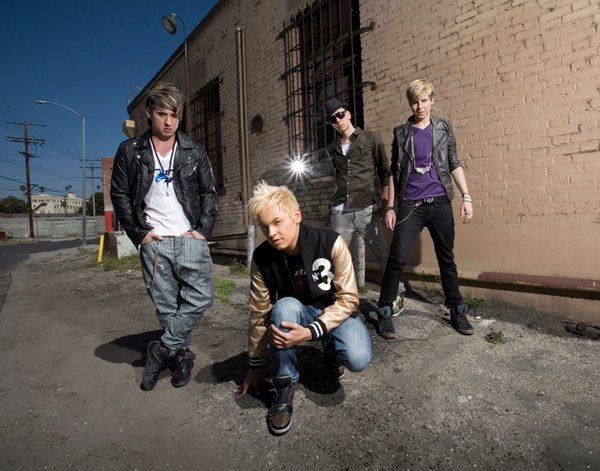
- Varsity Fan Club in 2011

Background information
- Also known as: VFC
- Origin: Los Angeles, California
- Genres: Pop, R&B, Rock, Hip Hop music
- Years active: 2007–2013
- Label: Capitol Records
- Past members: Drew Ryan Scott; Jayk Purdy; Thomas "T.C." Carter; Thomas Fiss; Bobby Edner; David Lei Brandt

Varsity Fanclub was an American boy band, formed in 2007 by Capitol Records.

== Career ==
The band, consisting of Drew Ryan Scott, David Lei Brandt, Bobby Edner, Jayk Purdy and Thomas Fiss, was formed through a band casting in 2007. Their first major performance was at the well-known Macy's Thanksgiving Day Parade in front of over 40 million television viewers, followed by an appearance on the ABC Family series The Middleman. They then released their first single on Capitol Records entitled Future Love (written by Ryan Tedder and Evan Bogart; produced by the producers of OneRepublic) and ended up directly into Radio Disney's playlist and The N's video rotation. After a US tour as opening act for Rihanna, the Pussycat Dolls and Jesse McCartney in 2008 and 2009, the band parted ways with their former management and their record company. After this separation, Fiss departed as well. The band changed members and through another audition found Thomas "T.C." Carter to replace him. After a short finding phase, the band decided on a European management and worked on new songs and choreographies and prepared for their first tour in Europe. They also released a download single entitled Spank That which was promoted with both a video contest and a specially made up crap dance which they performed with Miley Cyrus. In the summer of 2010, Varsity Fanclub went on a three-month promotional tour in Germany, during which they also released their first physical single on the European market entitled I'm Your Guy. During this promotional tour, they appeared in television programs such as ZDF-Fernsehgarten or VIVA Live as well as at family festivals such as REWE Family or the Toggo Tour of Super RTL.

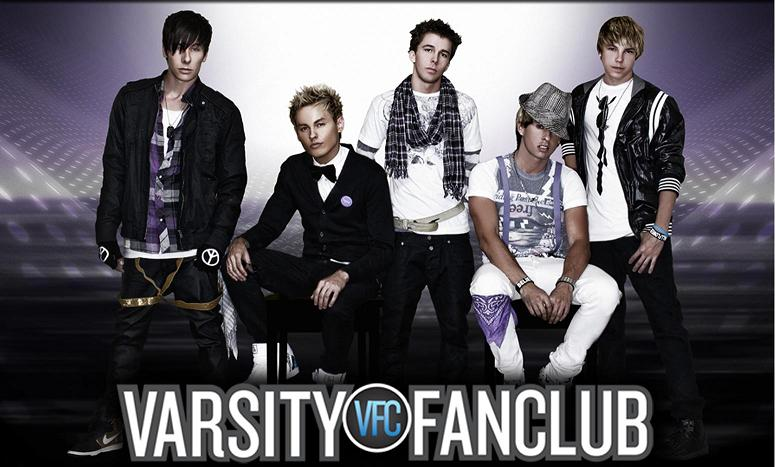
Varsity Fanclub

In April 2011, the band parted ways with Edner. In the summer of 2011, the band toured Germany again and completed numerous festival shows. In autumn 2011 the new single Opera and the debut album were released. In September 2011 the band parted ways with their German manager Philipp Hallenberger. In April 2012, Brandt announced that he was no longer part of the band as he was going on a two-year tour as one of Lady Gaga's dancers. After Brandt and Edner split, Purdy, Scott and Carter employed two new band members. They found this in early 2013 with Blake English and Devin Fox.

== Members ==
- Drew Ryan Scott (June 17) from Lafayette, Louisiana, is also a songwriter and producer, and worked with for the Jonas Brothers on songs like "Hey You" and Miley Cyrus on the hit single "Gonna Get This". He also lent his singing voice to actor Sterling Knight in the musical film StarStruck and to voice actor Bryce Papenbrook for the character Adrien Agreste/Cat Noir in the musical animation film Ladybug & Cat Noir: The Movie.
- Jayk Purdy (August 7) from Las Vegas, Nevada, played in school bands since he was a little boy.
- Thomas "T.C." Carter (May 3) from Naples, Florida, won various dance competitions and was in commercials (including those of Nike, Microsoft, Nintendo) and the Nickelodeon teen series iCarly & Victorious. T.C. was in the band since 2009 after Thomas Fiss left the band.
- Bobby Edner (October 5) from Los Angeles, California, played Ari in TV series such as Charmed, films such as Spy Kids 3-D: Game Over and commercials for companies, including Taco Bell, Dunkin' Donuts, and Axe. He also is the English voice for the Final Fantasy character Vaan in Final Fantasy XII.
- Thomas Fiss (December 7) from San Diego, California, acted at the age of 12 in the musical The Full Monty in San Diego and on Broadway. He was a founding member and left the band in 2009.
- David Lei Brandt (November 29) from Evansville, Indiana, played among others in Pirates of the Caribbean: Dead Man's Chest and is well known among youth in the United States as the presenter of Toontown on the Disney Channel. He announced on April 12, 2012, via his Twitter account that he was no longer a member of Varsity Fanclub.

== Discography ==
Year	Album
2009	Varsity Fanclub: Released: May 26, 2009; Record Label: Capitol Records

=== Singles ===
Year	Song	Position In Chart		Album
Year	Song	U.S. Billboard Pop 100 Airplay	U.S. Pop 100	Album
2008	"Future Love"	62	90	Varsity Fanclub
2009	"Zero"	—	—	Varsity Fanclub
2010	"Spank That"	—	—	
2010	"I'm Your Guy"	—	—	
"—" denotes the single failed to chart or wasn't released

|2011 |"Opera" |— |— |- | colspan="6" align="center" |"—" denotes the single failed to chart or wasn't released |}

== Awards ==
- 2010: Children's Campus Award in the category "Super-Band 2010"
- 2011: Winner of the Boyband 2011 Award at Kindercampus
