= Spy Kids 2: The Island of Lost Dreams (soundtrack) =

Spy Kids 2: The Island of Lost Dreams (Music from the Dimension Motion Picture)

Soundtrack album by Robert Rodriguez and John Debney
- Released: August 6, 2002
- Recorded: June–July 2002
- Studios: Georgetown High School, Austin, Texas
- Genres: Film soundtrack; rock; pop
- Length: 44:04
- Label: Milan
- Producer: Robert Rodriguez

Robert Rodriguez film soundtrack chronology
Spy Kids (2001)	Spy Kids 2: The Island of Lost Dreams (2002)	Spy Kids 3-D: Game Over (2003)

Spy Kids 2: The Island of Lost Dreams (Music from the Dimension Motion Picture) is the soundtrack to the Spy Kids 2: The Island of Lost Dreams, which is the second installment in the Spy Kids franchise and the sequel to Spy Kids. The film score was co-written by director Robert Rodriguez and the predecessor's composer John Debney, which infuses a mix of rock, pop, and indie rock, and songs performed by Alan Cumming and Alexa Vega. The score was released through Milan Records on August 6, 2002.

== Development ==
Rodriguez wanted Danny Elfman to compose the sequel, as he was one of the composers for the predecessor, but Elfman denied due to the large orchestral score that demanded heavy workload. Rodriguez then took over the composing duties and shared credits with composer John Debney, who also worked on the predecessor. He insisted the executives at Miramax and Dimension Films to record the score at Austin, Texas, contrary to the studio and sound stage recording in mainstream Hollywood films. The post-production supervisor Brian McNulty scouted locations and as the team wanted to record the score during June–July 2002, summer school became a problem, which led them to venture out on some of the surrounding school districts.

While Rodriguez and McNulty listed on locations such as Round Rock, Cedar Park, and Leander School District due to its "excellent" infrastructure, they ultimately settled on Georgetown High School due to its seating capacity that occupies 1,200 people and had the requisite high ceiling and acoustical design necessary for the recording process. McNulty said, "What we were doing for four straight days was more akin to film production, with trucks, crew, craft services, and guys with walkie-talkies, the whole 'recording, rolling, quiet on the set' sort of thing." The second step was gathering an orchestra of 74 players from Austin, San Antonio and Houston and bringing a mobile studio from San Diego. Handling the logistics of the orchestra, were done by music contractor Tom Hale and Texas-based George Oldzeiy did the orchestration.

McNulty recalled a demo session in late April, and "and although it wasn't at the right facility and it wasn't the bulk of the music", the team recorded only 8 minutes of the score, for convincing the studio personnel to conduct the recording at Texas. The executives at Miramax were concerned as recording outside a studio was never done before, but "once they saw that the players were good and the music sounded great they said 'go for it.'" The recording happened for four days and came within the right budget and time, just before the final leg of post-production happened. McNulty said that, "quite frankly there was no margin for error, but everything went perfectly, with not a single minute of technical downtime" which he described something "pretty remarkable".

Elfman's song "Floop's Dream" performed by Alan Cumming was featured in this film, with additional arrangements by Rodriguez. Alexa Vega also performed the song "Isle of Dreams"; the song "Oye Como Spy" performed by Los Lobos for the first film's soundtrack, was also included, despite not being in the soundtrack. In the liner notes, Rodriguez said that the score was meant to pay homage to the music of Ray Harryhausen's films composed by Bernard Herrmann, particularly The 7th Voyage of Sinbad and Jason and the Argonauts.

== Track listing ==
No.	Title	Music	Artist(s)	Length
1.	"The Juggler"	Robert Rodriguez		2:08
2.	"Spy Ballet"	Rodriguez		3:51
3.	"Magna Men"	John Debney		1:49
4.	"Treehouse"	Rodriguez; Debney		2:03
5.	"R.A.L.P.H."	Rodriguez		1:07
6.	"Floop's Dream"	Rodriguez	Alan Cumming	1:11
7.	"Escape from Dragon-spy"	Debney		1:58
8.	"Spy-parents"	Rodriguez; Debney		0:57
9.	"Island of Lost Dreams"	Rodriguez		1:04
10.	"Donnagon's Big Office / The Giggles"	Rodriguez		2:35
11.	"Mysterious Volcano Island"	Debney		2:03
12.	"Romero's Zoo Too"	Rodriguez; Debney		2:47
13.	"Mothership / SpyGrandparents"	Rodriguez		3:06
14.	"Magna Racers"	Rodriguez; Debney		1:42
15.	"Aztec Treasure Room"	Rodriguez		2:09
16.	"Skeletons"	Debney		3:40
17.	"Creature Battle"	Debney		1:48
18.	"Romero's Creatures / SpyBeach"	Rodriguez		1:19
19.	"SpyDad vs. SpyDad / Romero's Gift"	Rodriguez		2:24
20.	"Isle of Dreams"	Rodriguez	Alexa Vega	4:13
Total length:				43:54

== Reception ==
Mark Hockley of Music Web International gave two-and-a-half out of five, saying "this is a score that has a certain shallowness, although it never really intends itself to be taken too seriously and some may find that quite refreshing. For myself, while generally I found it to be mildly diverting, I was always aware that this was a soundtrack that is entirely disposable." Heather Phares of AllMusic rated three out of five and said that the composers "take a very playful, stylized, Danny Elfman-esque approach, infusing it with Latin twists, rock energy and electronic whimsy".

Christian Clemmensen of Filmtracks wrote "The interesting aspect of Spy Kids 2 is that Rodriguez's cues, while not possessing the same complexity of sound as Debney's music, are structurally very similar to Debney's style. It's difficult to say if that is because Rodriguez's talents in composition are particularly strong or if Debney's adaptation and expansion of Rodriguez's ideas is that precise [...] in any event, the teenage buyers targeted by both this film and soundtrack will mostly likely appreciate the James Bond-style song with actress Alexa Vega's vocals at the end. For film score fans, you will have heard this Debney music before (countless times), and if you value creativity in your children's adventure scores, the first Spy Kids score is the better choice."

== Personnel ==
Credits adapted from liner notes:

- Music composers – John Debney, Robert Rodriguez
- Music producer – Robert Rodriguez
- Orchestrators – Bill Liston, Brad Dechter, Chris Klatman, Don Nemitz, Frank Bennett, George Oldziey, Gordon Goodwin, Ira Hearshon, Jeff Atmajian, Mike Watts, Pete Anthony
- Conductor – Pete Anthony
- Sound engineer – Wolfgang Amadeus
- Recording and mixing – Alan Meyerson
- Score editor – Tom Carlson
- Executive producers – Emmanuel Chamboredon, Ian Hierons, Keith Walner
- Art direction – Jodi Tack

Instruments

- Cello – Carolyn Hagler, David Mollenauer
- Clarinet – Ilya Shterenberg
- Electronics – Wolfgang Amadeus
- Flute – Adrienne Inglis
- Harp – Elaine Barber
- Horns – Chris Komer, Margaret Ayer
- Percussion – Thomas Burritt
- Synthesizers and loops – John Sponsler, Tom Gire
- Trumpet – Gary Slechta
- Viola – Laura Renz, Marcia Ryan, Martha Carapetyan, Shawn Somerville
- Violin – Adrianna Hulscher, Alex Palamidis, Amy Sauers, Anne Rardin, Bruce Colson, Helen Bravenec, Jennifer Bourianoff, Karen Sanno, Karen Stiles, Paul Robertson, Wallace DePue

== Accolades ==
Award	Category	Recipient	Result
ASCAP Film and Television Music Awards	Top Box Office Films	John Debney	Won
