= The Day the World Ended =

2001 television film

- DVD cover
- Screenplay by: Max Enscoe; Annie deYoung
- Story by: Brian King
- Directed by: Terence Gross
- Starring: Nastassja Kinski; Randy Quaid; Bobby Edner
- Theme music composer: Charles Bernstein
- Country of origin: United States
- Original language: English

Production
- Producers: Lou Arkoff; Colleen Camp; Stan Winston
- Cinematography: Mark Vargo
- Editor: Stephen Mark
- Running time: 91 minutes
- Production company: Creature Features Productions

Original release
- Network: Cinemax
- Release: November 23, 2001

The Day the World Ended is a 2001 American science fiction/horror television film and is the fourth in the Creature Features series broadcast on Cinemax. It stars Nastassja Kinski, Randy Quaid, and Bobby Edner.

While not being a direct remake of the 1955 film with a similar title (Day the World Ended), it utilizes the original film by showing segments on a TV seen within the story and showing that the VHS video box cover as part of the child's interest in aliens. Some scenes were filmed in Wrightwood, California.

== Plot ==
Dr. Jennifer Stillman, a psychologist from New York, relocates to the quiet town of Sierra Vista, Nevada, to work as a school therapist. Her arrival is marked by immediate friction with the local authorities, and on her first day, an unsettling encounter with a peculiar boy at a school crosswalk leaves her feeling uneasy. This initial incident only foreshadows a series of troubling events that await her. She soon finds herself at odds with Principal Ed Turner, who openly disapproves of her therapeutic approach, and notices that most of the townspeople are cold or even outright unfriendly towards her. Sheriff Ken adds to her discomfort, subjecting her to scrutiny as if testing her resilience as a newcomer.

Jennifer is baffled by the town’s pervasive suspicion. At first, she suspects her outsider status is to blame, but she gradually senses a more sinister undercurrent. The deeper she probes into Sierra Vista’s social fabric, the more she suspects the townspeople are guarding a secret they will go to great lengths to keep hidden.

Matters become more complicated when young Ben McCann-Miller begins therapy with her. Ben, whose mother died under mysterious circumstances and who now lives with his adoptive father, believes with absolute certainty that he is half-alien and that his extraterrestrial father will eventually take him to another world. Both Ben and his adoptive father, the town physician Dr. Michael McCann, are withdrawn, and Dr. McCann is skeptical of therapy. As Jennifer becomes more acquainted with the town’s residents, she encounters increasingly bizarre situations. She learns that Ben harbors painful secrets about his past and that the townspeople are especially wary of outsiders who ask too many questions. Her investigation into a series of odd occurrences causes her to consider, against her better judgment, that Ben’s wild story about his alien heritage might contain some truth.

Panic grips Sierra Vista when a mysterious creature begins killing residents. The number of victims steadily increases, intensifying the town’s fear. Ultimately, Jennifer uncovers that the so-called “alien” is targeting those complicit in Ben’s mother’s murder— a crime committed because the townspeople believed she was a dangerous psychic. Although they recognized that Ben possessed the same abilities, they stopped short of harming him. In the end, it is revealed that the “alien” is not an extraterrestrial being, but a tangible manifestation of Ben’s own traumatized subconscious, shaped by the secrets and tragedies that have haunted him.

== Cast ==
- Nastassja Kinski as Dr. Jennifer Stillman
- Randy Quaid as Dr. Michael McCann
- Bobby Edner as Ben Miller/McCann
- Harry Groener as Sheriff Ken
- Lee de Broux as Cook Harlan (as Lee DeBroux)
- Stephen Tobolowsky as Principal Ed Turner
- Debra Christofferson as Nurse Della Divelbuss
- Nik Dressbach as Buzzcut
- Brandon de Paul as Frankie Carter
- Kate Fuglei as Waitress Carlita
- Neil Vipond as The Judge
- Brian Steele as The Creature
- David Getz as Deputy #1
- Kathryn Fiore as Maggie Miller
- David Doty as Nice Guy
- Samantha Sansonetti as Crosswalk Child #1

== Production ==
Produced by Stan Winston, Colleen Camp and Samuel Z. Arkoff's son, Lou Arkoff, as a series of cable TV movies which remade many movies originally by American International Pictures, although this film has little in similarity to the original, Day the World Ended, other than its title, and some clips from the first film seen on a TV and the VHS video box cover of the film as part of the child's interest in aliens. another reason Stan Winston remade this film was he'd had worked with AIP in their last years providing special effects for The Bat People (1974) and to start a toy line which included action figures from the film.

== Release ==
The film was released on Cinemax on November 23, 2001.

== Reception ==
One review said, "It may be far from what Nastassja Kinski is capable of, but DAY THE WORLD ENDED is a fine film in its own right. Genuinely creepy and a real find for people who can't decide between psychological terror and popcorn-munching exploitation.". Moria gave the movie 2 out of 5 stars, finding the movie the dullest of the Creature Feature Series.
