= Derek Kirk Kim =

Comics artist and filmmaker (born 1970s)

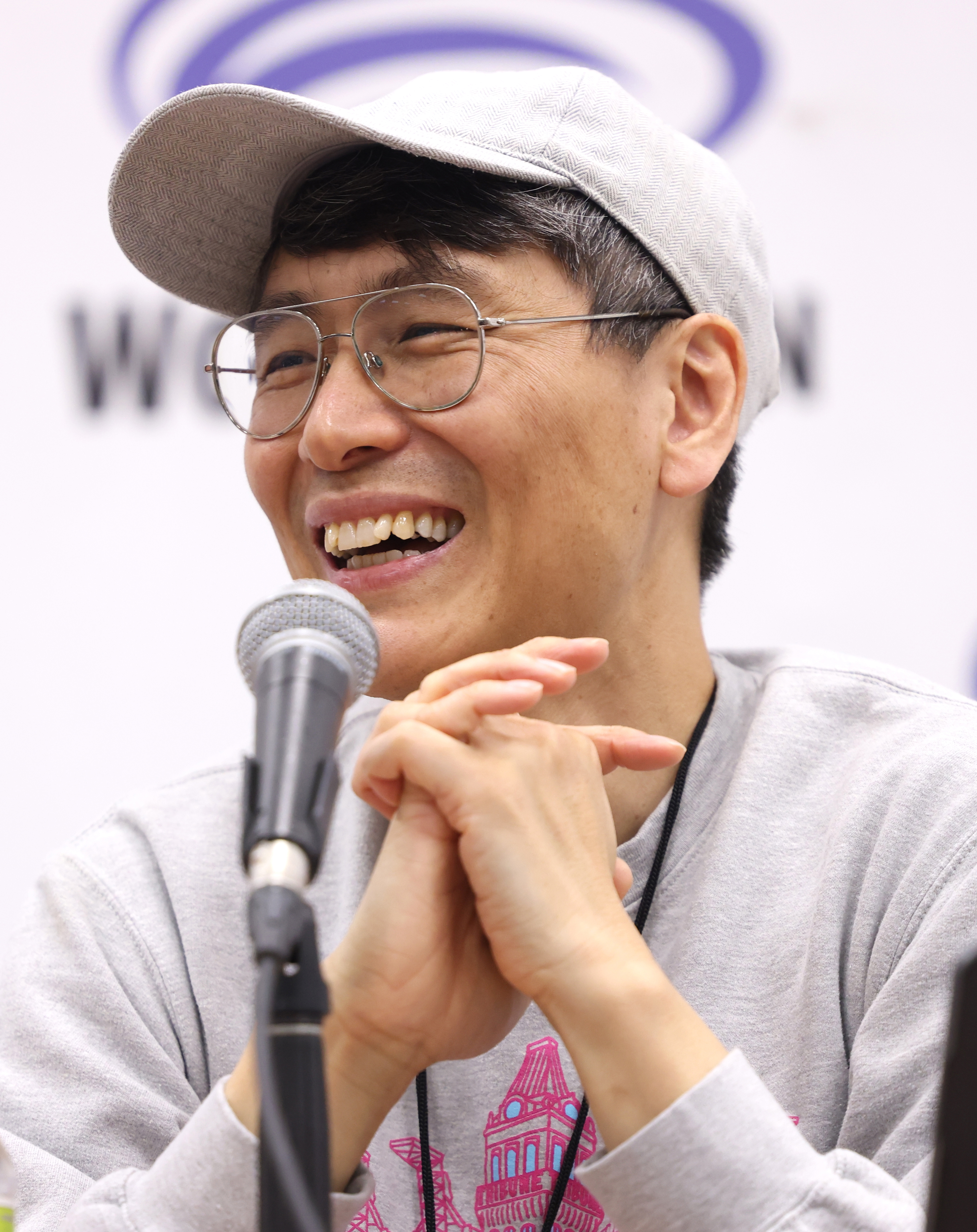
- Kim in 2025
- Born: 1974/1975 (age 51–52) South Korea
- Areas: Writer, Artist
- Notable works: Same Difference (2003); The Eternal Smile (2009)
- Collaborators: Gene Luen Yang
- Awards: Ignatz Award (2003); Eisner Award (2004, 2010); Harvey Award (2004)

Derek Kirk Kim (born 1974/1975) is a Korean-American comics artist and filmmaker.

== Personal life ==
Derek Kirk Kim was born in South Korea in 1974 or 1975, and moved to the United States at age eight. From Pacifica, California, by 2005 he was living in San Francisco. There, Kim attended the Academy of Art University where he majored in illustration, though he later wished he had attended "a regular school so I could have gotten a more rounded education and been exposed to different subjects."

== Career ==
Kim began publishing semi-autobiographical serialized short stories on his website, lowbright.com, in 2000. Some of those stories from 2000 to 2003 were collected by Kim and published in Same Difference and Other Stories, an award-winning publication that he later said kick-started his professional career. Through the early 2010s, Kim described himself as being singularly focused on writing and drawing comics.

For his character, Andy Go, an art-school dropout who finds himself trapped in a world that outlawed creativity, Kim began branching out by 2012. In the webcomic Tune, Kim stepped back from drawing volume two and instead brought on artist Les McClaine to take over those duties—Kim could no longer handle the monotony of the drawing, and instead preferred to focus on production and writing. In the live-action YouTube series Mythomania, an impetus for which was the casting–whitewashing controversy in 2010's The Last Airbender, Kim found he enjoyed filmmaking more than drawing.

Kim was credited as a designer on Animation Domination High-Def's 2013 video, Sympathy for Slender Man Song, which was a 2014 Webby Awards nominee in the category Online Film & Video: Animation.

=== Influences ===
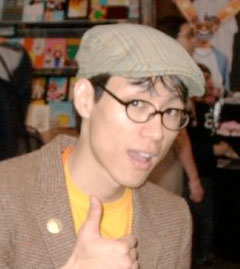
Kim in 2004

Kim became interested in graphical storytelling as a child in South Korea, reading and watching Astro Boy, Gundam, Mazinger Z, Captain Harlock stories, Marine Boy, and Star Blazers. In 2004, citing their oversized influence on development, Kim expressed an interest in illustrating children's books, citing The Little Prince and Oh, the Places You'll Go! as examples.

In 2005, NPR's Jacki Lyden noted that, like Kim, both main characters in Same Difference are Korean-American, though she felt they did not exhibit any explicitly-Korean attributes; Kim told her that he avoided obvious or stereotypical signifiers of their Asianness, instead grafting similar scenes as he and his Korean-American friends had while growing up. In a 2013 interview by Gene Luen Yang for First Second Books, Kim agreed that, in addition to many of his main characters being Asian-American, he consciously imbued his work with an "Asian American-ness", though was saddened it needed to be conscious: "The default race for a central character shouldn't have to be white."

=== Works ===
- With Yang, Gene Luen (w). Duncan's Kingdom, no. 1 (1999).
- With Yang, Gene Luen (w). Duncan's Kingdom, no. 2 (1999).
- "Dave's Blind Date", Narbonic, July 7, 2001, archived from the original on March 26, 2023
- Same Difference and Other Stories. Top Shelf Productions. 2003. ISBN 1-891830-57-0.
- With Kibuishi, Kazu, ed. (2007) [2004]. "The Maiden and the River Spirit". Flight. Vol. 1. New York: Villard. pp. 126–132. ISBN 978-0-345-49636-2 – via Internet Archive.
- With Cendreda, Martin; Dorkin, Evan; Newgarden, Mark (December 2005 – January 2006). "Gag Station". Nickelodeon Magazine. p. 54. ISSN 1073-7510 – via Internet Archive.
- With Hamm, Jesse (2007). Good As Lily. Broadway: DC Comics. ISBN 978-1-4012-1381-7 – via Internet Archive.
- With Willingham, Bill (March 5, 2008). 1001 Nights of Snowfall.
- With Yang, Gene Luen (2009). The Eternal Smile. First Second Books.
- Tune: Vanishing Point. Vol. 1. First Second Books. November 13, 2012. ISBN 9781596435162.
- With McClaine, Les (2013). Tune. Vol. 2. First Second Books.
- The Last Mermaid, no. 1 (March 6, 2024). Image Comics.
- With Perez, Jacob (June 16, 2026). Royals. Image Comics. ISBN 9781534389045.

=== Reception ===
In November 2001, Kim was highlighted and praised in The Comics Journal for his serials Same Difference and Half Empty—then hosted on GeoCities. In September 2004, Shaenon K. Garrity reviewed his body of work for The Webcomics Examiner, and heaped praise on the artist, explicitly calling out his "technical precision and emotional expressiveness."

In September 2002, the Xeric Foundation awarded Kim a self-publishing grant for Same Difference and Other Stories. For his publication thereof, Kim received a 2003 Ignatz Award for Promising New Talent, a 2004 Eisner Award for Talent Deserving of Wider Recognition, and a 2004 Harvey Award for Best New Talent. The third story in 2009's The Eternal Smile, "Urgent Request", earned Kim a 2010 Eisner Award for Best Short Story.
