= The Middleman =

Comic book series

Publication information
- Publisher: Viper Comics
- Schedule: Monthly
- Format: Several mini series
- Publication date: 2005 – Present
- No. of issues: 8 + graphic novel
- Main character(s): The Middleman; Wendy Watson; Ida; Ben Stanley; Lacey Thornfield; Noser; Sensei Ping

Creative team
- Written by: Javier Grillo-Marxuach
- Artist(s): Les McClaine

The Middleman is a comic book series written by Javier Grillo-Marxuach with art by Les McClaine and published by Viper Comics. The series was initially intended to be a television pilot that went on to be published as a comic, before being picked up as a TV series for the 2008 season by ABC Family. The show was cancelled the same year.

== Publication history ==
The first issue was released in July 2005. The mini-series was collected as a single trade paperback volume, entitled The Trade Paperback Imperative. The second trade volume, entitled The Second Volume Inevitability, was released in July 2006 and includes the supplement Legends of the Middlemen, three short stories chronicling the adventures of past Middlemen. The third "mini-series" was released straight to trade in 2007 as The Third Volume Inescapability.

All three volumes were collected in 2008 into a single volume, The Middleman: The Collected Series Indispensability.

In 2009, a fourth volume, The Middleman: The Doomsday Armageddon Apocalypse, was published. Unlike the previous comics, this volume was based on an unpublished script for the ABC Family TV series and serves as the show's finale.

== Plot ==
The Middleman's slogan is "fighting evil so you don't have to" and the character has been doing it for an unknown length of time. The Middleman is not just the incarnation in the current mini series; it is a job, a title, a persona that is handed down from Middleman to Middleman. There are no written records of the Middlemen throughout history; only Ida holds the answers to the present day Middleman's predecessors. Each Middleman receives information via Ida from the "Organization Too Secret To Know" (O2STK). They carry out their orders in typical hero fashion and always save the day.

The series follows hero-by-day, artist-by-night Wendy Watson as she tries to balance her normal life of boyfriends, mothers, and roommates with her more surreal adventures with the Middleman. She is presumably training to become the next Middleman.

Thus far, the adventures of four Middlemen have been chronicled in the book and its supplements – Present Day Middleman, World War Two Middleman (and his doomed sidekick "The Middleboy"), Victorian Middleman and Barbarian Middleman, who operates in a quasi-Hyborean era. All of the historic Middlemen (with the exception of Victorian Middleman) have female sidekicks who bear a peculiar resemblance to Wendy.

In November, 2011, it was announced that The Middleman would cross over with Doctor Who, although the Doctor may not be mentioned by name.

== Characters ==
=== The Middleman (present day) ===
The Middleman's real name and past is unknown to anyone, save Ida, although in the first comic book series (and first episode of the TV series) he recounts having been a Navy SEAL and being recruited shortly after having been cashiered for insubordination. But even though much of his life is a mystery, his character is unmistakable.

In the third trade paperback series, and the scripted 13th episode of the TV show (turned into a standalone comic book), he is revealed to be named Clarence (full name Clarence Colton in the 13th episode). The 13th episode also revealed the Middleman who recruited him.

The Middleman is what Grillo-Marxuach calls a "Dirk Squarejaw" character. He is the all American hero and a callback to heroes of more innocent times. He hardly ever swears. He is rugged, dorky, and he drinks his four glasses of milk every day. It was lightly hinted in the first episode that he had feelings for Wendy.

In the ABC Family TV version, he is played by Matt Keeslar.

=== Wendy Watson ===
Wendy is The Middleman's sidekick and presumably a Middleman-in-training. She was picked because the weird things that the Middleman deals with on a daily basis do not faze her. In many ways, she is the total opposite of The Middleman, which makes her even more perfect for the job.

She is an artist by passion and a temp-worker by necessity. On one of her temp-jobs, something went horribly wrong and she accidentally met The Middleman. He recruited her under the guise of the Jolly Fats Wehawkin Temp Agency. Wendy's roommate calls her "Dub-Dub", for her initials "WW", and reminiscent of the name of Doctor Dolittle's housekeeper, a duck named Dab-Dab. The Middleman picked up on this nickname, and frequently calls her "Dubbie".

In the ABC Family TV version, Wendy is played by Natalie Morales.

=== Ida ===
Ida is a "soulless android from outer space masquerading as a cranky librarian". Like many things in the Middleverse, not much is known about her other than she is the only link between all of the Middlemen. She is the one thing that has been there since the inception of the Middleman program.

The only evidence to her origins come from what she can do, which seems to be almost anything. She has been able to interface with every electronic device she has come in contact with thus far and can also produce a number of weapons. She also used to have the ability to change her personality and appearance until her circuits got stuck on domineering schoolmarm.

In the ABC Family TV version, she is played by Mary Pat Gleason.

=== Lacey Thornfield III ===
Lacey Thornfield is Wendy's sexpot roommate. She is a conceptual artist who specializes in confrontational spoken-word performance art and works small jobs to pay off her student loans. It is unclear exactly what she knows about Wendy's new job, but she's clearly suspicious. In the ABC Family series she also has demonstrated an apparent crush on the Middleman, as shown by her often referring to him as "sexy boss-man" or "pillow lips".

In the ABC Family TV version, Lacey is played by Brit Morgan.

=== Noser ===
Noser's real name is unknown in the continuity of the ABC Family series. He is frequently seen sparring song lyrics with Wendy as she returns to her apartment but has also appeared in other roles assisting Wendy and her roommate.

Noser was, previously unknown to his friends, a world-famous ventriloquist, who retired when he was thirteen. He came out of retirement for a short time to pay off some loans. His ventriloquist dummy is named "Young Noser".

In the ABC Family TV version, Noser is played by Jake Smollett.

=== Sensei Ping ===
Sensei Ping is the martial arts trainer for the Middlemen. He is a member of the Clan of the Pointed Stick, the greatest warrior in the world, and the only man alive to master the Wu-Han Thumb of Death. He wears a Mexican wrestling mask as a tribute to the only man he could not technically beat: El Sapo Dorado, who suffered a fatal heart attack on their twenty-sixth day of fighting.

In the ABC Family TV version, Sensei Ping is played by Mark Dacascos.

=== O2STK ===
O2STK stands for "Organization Too Secret To Know". the organization that gives the Middlemen their marching orders when evil needs fighting. The Middleman and Ida came up with the name as a joke because nothing is known about the organization, not even its real name. Not even Ida knows anything about them.

=== Ben Stanley ===
Ben Stanley is Wendy's on-again/off-again boyfriend. He is a film student who is in touch with his sensitive side but can be a total jerk due to poor social skills. He later publishes the footage of his breakup with Wendy on the Internet, which became an overnight hit and he was whisked off to stardom as a genius movie director.

== Volumes ==
=== Volume 1 – The Trade Paperback Imperative ===
==== Synopsis ====
Volume 1 is the origin story of Wendy Watson. It starts off with her working yet another boring temp job at A.N.D. Laboratories. She is on the phone with her mother when something goes horribly wrong – a giant tentacled ass monster escapes the labs.

It grabs her, and without even panicking, she grabs a letter opener and stabs it. The beast is wounded, but not down – that is until the day is saved by the Middleman.

Due to Wendy's response to her life-threatening situation, The Middleman recruits her under the guise of the Jolly Fats Wehawkin Temp Agency. Her first response to the offer is a hearty, "Hell no." But after her boyfriend breaks up with her (and films it as the subject of his latest documentary), she re-evaluates her life and decision. Wendy joins The Middleman and quickly starts her first adventure.

Mobsters have been dying and the only clues are banana peels left at the scene of the crimes.

The banana peels lead them to Simionics Ltd., where they find genetically engineered apes. They are given a tour by a Dr. Gibbs. Everything seems in order, until they find that a gorilla named Spanky is missing. Spanky also had access to a secret room where he had been collecting and watching mobster movies.

After a few scuffles with the talking Spanky, they return to Simionics Ltd. There, they are greeted by a legion of monkeys and a cackling Dr. Gibbs. She planned to build an army of genetically engineered apes to take over the world.

The Middleman and Wendy fight with the army and in the process destroy the computer that controls the higher brain functions of the simians. The story ends with Dr. Gibbs in jail, with apes having a safe level of intelligence, and with Wendy more inspired artistically than she has been in a while.

==== Issues ====
- 1.1 – The Temporary Employment Sanction

Two covers: normal and the Comic-Con exclusive "Special Completely Inaccurate Variant Cover Edition".

- 1.2 – The Secret Recruitment Ultimatum
- 1.3 – The Experimental Simian Identity
- 1.4 – The Primate Domination Factor

These issues were collected in The Trade Paperback Imperative which was released in July 2006 (ISBN 0977788342).

=== Volume 2 – The Second Volume Inevitability ===
==== Synopsis ====
Sensei Ping has arrived in town to train Wendy and he expects no one less than the Middleman to pick him up from the airport. Only, La Cage De Lumiere, the world's most precious diamond, has just been stolen and also requires his attention. Since The Middleman can not be in two places at once, he reluctantly sends Wendy to pick up Sensei Ping.

On their way back to Jolly Fats Wehawkin Temp Agency, Sensei Ping is kidnapped and Wendy is knocked out by a group of Mexican Wrestlers. The wrestlers get around in a truck for a Latino dairy delivery company named "Los Huevos Gigantes". In fact, they're the ones who stole La Cage De Lumiere.

Using the diamond in concert with a high-powered laser, the wrestlers create a cage of light which they use to imprison Sensei Ping, and the most lethal man alive is finally trapped without hope of escape.

The Middleman launches a rescue operation, but in the process gets caught. Ida and Wendy try to help, but the wrestlers escape with their prisoners after decapitating Ida and shooting Ben, who followed Wendy, in the chest.

The Mexican wrestlers take Sensei Ping and the Middleman to the Dread Pyramid of Itzilichlitlichlitzl to charge them for past crimes. They accuse Sensei Ping of killing the greatest masked wrestler to ever slap the canvas – the legendary El Sapo Dorado. Ping pleads with them. He says he did not kill him, but fought with him for twenty-six straight days, and on the last day of their fight, El Sapo Dorado had a fatal heart attack. Ping took his mask to honor him, for he was the only man he could never beat. They, of course, did not believe him and the only way out is for Ping to choose a champion to fight a champion chosen by the wrestlers. So, the Middleman is going to have to take on Cien Mascaras. Cien Mascaras was once a man with a hundred masks, but then he was cursed by an Aztec mummy and now he is one hundred identical men who must all wear the same mask.

Hoping to mount a rescue, Wendy flies the Middlejet to the wrestlers' stronghold, the Dread Pyramid of Itzilichlitlichlitzl – but not before the Middleman enters his trial by combat against Cien Mascaras. After putting up a brave struggle and taking out dozens of Cien Mascarases, the Middleman is overcome and his leg is broken. As the remaining Cien Mascarases set upon for the kill, Wendy arrives and short circuits the laser cage holding Sensei Ping.

In a display of unspeakable violence, Sensei Ping proceeds to slaughter every last one of the wrestlers – saving his signature finishing move, the Wu-Han Thumb of Death, for El Maestro De Ceremonias, leader of the wrestling troupe and architect of the blood feud.

Returning to the states, the Middleman assures Wendy that she has impressed Sensei Ping, and that someday she will make a great Middleman ... but the victory is bittersweet, as Wendy rushes to see Ben at the hospital, and he breaks up with her once and for all: he doesn't have the stomach to understand her new life as a Middleman in training.

==== Issues ====
- 2.1 – The Entering Dragon Conundrum
- 2.2 – The Winnebago Interrogation Contingency
- 2.3 – The Sino-Mexican Revelation
- 2.4 – The Gilded Amphibian Supremacy

Legends of the Middleman trade paperback was released in July 2006 (ISBN 0975419374).

=== Volume 3 – The Third Volume Inescapability ===
The third volume, The Third Volume Inescapability, was released in September 2007 (ISBN 0979368014). The story was not serialized, as the previous two were, and it was released as a graphic novel.

=== The Middleman: The Collected Series Indispensability ===
This volume collects all three volumes into one, and was released in July 2008 (ISBN 0980238544).

=== The Middleman: The Doomsday Armageddon Apocalypse ===
Based an unpublished series script by creator Javier Grillo-Marxuach and co-executive producer Hans Beimler – with art by Armando Mendoza and layouts by Les Mcclaine – The Doomsday Armageddon Apocalypse picks where the ABC Family series left off, providing a finale for the TV series.

=== The Middleman: The Pan-Universal Parental Reconciliation ===
In 2014, Grillo-Marxuach launched a successful Indiegogo campaign for a fifth print volume, crossing over the previous comic and TV continuities. Les McClane and Armando Zanker contributed art for the original and TV versions respectively.
