= Josh Howard (comics) =

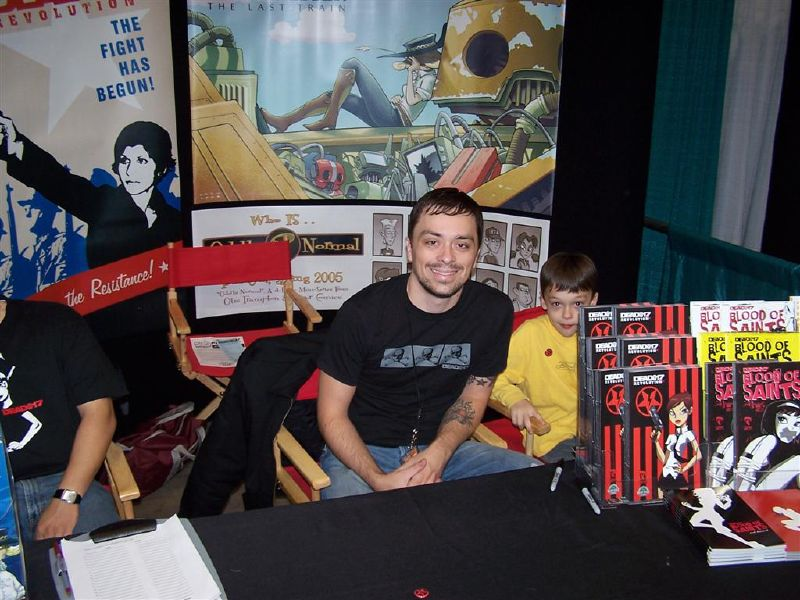
Josh Howard

Josh Howard is the writer/artist of the American comic book series Dead@17 published by Image Comics (formerly published by Viper Comics), Black Harvest published by Devil's Due, and the Lost Books of Eve published by Viper Comics. Howard is also a regular columnist for the Wizard website.
