= The Honey Baked Ham Company =

Retailer of spiral-sliced and other glazed, baked meats

The Honey Baked Ham Co.

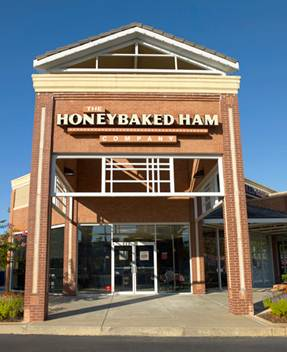
- Honey Baked Ham Store
- Type: Private
- Founded: 1957; 69 years ago Detroit, Michigan, U.S.
- Founder: Harry J. Hoenselaar
- Headquarters: Alpharetta, Georgia, U.S.
- Number of locations: 492 (2020)
- Key people: Deborah Derby, CEO
- Products: Honey Baked bone-in ham, Honey Baked Boneless Ham, and Honey Baked turkey breast and precooked meals.
- Website: honeybaked.com

The Honey Baked Ham Company is a food retailer which sells hams, turkey breasts, and other pre-cooked entrées, side dishes, and desserts. It was founded in 1957 in Detroit and is currently headquartered in Alpharetta, Georgia. As of June 2020, it had 492 outlets across the United States.

== History ==
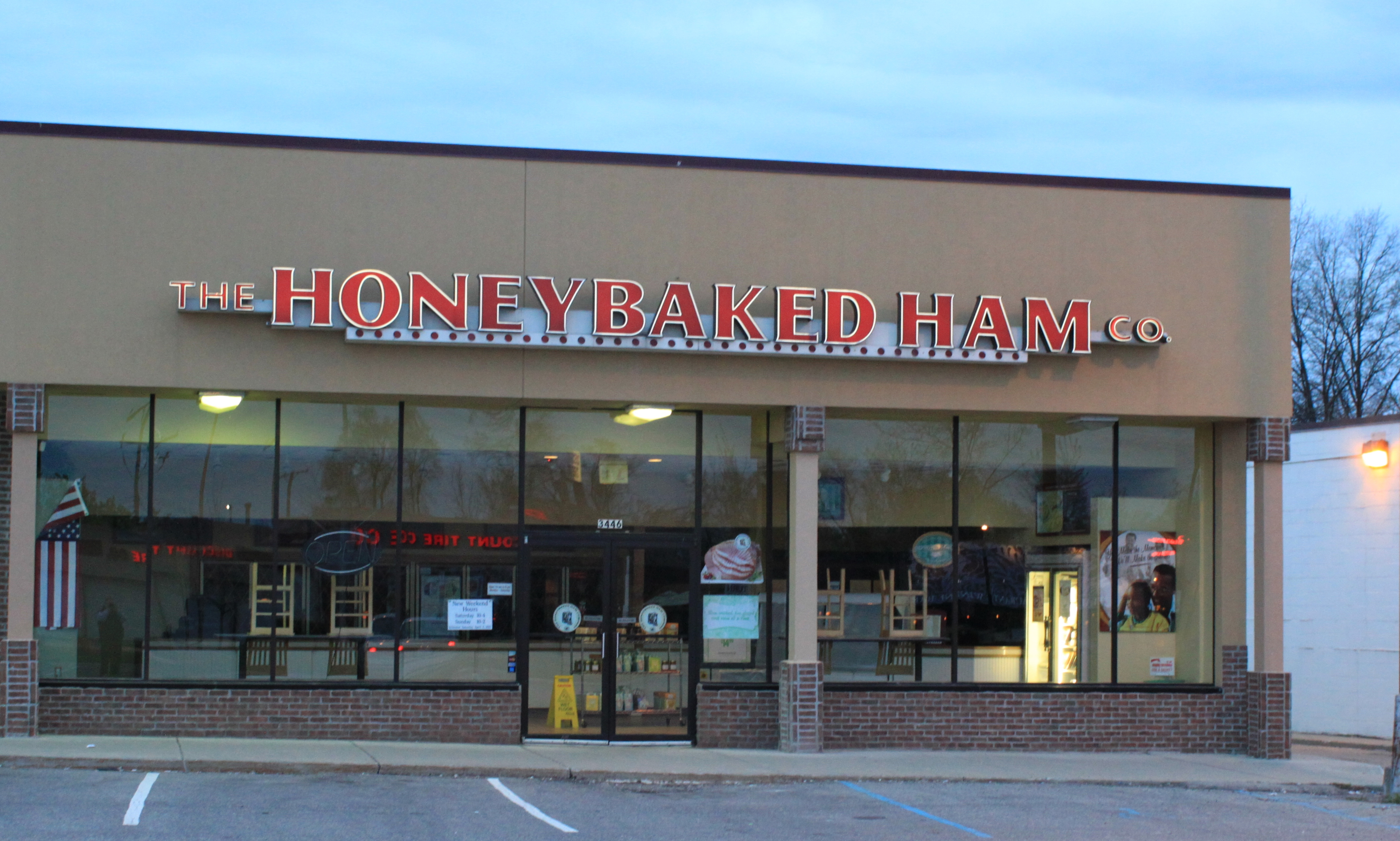
A Honey Baked Ham store in Ann Arbor, Michigan, 2011

=== Early history and founding ===
In 1924, Harry Hoenselaar created a bone-in spiral-slicer that smoked and cooked a ham. He said the idea for the spiral ham slicer "came to him in a dream". Hoenselaar built his prototype spiral slicer using "a tire jack, a pie tin, a washing machine motor, and a knife".

In the 1930s, Hoenselaar sold honey-glazed hams to drugstores in Detroit. Hoenselaar taught lunch counter clerks the proper procedure of slicing ham for sandwiches with a knife; he later bought that drugstore in Detroit from the widow of the previous owner for five hundred dollars. With Hoenselaar's commitment to his slicer, and residing in Detroit, Hoenselaar founded The HoneyBaked Ham Company and Café in 1957.

=== Expansion ===
When the company expanded nationally, he divided the country into four territories and assigned a territory to each of his four daughters.

The company is presently headed by Hoenselaar's granddaughter, Linda van Rees, who moved the headquarters to Alpharetta, Georgia in 2015.

The Honey Baked Ham Company, LLC has grown to over 200 company owned retail stores and 200 franchise locations across the United States, as well as an ecommerce business. As of May 2017, the company is headquartered in Alpharetta and privately owned by the Hoenselaar family. As of June 5, 2020, it had 492 outlets across the United States.

== Accolades ==
In October 2013, Consumer Reports called Honey Baked Ham "clearly best of the bunch". In 2019, Kim Severson with The New York Times called Harry J. Hoenselaar "the father of spiral-cut ham".
