= Javier Grillo-Marxuach =

American screenwriter, born 1969

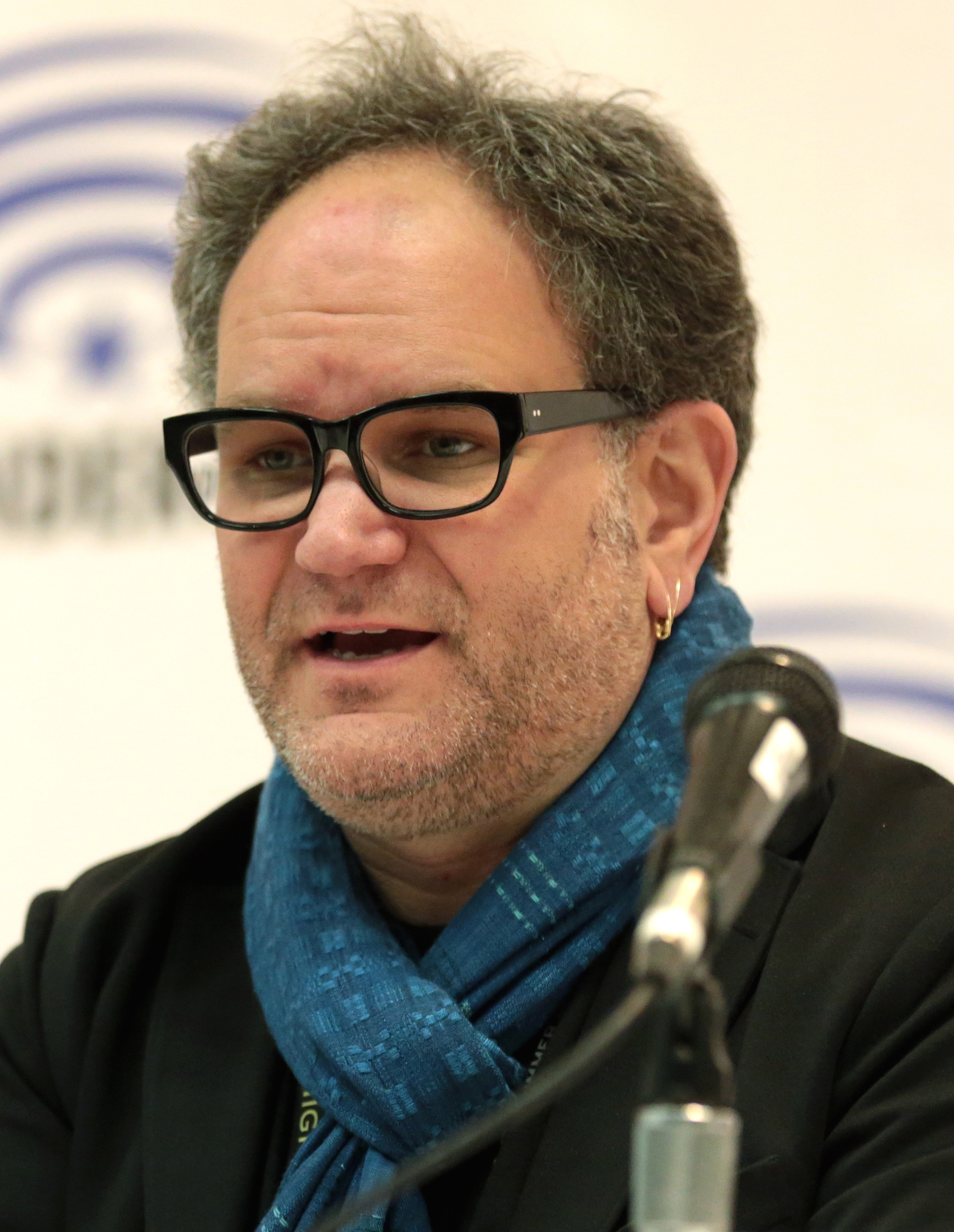
- Grillo-Marxuach in 2017
- Born: October 28, 1969 (age 56); San Juan, Puerto Rico
- Education: University of Southern California (MFA), Carnegie Mellon (BA)
- Occupations: Screenwriter, producer, and podcaster,
- Known for: Lost, Charmed, Law & Order: Special Victims Unit

Javier "Javi" Grillo-Marxuach (born October 28, 1969, in San Juan, Puerto Rico) is a television screenwriter and producer, and podcaster, known for his work as writer and producer on the first two seasons of the ABC television series Lost, as well as other series including Charmed and Law & Order: Special Victims Unit.

== Early life ==
Grillo-Marxuach graduated from Huron High School in Ann Arbor, Michigan. He received a Bachelor of Arts (BA) in 1991 from Carnegie Mellon. While at CMU he was active as an actor, writer and director with Scotch'n'Soda, the theatrical club for non-theater majors that also counts composer Stephen Schwartz, author Iris Rainer Dart and actor Frank Gorshin among its notable alumni. Grillo-Marxuach also wrote a weekly pop-culture column for the campus newspaper, The Tartan.

He has a Master of Fine Arts (MFA) from the University of Southern California and from 2015 was sponsoring a fellowship there for MFA students who demonstrate an interest or facility with Hispanic language and culture.

== Career ==
Grillo-Marxuach joined the crew of Lost as a supervising producer and writer for the first season in 2004. He returned as a supervising producer and writer for the second season in 2005. The writing staff won the Writers Guild of America (WGA) Award for Best Dramatic Series at the February 2006 ceremony for their work on the first and second seasons. The writing staff were nominated for the WGA Award for Best Dramatic Series again at the February 2007 ceremony for their work on the second and third seasons.

In 2006, he left the Lost team, and began working as a co-executive producer for Medium, as well as entering the world of comics with his own Viper Comics title, The Middleman. He also wrote the 2006 Annihilation - Super-Skrull limited series for Marvel Comics, part of the company's Annihilation event, and the Annihilation: Conquest - Wraith limited series for the 2007 Annihilation: Conquest follow-up project. He is also writer of Dynamite Entertainment's four-issue limited series Classic Battlestar Galactica: Cylon Apocalypse. He wrote Cops On the Edge: Episode 89 (2000).

In 2008, the ABC Family picked up his television series The Middleman, for which he is the writer and producer. The series was not picked up for a second season due to poor ratings.

In 2010, a pilot for Department Zero was moved to active production by ABC. The pilot is based upon work by Jonathan Maberry. In 2014 and 2015, Grillo-Marxuach served as co-executive producer of the SyFy channel's series Helix.

Grillo-Marxuach has also served as writer and producer on other series, such as The 100, The Dark Crystal: Age of Resistance and most recently, From. Alongside Jose Molina, he is also the co-host of the Children of Tendu Podcast, a weekly series offering advice for getting into the television industry.

== Filmography ==
Year	Title	Credited as			Notes
Year	Title	Writer	Producer	Executive producer	Notes
1995–1996	SeaQuest DSV	Yes			Writer (3 episodes): episode 3.4 "Destination Terminal"; episode 3.7 "Equilibrium"; episode 3.13 "Weapons of War"
1996	Dark Skies	Yes			Writer (1 episode): episode "Hostile Convergence"
1996–1997	The Pretender	Yes			Writer (3 episodes); story editor: episode "The Better Part of Valor"; episode "The Paper Clock"; episode "Potato Head Blues"
1997	Van Helsing Chronicles	Yes	Yes		Creator (pilot); supervising producer
1998	Three	Yes			Writer (2 episodes); executive story editor: episode "Breakout"; episode "Emerald City"
1998–2000	Charmed	Yes	Yes		Writer (7 episodes); executive story editor; co-producer: episode 1.04 "Dead Man Dating"; episode 1.11 "Feats of Clay"; episode 1.16 "Which Prue is it, Anyway?"; episode 1.21 "Love Hurts"; episode 2.05 "She's a Man, Baby, A Man!"; episode 2.11 "Reckless Abandon"; episode 2.17 "How to Make a Quilt Out of Americans"
2001	Law & Order: Special Victims Unit	Yes			Writer (1 episode): episode 3.07 "Sacrifice"
2001–2002	The Chronicle	Yes	Yes		Writer (6 episodes); producer: episode "Bring Me the Head of Tucker Burns"; episode "Hot From the Oven"; episode "The King is (Un) Dead"; episode "Let Sleeping Dogs Fry"; episode "Pig Boy's Big Adventure"; episode "Touched by An Alien")
2002	The Dead Zone	Yes			Writer (1 episode): episode 1.07 "Enemy Mind"
2003	Boomtown	Yes	Yes		Writer (1 episode); producer: Episode "Monsters Brawl"
2003–2004	Jake 2.0	Yes	Yes		Writer (3 episodes); supervising producer: episode "The Good, The Bad and The Geeky"; episode "Whiskey - Tango - Foxtrot"; episode "Get Foley"
2004–2005	Lost	Yes	Yes		Writer (7 episodes); supervising producer: "House of the Rising Sun" (Season 1, Episode 6); "All the Best Cowboys Have Daddy Issues" (Season 1, Episode 11); "Hearts and Minds" (Season 1, Episode 13) with Carlton Cuse; "...In Translation" (Season 1, Episode 17) with Leonard Dick; "Born to Run" (Season 1, Episode 22) (story); "Orientation" (Season 2, Episode 3) with Craig Wright; "Collision" (Season 2, Episode 8) with Leonard Dick
2006–2008	Medium	Yes	Yes		Writer (8 episodes); co-executive producer: "Four Dreams Part 1" (Season 3, Episode 1) with Glenn Gordon Caron; "Four Dreams Part 2" (Season 3, Episode 2) with Glenn Gordon Caron; "Apocalypse, Push" (Season 3, Episode 11); "We Had A Dream" (Season 3, Episode 15); "1-900-LUCKY" (Season 3, Episode 18) with Robert Doherty; "Head Games" (Season 3, Episode 20) with Robert Doherty & Moira Kirkland; "Burn Baby Burn Part 1" (Season 4, Episode 7); "Burn Baby Burn Part 2" (Season 4, Episode 8) with René Echevarria
2008	The Middleman	Yes		Yes	Creator; writer (2 episodes): "The Pilot Episode Sanction" (Season 1, Episode 1); "The Sino-Mexican Revelation" (Season 1, Episode 3)
2011	Charlie's Angels	Yes	Yes		Writer (2 episodes); consulting producer
2014–2015	Helix	Yes	Yes		Writer (4 episodes); co-executive producer
2016	The 100	Yes	Yes		Writer (2 episodes); co-executive producer
2017	The Shannara Chronicles	Yes	Yes		Writer (1 episode); Consulting producer
2018	Guardians of the Galaxy	Yes	No		Writer (1 episode)
2019	Blood & Treasure	Yes	Yes		Writer (2 episodes); Consulting producer
2019	The Dark Crystal: Age of Resistance	Yes	Yes		Writer (1 episode); Consulting producer: "Time to Make ... My Move" (Season 1, Episode 7)
2021	Cowboy Bebop	Yes			Writer
2022	From	Yes	Yes		Writer (2 episodes); Consulting producer

== Bibliography ==
- Annihilation: Super-Skrull (with artist Greg Titus, 4-issue mini-series, Marvel Comics, 2006)
- Annihilation: Conquest - Wraith (with artist Kyle Hotz, 4-issue mini-series, 2007)
- Battlestar Galactica: Cylon Apocalypse (limited series, Dynamite Entertainment, 2007)
- The Middleman (a number of mini-series, Viper Comics, 2005–present)

== See also ==
- List of Puerto Ricans
