= Dead@17 =

US comic book series

Dead@17 is a series formerly published by Viper Comics. The mini-series was later being published by Image Comics. It was created by Josh Howard and focuses on a girl, Nara Kilday, who is killed and then reborn to fight demons.

== Publication history ==
=== Dead@17 ===
Written and Drawn by Josh Howard

Nara Kilday is killed, and finds herself mysteriously revived. She discovers she has to prevent the coming of Bolabogg, a demonic lord. This series also introduces Hazy Foss, her best friend, and Elijah, a friend of the two girls who Nara has a crush on. The mysterious Noel appears, who helps the three fight hordes of undead and other monstrosities. Nara banishes Bolabogg back to his realm.

=== Dead@17: Protectorate ===
Written by Alex Hamby, Art by Benjamin Hall, Colors by Marlena Hall

Dead@17: Protectorate is a prequel to the Dead@17. Protectorate deals with the first adventure of Jake Sullivan and Abraham Pitch as they encounter the evil of Bolabogg for the first time.

=== Blood of Saints ===
Written and Drawn by Josh Howard

Taking place shortly after the original series, Blood of Saints opens with the suicide of Violet Grey, who is driven to kill herself by Bolabogg. Nara discovers Hazy and Elijah are dating without telling her, and she leaves town with Noel. When the police inspect Violet's home, they discover she was drawing odd symbols much like Nara. When Violet revives, she aligns herself with Bolabogg, and kidnaps Hazy. A psychic link alerts Nara, who is teleported back to the city by Winston, a friend of Noel's who is also an angelic being. Violet escapes, impregnated with a young Bolabogg, and Nara, Hazy, and Elijah ally themselves with Noel, who has a connection with Nara.

=== Rough Cut ===
Rough Cut is a series of Dead@17 tales with background information on supporting characters.

=== Revolution ===
Violet is found, catatonic and no longer with child. Bolabogg, in a human body, has matured into an adult who is a Senator running to be the next President of the United States. He is seemingly assassinated, but heals a short time later. The assassins, Heaven's Militia, led by Joan, locate Nara, who is back with a pregnant Hazy. Joan tells Nara some of her history as a reborn, and her own rebirth occurred when she was burned at the stake, as Joan of Arc. Kidnapped by Bolabogg, one of his henchmen reveals he is Nara's father, and had an affair with Noel's wife so she could give birth to a being suitable for Bolabogg's return. In a fight with the reborn Bolabogg, Nara transforms into a being of light, and banishes him. In the battle, Hazy was killed, but Nara uses her powers to regenerate her, and part of the costs seems to be the cost of her life.

=== The 13th Brother ===
The forces of darkness are gathering and the stage has been set for the return of the Thirteenth Brother, a being rumored to be powerful enough to usher in the reign of Hell on Earth. But as his followers work to prepare the way, an unlikely obstacle emerges in the form of seventeen-year-old Asia Black. After miraculously returning to life after a fatal car accident, Asia discovers she's not quite herself anymore. But is she the champion of good, or is there something much more to Asia's brush with death than meets the eye?

=== Afterbirth ===
Nara Kilday has returned from the dead as Gemini, agent of the celestial covert ops force known as the Zodiac. Her primary mission has been the safeguarding of her best friend Hazy who is now the living embodiment of the Key to the Abyss. But while they've spent the last three years trying to piece together a normal life, Earth has continued its shift into Hell's domain, setting the world on the inevitable path towards apocalypse.

=== Witch Queen ===
After being forced to kill her closest friend, Nara found herself banished to Purgatory by the Beast from the Abyss. Doomed to wander a hostile and timeless wasteland ruled by the mysterious Witch Queen, Nara has accepted her fate as penance for her actions. Haunted by her past, she faces her greatest challenge as she confronts who she's been and what she will become.

=== The Blasphemy Throne ===
For the last 10 years, Nara Kilday has gone up against the worst Hell has to offer, losing many friends and allies along the way. Now she faces her greatest threat: an unholy pact between her oldest nemesis and the Great Beast. While the world is thrown into chaos, Nara remains helpless, captive to an unknown force, the secret to victory hidden somewhere in her past. The countdown to Earth's final hours has begun.

== Characters ==
- Nara Kilday: The protagonist of the series, Nara has a trademark image at the end of the first comic as an axe-wielding schoolgirl.
- Hazy Foss: Nara's best friend.
- Elijah: Nara's crush, friend, and later, Hazy's boyfriend.
- Noel Raddemer: Nara's mother's husband, left by her years ago.
- Winston: Noel's friend, devoted minister.
- Joan of Arc: A member of Heaven's Militia.
- Grace True: The central character of Protectorate.
- Violet Grey: A possessed reborn being and "mother" to Bolabogg's reborn "human" self.
- Bolabogg: A demonic entity.
- Abraham "Abe" Pitch: First appeared as bodiless villain from Dead@17 vol. 1, Dead@17: Protectorate, Dead@17 Rough Cut vol. 1

== Film adaptation ==
A Dead@17 film was announced by creator Josh Howard, stating that screenwriter Michael Dougherty would write the script and Producer Lorenzo di Bonaventura would be developing the project, with Vanessa Hudgens possibly starring as the story's hero, Nara Kilday. "I don't know if this is true anymore — it's been a while since I received an update — but they were talking to Vanessa Hudgens," said Howard, who went on to speculate that she might play the title character but would probably be better for Nara's best friend, Hazy Foss. Although Howard has said that Hudgens was attached to the role back in June 2009, more recent reports have stated that the movie was progressing very slowly, with no one then attached. On March 17, 2010 Dennis Iliadis was named as the director and MTV Films was stated to be producing the film.

On November 25, 2015, Dead@17 creator Josh Howard announced that a live action adaptation of his comic was set to be released in February 2016; an official short production by POPBOOM.com, Dead@17 Rebirth was directed by Jack Heller and stars newcomers CC Weske as Nara and Lucy Freyer as Hazy.
