= James Robert Smith (author) =

American author

James Robert Smith (born June 28, 1957) is an American author. His first novel, The Flock (ISBN 1-59414-377-3), was published August 2, 2006, by Five Star.

== The Flock ==
The Flock
- Author: James Robert Smith
- Language: English
- Genre: Thriller
- Publisher: Forge Books
- Publication date: November 9, 2010
- Publication place: United States
- Media type: Print (Hardback)
- Pages: 368
- ISBN: 0765328011

The Flock is a 2006 novel by James Smith. The Flock is a contemporary eco-thriller about what can happen when man violates nature, and when nature fights back.

=== Plot ===
The novel centers on a pack of intelligent, dinosaur like birds which escape a remote Florida swamp following initial construction efforts related to a planned theme park, and the efforts of one young Fish and Wildlife officer to protect local human and non-human residents from each other and outside interests.

=== Film adaptation ===
A film adaptation of The Flock has been optioned.

== Publications ==
"A Certain Kindness", Midnight Shambler No. 6
