= Viper Comics =

Comic publisher based in Texas

- Industry: Comics
- Founded: 2003
- Headquarters: Dallas, Texas, United States
- Key people: Jessie Garza (President/Publisher); Dale Mettam (Editor-in-Chief); Tony Garza (Senior Creative and Digital Director)
- Products: Comic books, graphic novels, trade paperbacks
- Website: vipercomics.com

Viper Comics was an American comics publisher that first published works in 2003.

== History ==
Viper Comics was based in Texas, U.S.; according to its website it is based in Irving, an inner ring suburb of Dallas. Its president since its foundation is Jessie Garza. The company was established in 2001, though its first comics were printed in 2003, launching with Dead@17 and Moon Rush. Dead@17 was considered a sleeper hit for the company and received positive reviews.

Viper Comic books have been distributed by Diamond Comic Distributors and their graphic novels were distributed through Diamond, Ingram Books, Baker & Taylor, Inc., and other distributors.

== Works published ==
The following is a list of titles published by Viper Comics:

- Attack of the Killer Tomatoes
- A Bit Haywire
- Battle Smash Vs. The Saucermen From Venus
- Blue Agave & Worm
- Daisy Kutter
- Dead@17 – one of Viper Comics' first two titles, but later moved to Image Comics.
- Dummy's Guide to Danger
- Emily Edison – recommended by The Young Adult Library Services Association (YALS) in 2007 as one of its Great Graphic Novels for Teens
- "The Expendable One"
- Hell House: The Awakening
- Inspector Gadget
- Johnny Test
- Karma Incorporated
- Kid Houdini and the Silver Dollar Misfits
- The Lost Books of Eve
- The Middleman – recommended by The Young Adult Library Services Association (YALS) in 2007 as one of its Great Graphic Novels for Teens
- Missing Linx
- Moon Rush – one of Viper Comics' first two titles
- Nosferatu
- Oddly Normal – first published with Viper Comics but later moved to Image Comics
- Random Encounter
- Sasquatch (Sasquatch Comic Anthology)
- Stu Bear in the 25th Century
- Villains
- Vendor
