= Boomslang (music festival) =

Annual festival in Kentucky, US

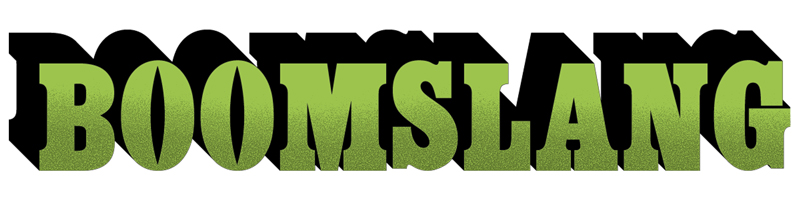
- The Boomslang snake eyes logo
- Genre: Music festival
- Frequency: Annual
- Locations: Lexington, Kentucky (2009–2013)
- Years active: 17
- Inaugurated: 2009
- Most recent: 23–25 September 2011; 20–23 September 2012
- Website: boomslangfest.com

Boomslang: A Celebration of Sound & Art was an annual multi-venue music festival in Lexington, Kentucky, organized by the University of Kentucky's college radio station, WRFL. The festival was an extension of WRFL's mission to provide a platform for non-mainstream, non-commercial music and other programming not found elsewhere in the region, featuring a variety of artists from both the region and from around the world. Genres tended to be experimental in nature, but also included everything from alternative rock, post-rock, electronic, hip hop, punk rock, metal, and psychedelic rock bands. Other festival features included dance performances, local craft booths, fashion and art installations, workshops, literary events and film screenings, with a special focus on the artists and arts organizers that make Lexington unique.

Boomslang was primarily volunteer-run, relying on the efforts of WRFL staff members and led by WRFL's student Board of Directors.

== Etymology ==
The name "Boomslang" was chosen in 2009 by a committee looking for a catchy word, after the highly venomous snake found in Africa. The coloration and "snake eyes" in the festival logo, designed by WRFL art director Robert Beatty, were inspired by the boomslang snake.

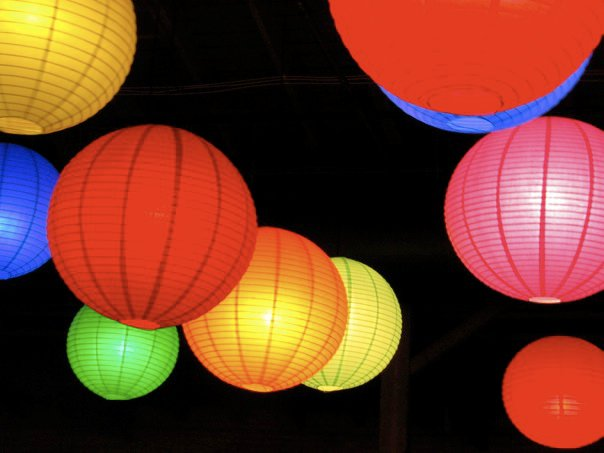
The paper lanterns commonly associated with Boomslang

== History ==
=== Creation ===
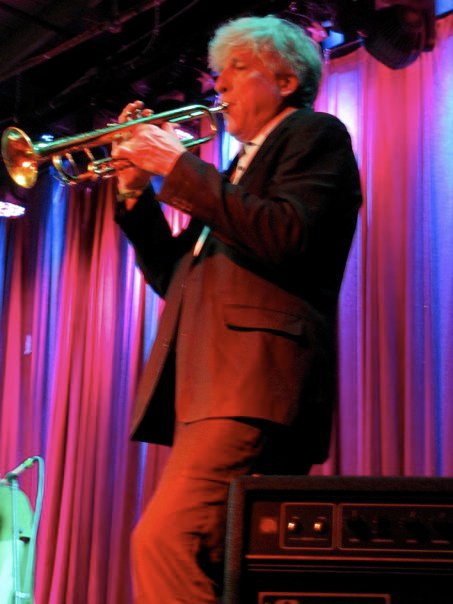
American avant-garde and minimalist composer, guitarist, and trumpet player Rhys Chatham at the 2010 Boomslang music festival.

The inaugural 2009 festival was conceived and organized by WRFL DJs in the attempt to highlight Lexington's unique venues, artists and organizations, with an emphasis on the local counter-culture which WRFL has nurtured since its inception. The lineup included a couple of nods to the 1960s and 1970s with German krautrock pioneers Faust and masters of psychedelic Tropicalia Os Mutantes. The line-up was heavy on psychedelic and post-rock music, also including Mission of Burma, Papa M (the solo project of Slint guitarist Dave Pajo), The Black Angels, Bardo Pond, a mixed media presentation by Mark Hosler, a founding member of Negativland. The line-up also included the first live collaboration between Lexington-based Casino Versus Japan and Deerhunter frontman Bradford Cox (a.k.a. Atlas Sound), who would later tour together in 2010.

Another key concept behind Boomslang was the inclusion of non-musical features, including a 2009 circus-themed fashion show and a carnival scene that took place in the parking lot of one of the primary venues, stretching the boundaries of traditional rock culture. The 2009 and 2010 events also included a tent for display of locally made art for sale, games, and information tables for political and environmental non-profit groups promoting counter-culture and political awareness.

It was announced on May 7, 2014, that WRFL would no longer host the festival, effectively ending it.

== Satellite events ==
Boomslang strove to provide a platform for Lexington's left-of-center creative community, hosting a number "satellite events" organized by various local artists and organizations. In addition to those listed below, Boomslang hosted a Dorkbot workshop on D.I.Y. music instruments.

=== Stars with Accents ===
Each year Accents, a WRFL radio show for literature, art, and culture, hosted Stars with Accents, a literary celebration supported by the Kentucky Women Writers Conference and The Carnegie Center for Literacy and Learning. Stars with Accents featured readings by authors such as Crystal Wilkinson, C.E. Morgan, Sallie Bingham, and more.

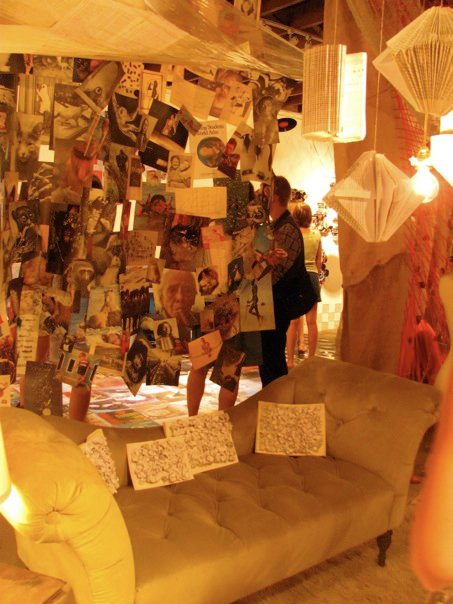
An art installation piece at Boomslang's 2010 Neighborhood Series.

=== Neighborhood Series Fashion Event ===
Boomslang also teamed up with the Lexington Fashion Collaborative to bring innovative local fashion and art to the festival, with the second annual installation of The Neighborhood Series. The Neighborhood Series took place at Land of Tomorrow Gallery, a gallery owned and operated by University of Kentucky College of Design professors, and included eight installation pieces with coordinating fashion-forward costumes that reflected eight locally owned businesses. The materials used to create the works of art came straight from each business's trash.

=== Queerslang ===
Boomslang 2011 marked the inaugural event of Queerslang, an all-day, multi-media, entertainment and education-based event, which strives to lift up the local, LGBTQIA community. The mission of Queerslang is to create visibility for the LGBTQIA community and to highlight shared interests in music, art and performance with the whole of the Lexington community.

Queerslang (which has continued, outliving the original Boomslang festival) provides free "skillshare" workshops, film screenings in addition to the Queerslang dance party. Workshops are hosted by touring and local artists and speakers, and cover a variety of subjects both geared to the LGBTQIA community and to a broader arts community. Skillshare workshops have covered such topics as safe sex, turntablism, tattoo art. Film screenings at the 2011 Queerslang included special guest Meredith Heil from UC Santa Cruz, who showcased her short documentary, "Whistlin’ Dixie."

=== Kid-friendly Music ===
Boomslang hosted two kid-oriented concerts, organized by the host of Ages 3 and Up!, a WRFL show geared toward kids of all ages. 2010's kid-friendly event featured children's artist and ukulele player Heidi Swedberg, perhaps best known for her role as Susan on Seinfeld.

=== Film ===
The festival teamed up with local film-oriented institutions Lexington Film League and KET to incorporate film into the fest, including a 2010 screening of "Heavy Metal Parking Lot" in the parking lot of the venue Buster's. Many other artists have incorporated film and video projections into their performances, including Sound/Vision, offthesky, Wooden Shjips, and Strangers Family Band.

=== Doomslang ===
Beginning in 2012 and also done in 2013, Boomslang started a spin-off set for one of the stages entitled "Doomslang". This set featured bands primarily from the doom metal scene though other heavy metal genres have been incorporated. Saint Vitus headlined the first year along with White Hills, Weedeater, Author & Punisher and Sourvein. Pallbearer headlined the 2013 edition with Thou.

== Boomslang lineups by year ==
=== 2013 ===
Blonde Redhead, Clinic, BODY/HEAD, Saul Williams, ADULT., Youth Lagoon, Com Truise, The Blow, Bleached, Chelsea Wolfe, Pallbearer, Thou, Cunnin Lynguists, Grails, Marnie Stern, Scout Niblett, No Joy, Heatsick, Pop. 1280, ITAL, Inter Arma, Pure X, Dope Body, Locrian, Dent May, Idiot Glee, Graham Lambkin/Jason Lescalleet, Fielded, Jamaican Queens, Young Widows, Nemo Achida, A Tribe Called Lex, Ancient Warfare, Jeanne Vomit Terror & Ed Sunspot, Carl Calm, Motherplant, Potty Mouth, (OHLM), Too Many Drummers, Electric Citizen, Mayonnaise, Stampede.

=== 2012 ===
The Jesus & Mary Chain, Jeff Mangum (Neutral Milk Hotel), Das Racist, Cloud Nothings, Deerhoof, Saint Vitus, Negativland, Futurebirds, Girl in A Coma, Oneohtrix Point Never, Weedeater, The Music Tapes, The Apache Relay, Author & Punisher, Buke and Gase, The Younger Lovers, São Paulo Underground, Five Knives, Sleeping Bag, William Tyler, Gary War, Janka Nabay & The Bubu Gang, White Hills, Hive Mind, Dinosaur Feathers, XAMBUCA, Merkaba, Sourvein

=== 2011 ===
Swans, Pelican, Tom Tom Club, Ty Segall, Sir Richard Bishop, Julianna Barwick, Horseback, Secret Chiefs 3, The Ssion, MEN, Woodsman

=== 2010 ===
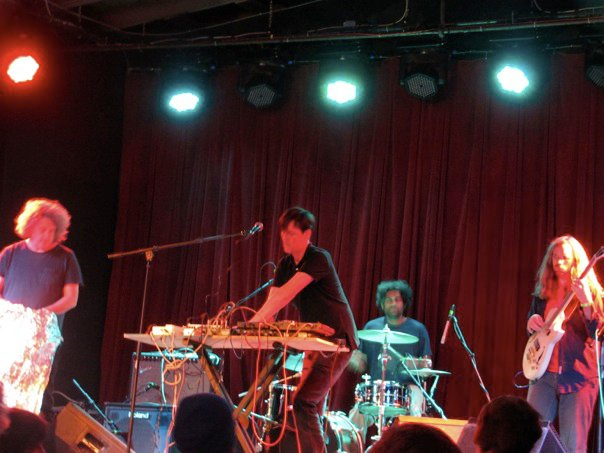
American space rock/psychedelic rock band Wooden Shjips and Sonic Boom at the 2010 Boomslang music festival.

Rhys Chatham, Death, Sonic Boom, Akron/Family, Ben Frost, Glass Candy, Harlem, Rangda (featuring Ben Chasny, Chris Corsano, and Sir Richard Bishop), Wooden Shjips, His Name Is Alive, Wolf Eyes, Thee American Revolution, Burning Star Core, Casino Versus Japan, Phantom Family Halo, Sapat, The Barry Mando Project, Blood Carries Disease, Brothertiger, City Center, Cymarshall Law, Devine Carama, Deluxin’, Diminished Men, DJ Warrenpeace, Everyone Lives Everyone Wins w/ Ghost Affirmation, Paul K & the Weathermen, Ford Theatre Reunion, Global.Ken, Ian Thomas, Jews and Catholics, J. Marinelli, Jovontaes, Jozef van Wissem, Loose Change, Lucky Pineapple, March Madness Marching Band, Milyoo, Cheyenne Mize, Mr. Daybony, Naam, The Nativity Singers, The N.E.C., Nemo Quotidian, Pezhed & the Blipsquad, Psychic Steel, R. Keenan Lawler, The Royal Batfangs, The Seedy Seeds, Silverware, Sound/Vision, Soft Opening, Spooky Qs, Stampede, Heidi Swedberg, Tiny Folk, Warmer Milks, Vee Dee, The Web, Zak Riles, WRFL DJs

=== 2009 ===
Faust, Os Mutantes, The Black Angels, Shipping News, Papa M, Rachel's (Rachel Grimes), Negativland (Mark Hosler), Atlas Sound, Bardo Pond, Disappears, Teeth Mountain, Hair Police, Burning Star Core, Casino Versus Japan, These United States, Lush Life, Tiny Fights, Sound/Vision, Everyone Lives Everyone Wins
