= Steve Brudniak =

American sculptor, actor and musician

Steve Brudniak (born April 9, 1961, Topeka, Kansas) is an American artist, actor, filmmaker and musician. Known for highly crafted, unusual assemblage sculpture, imbued with transcendental and unique scientific elements; his visual art career spans over four decades, with work in the permanent collections of several art museums in United States. His acting and film endeavors began at the age of 13. Some notable roles include pivotal characters in Richard Linklater's Waking Life and Robert Rodriguez's Hypnotic. Brudniak was also a founding member of Spiny Normen and other psychedelic music groups from 1977 ‒ present and operated Victorian Recording Studio during the mid 1980s. He spent his elementary, high school years, and early 20's in Houston, Texas, eventually moving to Austin, Texas where he currently lives.

== Art ==
Noumenon Objectifying in Four Parts (2005), assemblage with emanating reflection optical lens, 48 x 19 x 6 in. (collection of Catarina Sigerfoos, Austin, Texas)

The Vagus Leviathan (2008), assemblage with photograph, fiber optic lens and kinetic mechanism, 50 x 21 x 6 in. (Collection of John Little)

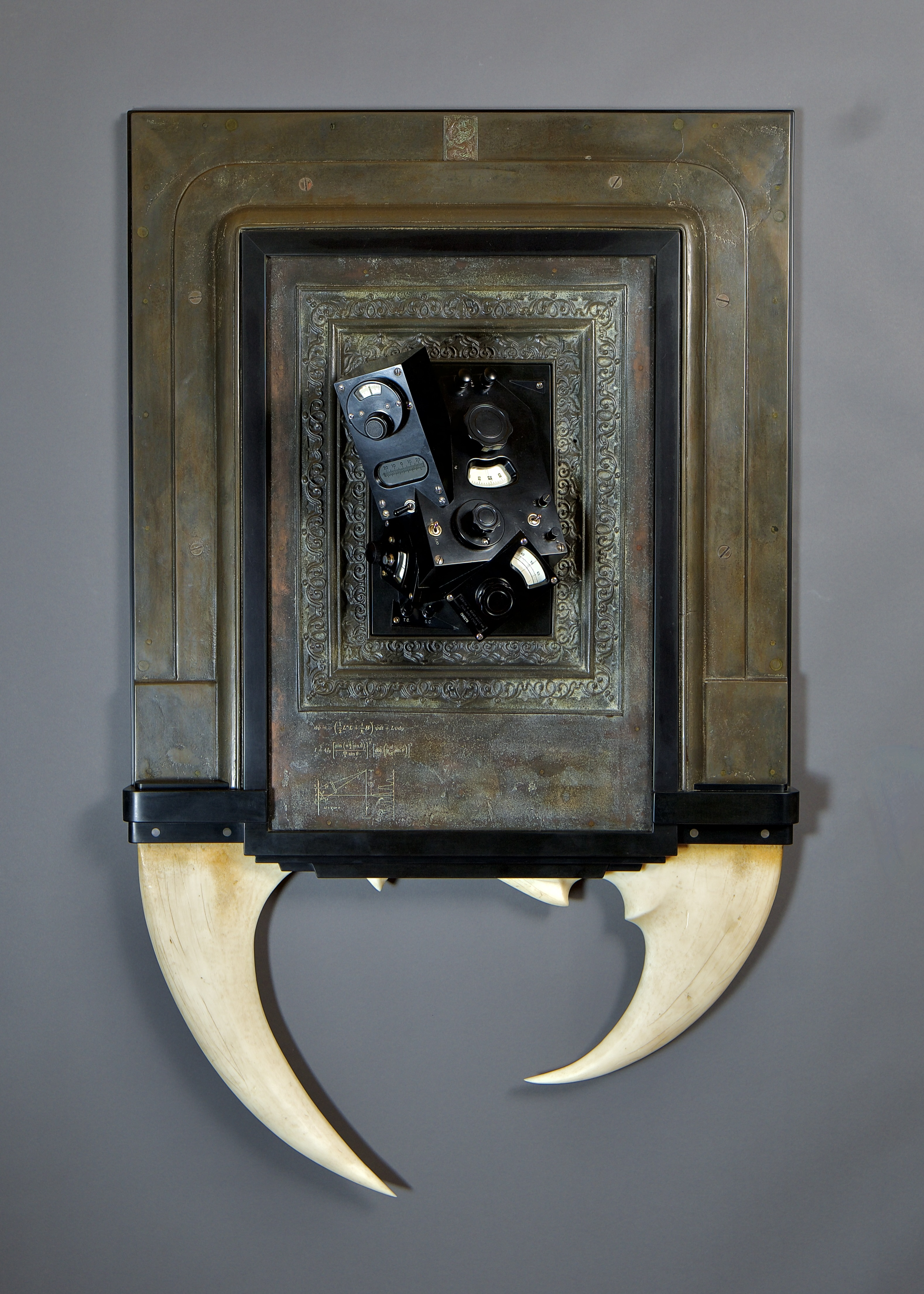
Ontological Catastrophe (2019), assemblage with antique electronic test equipment and engraved cast iron, carved phenolic and ABS plastics. 51 x 31 x 7 in.

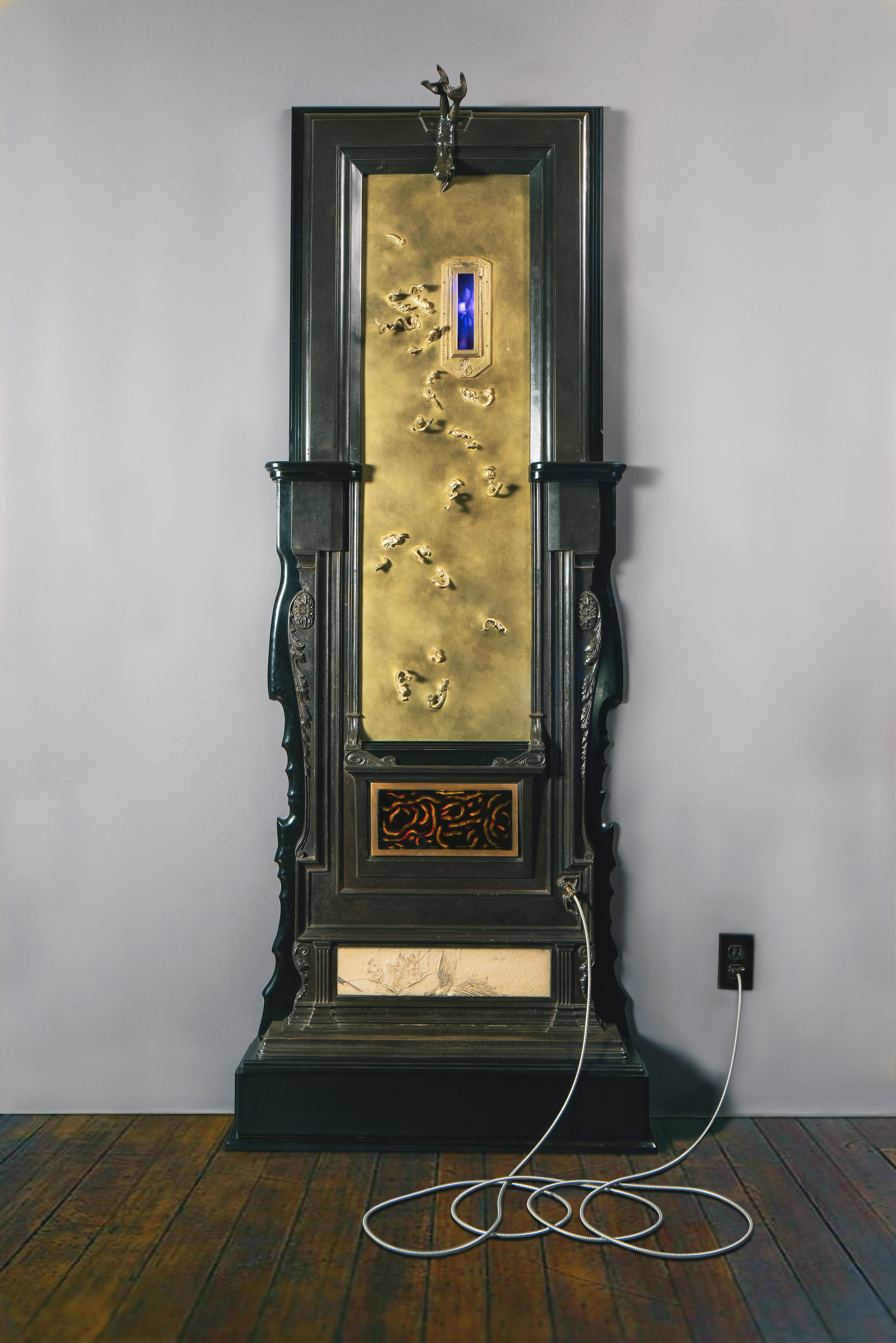
In the Wake of the Exodus Toward the Breach in the Gate (2018), assemblage with ultraviolet light, glass optics, antique bronze fish, brass plate, antique cast iron, carved phenolic, 4 million year old fish fossil, colored jojoba oil and brass snake chain. 82 x 33 x 8 in.

Like a sign at the entrance to a splendid nature preserve, the information is a poor abstract for the ineffable. A dream retold will come off as boring description, but to be inside the dream is inexplicably rich. (Steve Brudniak, 2023)

During the 1980s Brudniak was an active member of the Houston Alternative Art scene and represented by four different galleries during this time. In 1988 he moved to Austin, Texas, Texas, where he continues to work from his Bouldin Creek studio. His art has been included well over 100 exhibitions, and is in the collections of The Museum of Fine Arts, Houston; San Antonio Museum of Art; Mexic-Arte Museum, Austin; Art Museum of South Texas, Corpus Christi; El Paso Museum of Art; Art Museum of Southeast Texas, Beaumont; and Ogden Museum of Southern Art, New Orleans. In 2008 his Astrogeneris Mementos became the first assemblage sculptures exhibited in outer space, taken aboard the International Space Station by entrepreneur and astronaut Richard Garriott.

Brudniak's assemblages engage the phenomena of consciousness through applications of experimental phenomenal media, incorporating, often pioneering, unconventional and scientific elements such as high voltage electricity, gyro mechanics, combustion, ultraviolet, laser, optical and fiber optic technologies, as well as the oldest known geological and living preservations. His 1987 Imogene Icon (collection of San Antonio Museum of Art) is considered the earliest application of a Tesla coil incorporated into a permanent sculpture and his 1991 sculpture The Saturated Well of Baptism, the first to use magnetic ferrofluid in a sculptural context.

Filmmaker Guillermo Del Toro writes, “Each of Steve Brudniak's artifacts is a relic from a time that never was, and each of them holds a secret. Through superb craftsmanship and a keen eye for design, Brudniak integrates science and technology into his sculptures: ...groundbreaking uses of retro tech shock, produce lightning, induce hypnosis, reflect impossible images and light and produce sound through interaction. Liquids miraculously come alive. Other works amaze merely with their unprecedented content and exquisite form. Brudniak fabricates, manipulates or re-shapes found materials into absolutely coherent, powerful works of art.”

His integration of found objects in the construction of art differs from collage by appearing to be operational machines or ritualistic implements that operate on psychological and spiritual levels. In her 1992 ARTnews review, Elizabeth McBride elaborates: “The landscape he has created with his latest sculptures is dark, frightening, reminiscent of ancient sacrificial structures and torture chambers. And although they are assemblages, they resemble real objects that at some time might have really existed. Thus the physical beauty of Brudniak's work is balanced by the horror of obsession, addiction, and captivity. Caught in such conflicts, we feel danger is everywhere…Brudniak achieves a powerful, exquisite range not only with real objects-how easy to slip into the trap, how difficult to climb out—but with illusions, whose most potent effects are created not in the gallery but in the internal world that each of us inhabits.” Arts writer and curator Anjali Gupta observes, “His explorations of the self and the subconscious become deliberately and elaborately inscrutable vaults for the unknowable. He invalidates the deductive reasoning associated with scientific hypotheses in his conceptual approach but mollifies it in the aesthetic outcome. Brudniak tilts referentiality without mollifying it; rather, he encrypts it.”

Though Brudniak's work is sometimes perceived as dark or sourced from personal neuroses, it is often grounded in a search for spiritual “truths,” the exploration of consciousness or the ineffable. In The Art of Dreams, Visions, Other Worlds: Interviews with Texas Artists by Robert Bunch, Brudniak states: “And though a fan of mystery (UFOs, telepathy, gravity, etc.), I don't like to believe blindly. Finding truth in “magic” is more thrilling when it's undeniable. That said, I do envy the enchantment of the metaphysical, so as an artist I empowered this set [Diving Implements for Profits Messiahs and Physicians, 1989, collection of The Museum of Fine Arts, Houston]...to indicate, magnify, and reflect as a diagnostic for psych-spiritual dysfunction.” He later says “I'm fascinated by the way things we value are presented. In this case, the oldest living thing on Earth. I'm interested in triggering the unexpected within consciousness upon seeing something so out of the ordinary, in person, magnified by architectural glorification.” Elaborating on a 2018 sculpture, In the Wake of the Exodus Toward the Breach in the Gate, Brudniak says: “A chamber filled with forty feet of brass snake chain in oil and a four-million-year-old fossil were painstakingly retrofitted into nineteenth-century iron furnace frames. It was a real odyssey interpolating the antique brass dolphins swimming toward that portal (a distinctly unique engineered effect) into the brass ocean. The impossibility of what the viewer sees becoming possible is critical to my art. This sculpture embodies my best attempt at the ultimate goal in thirty-seven years of effort: words that cannot be heard, description that can only be sensed. This piece has to be met, and where you go will only make sense when you shut off your mind.”

His Treatise, Saving Beauty: The Painful Rebirthing of Visual Aesthetic in Contemporary Art, is a scolding commentary on the diminishing importance of visual beauty and craft in postmodern, contemporary art.

=== Art Books and Documentaries ===
The monograph, The Science of Surrealism - Assemblage Sculpture of Steve Brudniak was published in 2013 documenting thirty years of the artist's career in photos, essays and commentary. It was edited by Anjali Gupta, with a foreword by Guillermo del Toro and is in 99 public, university, and museum libraries worldwide. Books and documentaries featuring Brudniak's work are listed in the bibliography below.

==== Art books ====
- Bunch, Robert Craig. Dreams, Visions, Other Worlds: Interviews with Texas Artists. College Station, TX: Texas A&M University Press, 2024
- Webbernick, Gary. 100 Texas Sculptors. Austin, TX: Texas Sculpture Group, 2024
- Bunch, Robert Craig, The Art of Found Objects: Interviews with Texas Artists. College Station, TX: Texas A&M University Press, 2016.
- Chemeketa College Art Faculty. Art for Everyone, Salem, Oregon: Chemeketa Press, 2016.
- Gupta, Anjali ed., The Science of Surrealism - Assemblage Sculpture of Steve Brudniak. Austin TX: Merrid Zone, 2013
- Del Toro, Guillermo and Zicree, Marc. Guillermo Del Toro - Cabinet of Curiosities. London, England: Titan Books, 2013
- Brenner, Wayne Alan. Minerva's Wreck: Austin Arts Anthology, Austin TX: Café Armageddon, 2010.
- Branwyn, Gareth. Device Volume 2: Reconstructed, San Diego, CA: IDW Publishing, July 2009.
- Reese, Becky Duval. Texas 100: Selections from the El Paso Museum of Art, El Paso, TX: El Paso Museum of Art Foundation, 2006.
- Otten, William G. and Michelle W. Locke. The Legacy Continues, Corpus Christi, TX: Art Museum of South Texas, 2006.
- Morton, Jennifer. Belong: A TV Journalist's Search for Urban Culture: from Beirut to Bamako, from Havana to Ho Chi Minh City: Stories and Photos. Toronto, Ontario, Canada: Insomniac Press, 2004.
- Greene, Alison de Lima. Texas: 150 Works from the Museum of Fine Arts. NY, NY: Harry N. Abrams, October 1, 2000.
- Burns, Gerald. Shorter Poems. Normal, IL: Dalkey Archive Press, May 1993.
- Hendricks, Patricia D. and Becky Duval Reese. A Century of Sculpture in Texas 1889-1989. Austin, TX: University of Texas Press, 1989.
- McEvilley, Thomas. Another Reality. Houston, TX: Hooks-Epstein Galleries, June 1989.

==== Art documentary ====
- Ulteriaphobia: The Art of Steve Brudniak. Dir. Luke Savisky. Austin, TX: Klaus und Hans Productions, 1995, Video documentary.
- Indie Live Austin. “Steve Brudniak: Interview with Diana Brochin.” Austin, TX: ACTV, January 2010.
- Steve Brudniak – Noumenon. Dir. Wiley Wiggins. Austin, TX: 2008, Video documentary.
- Steve Brudniak. Dir. Andrew Nourse. Austin, TX: Andy Nourse Productions, 1998 Video documentary.

== Film ==
Brudniak began acting in and directing his own short films at the age of 13 and has appeared in over 50 films, notably Richard Linklater's Waking Life and Robert Rodriguez's Red 11 and Hypnotic; in video production and television shows including the Reelz Channels Murder Made Me Famous, AMC's The Son and El Rey Network's Rebel Without a Crew. In 2009 he produced, acted in and co-directed Eric Frodsham's Moments The Go feature film. Brudniak is also a voice actor for video games, narration, animation and radio and television commercials. He has appeared in advertising for Ford, PNC Bank, LegalZoom, Mido Lotto, Texas Tourism, Capital One, Indian Motorcycle, Cox Business and others. (See Actor Website under external links below for complete filmography)

=== Filmography ===
Selected films

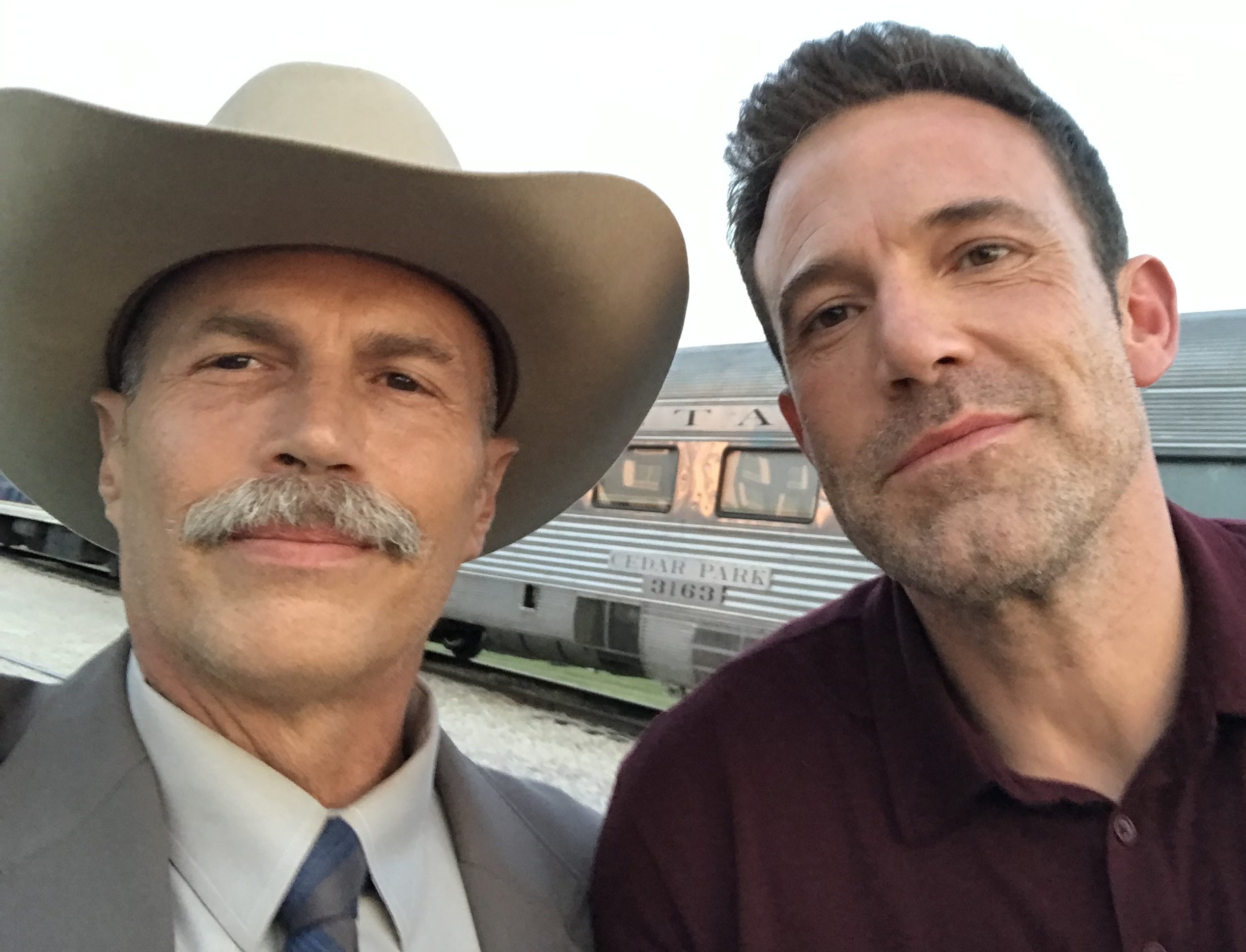
Steve Brudniak with Ben Affleck on the set of Hypnotic as the Texas Ranger.

Year	Film	Role	Director	Notes
2024	Stateside	Supporting	Zach Machen	
2024	Open Marriage	Lead	Zach Machen	
2023	Imitator of Everything	Lead	Logan Kelly	
2023	Lost Soulz	Supporting	Katherine Propper	
2023	Hypnotic	Supporting	Robert Rodriguez	
2022	It's Alive	Lead	Zach Machen	
2022	Walter	Lead	Jonathan Dryden-Jaffe	
2021	Man Seeking Man	Lead	Travis White	
2021	Birds	Lead	Katherine Propper	
2021	No Loss No Gain	Lead	Christian Rousseau	
2020	Pulpit	Lead	Zach Machen	
2020	Pizzagate Massacre	Support		
2020	Christ Almighty	Lead	Zach Machen	
2019	Godforsaken	Lead		
2019	Robert Jr.	Lead	Thomas Raker	
2018	The Iron Orchard	Supporting	Ty Roberts	
2018	The Last Supper	Lead	Zach Machen	
2018	Musa Malvada	Lead	Liz Tabish	
2018	Red 11	Lead	Robert Rodriguez	
2018	Cecelia	Lead	Liz Tabish	
2018	The Iron Orchard	Supporting	Ty Roberts	
2017	Calling	Lead	Artemis Anastasiadou	Austin Film Festival Selection
2017	Bonafide Beauty	Supporting	Samantha Schell	
2017	The Long Road Home	Lead	Alex Winker	
2017	Watchers	Supporting	Amadeus Gonzalez	
2016	Psychotropical	Lead	Liz Tabish	
2016	Clamps	Supporting	Zach Scott, Jill Bailey	
2016	Comfort	Lead	KC Coker	
2016	The Bridge	Lead	Colton Constanzo	
2016	The Dying Light	Lead	Jack Nassif	
2016	Promises	Supporting	Melody Brooke	
2015	Bunny and Non-Bunnyness	Lead	Ben Blanchard	Cannes Selection
2015	Ghost Valley	Lead	Georgetown Ray	Associate Producer
2015	Little Green Men	Supporting	Rob Larkin	
2015	Door to Door	Lead	Jarrod Yerkes	
2015	Wartorn	Lead	Harold Fisch	
2014	Carjacker	Supporting	Taylor Camarot	
2014	Bully Bully	Lead	DeRae Logan	
2014	Bye Bye Blackbird	Supporting	Gaia Bosignore	
2013	Moments the Go	Supporting	Eric Frodsham	Co-Director, Co-Producer
2012	Camp Kickitoo	Supporting	Rick Sternberg	
2002	Absinthe	Supporting	Marta Banda	Producer
2001	Waking Life	Supporting	Richard Linklater	Rotoscoped
1998	Two for Texas	Featured	Rod Hardy	Uncredited
1997	Parts of a Woman	Lead	Kathleen Collins	

Selected television

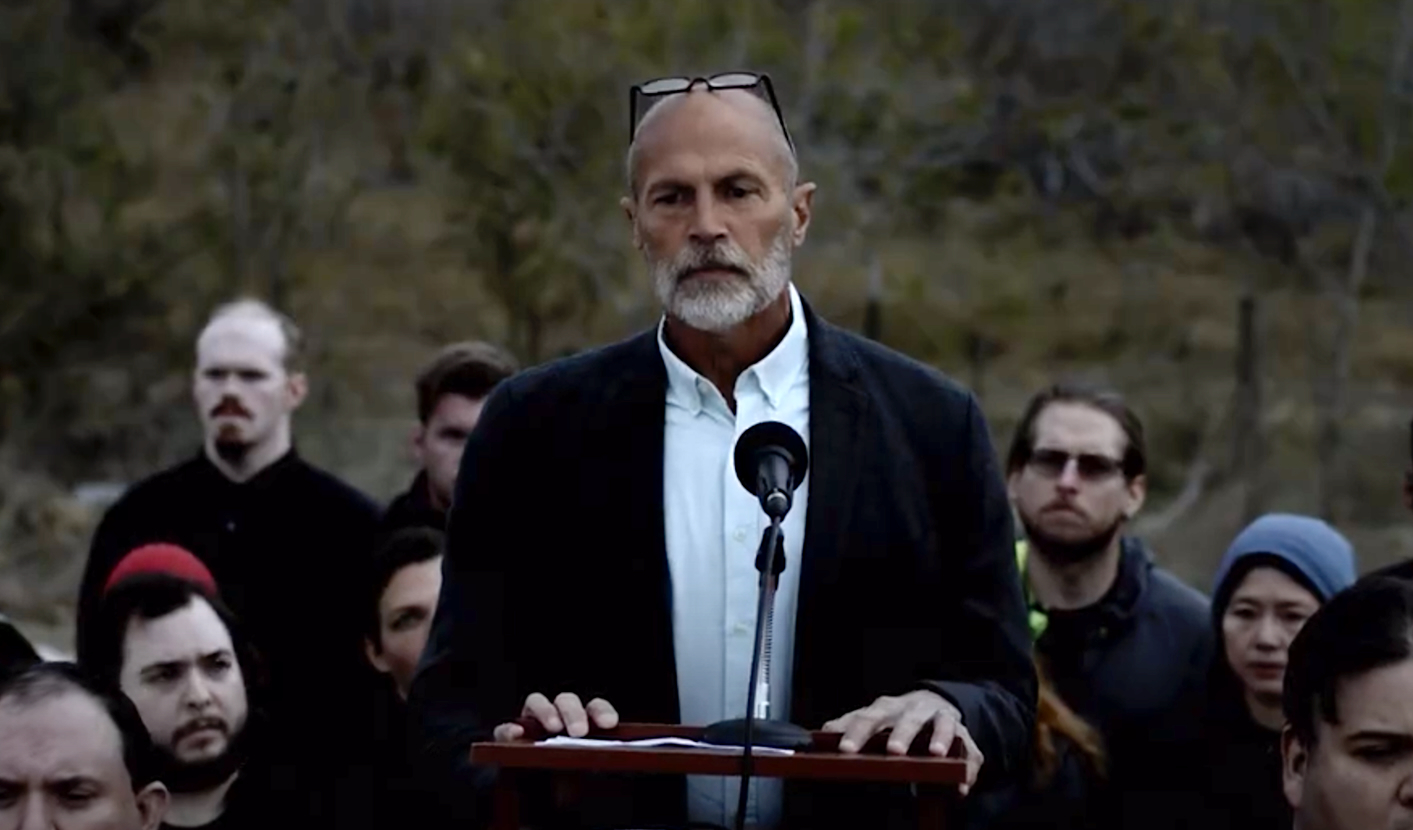
Still from Empire of Shadows as Sen. Jeremy Johnson (TV pilot).

Year	TV Show	Role	Director	Notes
2023	Empire of Shadows	Lead	Bejan Faramarz	TV pilot
2019	The Son	Guest Star	AMC	Series
2018	West World Interactive Experience			
2018	Rebel Without a Crew	Self	Robert Rodriguez	Series
2017	Annihilator	Guest Star	Julio Quintana	Series Teaser
2017	Is Game of Throngs a Soap Opera	Guest Star	Rooster Teeth	
2017	Murder Made Me Famous	Guest Star	Brad Osborne	Series
2016	Alabama Shakes	Principal	Zach Scott, Rachel Immaraj	Spec. Music Video
2016	Good Field	Principal	Zach Scott	Music Video
2004	Sir Richard	Self	BBC Television	Documentary
1995	Austin	Self	City TV	Documentary

Selected voice over

Year	Title	Role	Director	Notes
2024	Here Ya Go Bud	Various Characters	Wes Archer	Animation
2023	Capitol Ranch Real Estate	Principal	capitolranch.com	Commercial
2022	Jaston Williams, I Saw the Lights	Principal	Block House	Spot
2022	Hard West II	Principal	Creative Forms Games SA	Video Game
2021	Mido Lotto	Principal	Lemon Light	Commercial
2017	KingsIsle	Various Characters	KingsIsle Entertainment	Video Game
2016	Redeemer	Various Characters	Gambitious	Video Game
1985	Jack Mack and Rad Boy Go!	Various Characters	Wes Archer	Animation, Sound, Score

== Music ==
In 1976 he and guitar player Gerry Diaz formed the psychedelic rock group Spiny Normen and recorded an album at the Alvin Community College which was released four decades later on RidingEasy Records in 2018, with Brudniak on keyboards, flute, vocals, and some drums tracks. In 1981 he opened the Victorian Recording Studio in Houston, recording many of Houston's alternative, metal, folk, skate and punk groups. He also recorded and performed as a drummer in several bands in both Houston and Austin. He continues to record with Diaz in an experimental effort called Psylobison, playing theremin and Wavetech sound wave generator.

=== Discography ===
Year	Band	Title	Label	Notes
2020	Psylobison	Trancedelica	www.psylobison.com	Recorded 2008-20
2018	Spiny Normen	Spiny Normen	RidingEasy	Recorded 1979
2016	Spiny Normen	The Bell Park Loon (on Brown Acid: The Second Trip, compilation album)	RidingEasy	Recorded 1979
2010	Spiny Normen	The Sound of Younger Times (on Brining It All Back Again, compilation album)	Shroom Angel Records	Recorded 1979
