= Vandaveer =

- Origin: Washington D.C., United States
- Genres: Indie folk Alternative rock
- Labels: Supply and Demand Music; Alter K Records; WhiteSpace Records
- Members: Mark Charles Heidinger; Rose Guerin; J. Tom Hnatow; Robby Cosenza; Justin Craig

Vandaveer (Mark Charles Heidinger) is an American, Louisville, Kentucky–based indie-folk musical project, spearheaded by singer-songwriter Mark Charles Heidinger. Vandaveer has released five albums and three EPs since 2007, touring extensively throughout the US and Europe, logging over 1200 shows to date.

== History ==
Vandaveer began performing as a solo artist in late 2006, releasing his debut record, Grace & Speed, in the spring of 2007 on the now-defunct DC label, Gypsy Eyes Records. Rose Guerin began singing with Vandaveer in mid-2007 and has been a permanent fixture since. Robby Cosenza, Justin Craig and J. Tom Hnatow (all formerly of These United States) are regular collaborators with Vandaveer both in the studio and on stage. 2009 saw the release of Vandaveer's second full-length LP, Divide & Conquer, on the Supply & Demand Music label in the US and Alter K Records in Europe.

In 2010, Vandaveer self-released the five-song EP, A Minor Spell, a stark, lo-fi homemade recording centered largely around the vocal pairing of Heidinger and Guerin.

In April 2011, the band released their third full-length record, entitled Dig Down Deep, again via Supply & Demand Music and Alter K Records.

Vandaveer's fourth full-length LP, Oh, Willie Please... was released in April 2013, via Quack Media. The album, featuring J. Tom Hnatow on dobro, piano, pedal steel and acoustic guitar and Phillips Saylor on clawhammer banjo and acoustic guitar, is a collection of traditional folk songs, mostly murder ballads and songs of self-ruin, and was inspired in part by the band's participation in The 78 Project in December, 2011.

On February 16, 2016, Vandaveer released their fifth full-length LP, The Wild Mercury. Timothy Monger of AllMusic called The Wild Mercury "...perhaps his most personal and well-constructed collection yet." Dylan Weller of Splash Magazine gave the album a score of 8/10 and said, "Their old-timey sound of angelic harmonies combined with hearty rustic guitar leads to a titillating production."

Vandaveer appeared on Ringo Starr's 2017 album, Give More Love, backing the former Beatle on newly recorded versions of "Photograph" and the Beatles' "Don't Pass Me By."

Prior to Vandaveer, Heidinger was the primary vocalist, guitarist and songwriter for the Apparitions from Lexington, Kentucky.

The video for "Pretty Polly", the first single from Oh, Willie, Please... stars David Yow (The Jesus Lizard, Scratch Acid) and Tricia Vessey, and was directed by long-time Vandaveer video & film collaborator Jared Varava.

== Discography ==
- Grace & Speed (2007)
- Divide & Conquer (2009)
- A Minor Spell (EP) (2010)
- Dig Down Deep (2011)
- XMSEP2012 (2012)
- Oh, Willie, Please... (2013)
- The Wild Mercury (2016)
- Love Is Melancholy (EP) (2016)
