= Mark Charles (musician) =

- Born: Mark Charles Heidinger; Canton, Ohio, United States
- Genres: Indie; Folk; Rock; Alternative
- Member of: Vandaveer
- Formerly of: The Apparitions; These United States

Mark Charles (born Mark Charles Heidinger on May 8, 1977) is an American singer, songwriter, and multi-instrumentalist from Louisville, Kentucky. Primarily known as the principal singer and songwriter for the indie-folk outfit Vandaveer, Mark began a solo career under his given name in 2020.

== Biography ==
Mark was born in Canton, Ohio and grew up in and around Lexington, Kentucky. His music career began as the frontman for Kentucky-based indie-pop band The Apparitions. In 2004, Mark moved to Washington, D.C. and began performing under the name Vandaveer in early 2006. He also spent time as the bassist for DC's These United States.

Mark first founded his project Vandaveer as a solo venture, releasing their first album Grace & Speed in 2007. Later that year, vocalist Rose Guerin joined the project, officially making Vandaveer a duo. From mid-2007 through 2016, the group released five full-length LPs and three EPs, performing across the US and Europe with notable appearances at Glastonbury, SXSW, NPR's Mountain Stage, Forecastle, C3's Landmark Music Festival, among others. In 2015, Mark made the decision to move back to Kentucky to focus on his growing family, establishing Vandaveer's new home-base in Louisville.

On July 7, 2016, Vandaveer performed at Ringo Starr's annual Peace and Love gathering at Capitol Records in Los Angeles, celebrating Starr's 76th birthday. Following the performance, Vandaveer was invited to record as the backing band on two tracks of Ringo Starr's release Give More Love. They were featured on reimagined versions of Starr's hit song "Photograph", and The Beatles' "Don't Pass Me By", from their White Album. Give More Love was released in September 2017.

Vandaveer went on an extended hiatus in 2017, In 2018, Mark performed in the "house band" at Bonnaroo's SuperJam celebrating the music of Tom Petty, alongside My Morning Jacket's Patrick Hallahan and Tom Blankenship, Wilco's Pat Sansone, Craig Pfunder of VHS or Beta, Daniel Creamer of The Texas Gentlemen, and The Watson Twins.

Mark Charles began releasing solo music during the pandemic-plagued summer of 2020. His debut single, "Blood Will Always Be," was released on July 22, 2020, and was accompanied by a fan-sourced, pandemic-themed video directed by long-time film collaborator Jared Varava. Charles also released a cover of the famed Pete Seeger tune "Which Side Are You On," alongside fellow Louisvillian Shadwick Wilde in October 2020.
