= Christiane Seidel =

American-born German-Danish actress

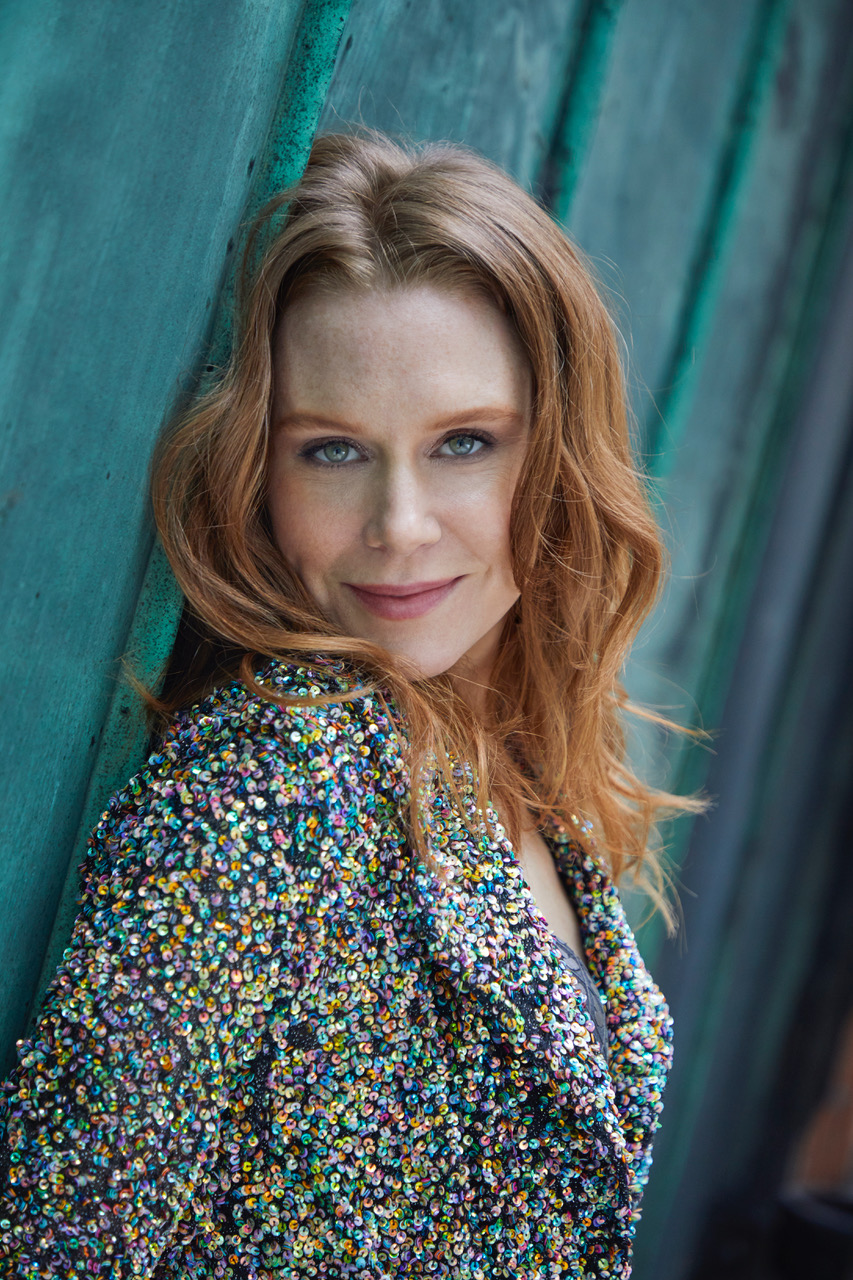
- Seidel in 2019
- Born: Christiane Julie Louise Seidel; April 3, 1988 (age 38); Wichita Falls, Texas, United States
- Education: The Lee Strasberg Theatre & Film Institute
- Occupation: Actress
- Years active: 2007–present
- Children: 2

Christiane Julie Louise Seidel (born April 3, 1988) is a German-Danish-American actress, having had roles in Boardwalk Empire (2011-2014), Schmidts Katze (2014), The Hollow (2016), Godless (2017), Fosse/Verdon and Human Capital (2019), and Paradise Highway in 2022.

== Early life ==
Seidel was born in Wichita Falls, Texas, to a Danish mother and a German father, who was serving in the navy. She also grew up in Denmark and Germany. Her first experience of acting came in a school nativity play. She followed her interest in acting by attending theatre camps, performing The Rocky Horror Picture Show in German, and attended for a semester at film school in Cape Town, South Africa. Seidel studied Media Management in Europe, before returning to the US to study at the Lee Strasberg Theatre and Film Institute in New York, to pursue her acting career.

== Career ==
Seidel's US television debut was as a Guest Star on NBC Universal's police drama Law & Order: Special Victims Unit's season 12 premiere episode in 2010. She starred as FBI Agent Sarah DeSoto in the noir-feature film, The Hollow in 2015, and as Sybille Ranisch in Schmidts Katze in 2014.

Seidel starred as Sigrid Mueller, the Norwegian wife to rogue Treasury Agent Nelson Van Alden (Michael Shannon) in the HBO TV drama series Boardwalk Empire from season 2 to season 5 (2012 – 2015). As of 2015, Seidel is a member of the Scandinavian American Theater Company, a theater company which has introduced several Scandinavian plays to the United States. In 2017, Seidel played Martha, a mysterious, free-spirited German stranger, in the Netflix mini-series Godless, starring alongside Michelle Dockery and Jeff Daniels.

In 2019, Seidel played the role of Hannah, mistress of Bob Fosse (Sam Rockwell) in FX television series Fosse/Verdon.

In 2020, she played Helen Deardorff in the Scott Frank directed The Queen's Gambit alongside Anya Taylor-Joy.

In 2022, Seidel stars in the Anna Gutto directed thriller movie Paradise Highway, in a cast which included Juliette Binoche and Morgan Freeman.

== Personal life ==
Seidel was pregnant during the filming of Godless in 2017 and is mother of twin boys.

== Filmography ==
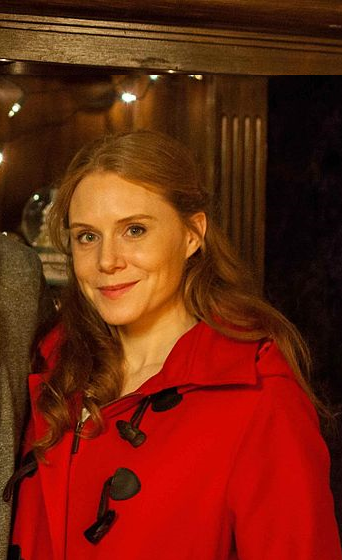
Christiane Seidel at the filming of Schmidts Katze in 2014

Year	Title	Role
2007	Far Out (short film)	Gillian
2008	Around	Foreign NYU Director
2009	Bordenia (short film)	Nancy O'Neill
2009	The Invisible Life of Thomas Lynch	Tina
2011	Tu & Eu (short film)	Julia
2011	Folkswagon (short film)	Eva
2012	The Left Hook (short film)	Nancy / Brenda
2014	Split End (short film)	Katha
2014	Schmidts Katze	Sybille Ranisch
2016	The Perfect Nothing (Short film)	Carrie
2016	The Hollow	Sarah Desoto
2017	Yellow Fever	(Supporting)
2017	Hard (short film)	Ellie
2018	16mins (Short film)	Lizzie
2019	The Big Shit (Short film)	Julie
2019	Human Capital	Godeep's Wife
2020	Tether (short film)	Delilah Desmond
2020	The Knot (Short film)	Eve
2022	Boon	Catherine
2022	Over/Under	Sheryl West
2022	Paradise Highway	Claire
2023	God's Time	Sydney

== Television ==
Year	Title	Role	Notes
2010	Law & Order: Special Victims Unit	Darla Pinnington	1 episode
2013	The Sonnet Project	Mother	1 episode
2011-2014	Boardwalk Empire	Sigrid Mueller	Recurring role, 4 seasons
2016	Jay & Pluto	Jessica	
2016	Dating Alarm	Annabelle	TV movie
2017	Royally	Caroline	1 episode
2017	Godless	Martha Bischoff	Recurring role, 6 episodes
2019	Fosse/Verdon	Hannah	2 episodes
2020	The Queen's Gambit	Helen Deardorff	3 episodes
2023	Magnum P.I.	Doctor Sally Cates	Season 5 episode 6: "Dead Ringer"

== Awards and nominations ==
Year	Award	Category	Nominated work	Result	Ref.
2018	Brightside Tavern Film Festival	Best Actress in a Horror/Thriller	16 mins	Nominated	
