= Boomslang (disambiguation) =

The boomslang is a species of arboreal snake from Africa.

Boomslang may also refer to:

- Boomslang (album), the first full-length album by Johnny Marr and the Healers
- Boomslang (comics), a supervillain in the Marvel comics universe, a member of the Serpent Society
- Boomslang (music festival), an annual music festival in Lexington, Kentucky
