= Hypnotic (2023 film) =

American film by Robert Rodriguez

- Theatrical release poster
- Directed by: Robert Rodriguez
- Screenplay by: Robert Rodriguez; Max Borenstein
- Story by: Robert Rodriguez
- Produced by: Mark Gill; Guy Botham; Lisa Ellzey; Jeff Robinov; John Graham; Racer Max; Robert Rodriguez
- Starring: Ben Affleck; Alice Braga; J. D. Pardo; Hala Finley; Dayo Okeniyi; Jeff Fahey; Jackie Earle Haley; William Fichtner
- Cinematography: Pablo Berron; Robert Rodriguez
- Edited by: Robert Rodriguez
- Music by: Rebel Rodriguez
- Production companies: Solstice Studios; Studio 8; Ingenious Media; Double R Productions; Troublemaker Studios
- Distributed by: Ketchup Entertainment; Relativity Media
- Release dates: March 12, 2023 (SXSW); May 12, 2023 (United States)
- Running time: 94 minutes
- Country: United States
- Language: English
- Budget: $65 million
- Box office: $16.3 million

Hypnotic is a 2023 American mystery action thriller film directed by Robert Rodriguez, who co-wrote the screenplay with Max Borenstein. The film stars Ben Affleck, Alice Braga, J. D. Pardo, Hala Finley, Dayo Okeniyi, Jeff Fahey, Jackie Earle Haley and William Fichtner. Rodriguez also produced, co-shot, and edited the film, while his sons Rebel Rodriguez and Racer Max served as composer and producer, respectively.

Hypnotic was released in the United States by Ketchup Entertainment and Relativity Media on May 12, 2023. The film received mixed reviews from critics and grossed $16 million.

== Plot ==
In a therapy session, Austin Police Detective Danny Rourke recounts the abduction of his seven-year-old daughter, Minnie, three years earlier. He and his partner, Nicks, act on an anonymous tip that a safe deposit box will be robbed, and witness a mysterious man give instructions to bystanders who immediately follow his commands. Rourke opens the box to find a picture of Minnie with the message "Find Lev Dellrayne", and the mysterious man escapes.

The tip is traced to fortune-teller Diana Cruz, who reveals that she and the mysterious man, Lev Dellrayne, are "Hypnotics", powerful hypnotists who escaped from the secretive government "Division" that trained them. Rourke is mysteriously immune to her mind-control abilities, and Dellrayne hypnotizes Nicks into attacking them, forcing Cruz to kill Nicks. Pursued by Dellrayne and law enforcement under his influence, Rourke and Cruz flee to Mexico.

They visit Jeremiah, a former Division member who explains that Dellrayne stole a Division weapon known as "Domino". Having wiped his own memory to keep Domino hidden, Dellrayne left himself "triggers" to recall its location and regain his hypnotic power. Jeremiah is revealed to be Dellrayne in disguise, and corners Rourke and Cruz by controlling an angry crowd. Rourke discovers his own hypnotic power, turning the crowd against Dellrayne and escaping with Cruz.

Rourke and Cruz seek out River, a reclusive hacker who infiltrates the Division database and learns that Rourke's ex-wife, Vivian, is a Division agent. Dellrayne calls Rourke, who struggles to resist his command to kill Cruz, and Rourke and Cruz sleep together. Rourke discovers that "Domino" is actually Minnie; she is the daughter of two powerful hypnotics, Rourke and Vivian, who has been posing as "Cruz".

Rourke realizes that his life as a detective is a charade, a hypnotic "construct" created inside a Division facility. His memories have been altered, and Vivian, Nicks, River, and everyone else he has encountered are Division agents led by Dellrayne. Minnie was born and raised within the Division, but Rourke hid her to stop her from becoming their weapon. He wiped his memory to protect her, so the Division has repeatedly forced him to relive the constructed scenario to locate Minnie.

Rourke's mind is again "reset", bringing him back to the therapy session and reliving the same events, but his powers allow him to awaken from the construct and escape. The Division realizes that "Find Lev Dellrayne" refers to an address on "Deer Valley Lane", where Rourke hid Minnie with her grandparents, Carl and Thelma. At their ranch, Rourke is reunited with his daughter, but Vivian soon arrives with Dellrayne and his agents.

With her memories restored by Minnie, Vivian realizes she aided Rourke and Minnie's escape and wiped her own memory, keeping Minnie hidden until she could grow powerful enough to defeat the entire Division. Minnie provided the "Find Lev Dellrayne" photo to lead the Division to her, and Dellrayne realizes they are inside another construct she created. After forcing Dellrayne and his agents to kill each other, Minnie and her family celebrate their newfound freedom.

In a mid-credits scene, the family departs as Carl stays behind, and is revealed to be Dellrayne. Having used his powers to switch places with Carl, who was killed instead, Dellrayne continues his hunt for the family.

== Cast ==
- Ben Affleck as Danny Rourke
- Alice Braga as Diana Cruz
- Hala Finley as Minnie Rourke (10 years old)
  - Ionie Olivia Nieves as Minnie Rourke (7 years old)
- Dayo Okeniyi as River
- Jeff Fahey as Carl
- Zane Holtz as Trout
- Ruben Cabaalero as Watkins
- Jackie Earle Haley as Jeremiah
- William Fichtner as Dellrayne
- J. D. Pardo as Randy Nicks
- Kelly Frye as Viv
- Sandy Avila as Thelma
- Ryan Ryusaki as Bong
- Steve Brudniak as Texas Ranger

== Production ==
=== Development ===
Robert Rodriguez had written the initial screenplay for Hypnotic back in 2002, calling it "one of my favorite stories". In November 2018, Rodriguez was confirmed to direct, with Max Borenstein rewriting the original script for Studio 8. In November 2019, it was reported that Studio 8 would co-produce with Solstice Studios, which had domestic distribution rights.

=== Casting ===
In November 2019, Ben Affleck was set to star. In May 2021, Alice Braga was added, with filming set to begin on September 20 in Austin, Texas. In September 2021, Hala Finley joined the cast. In October 2021, it was reported Dayo Okeniyi, William Fichtner and JD Pardo had signed on.

=== Filming ===
Principal photography began in Austin on September 27, 2021, and concluded on November 19 of the same year.

=== Post-production ===
In April 2022, Rodriguez confirmed that, similar to his previous films, he and his family members collaborated on the project:

My son [Rebel] now is my full-time composer. My other son [Racer Max] is my co-writer/producer. My daughter [Rhiannon] is doing storyboards. My other son's [Rogue] doing the animatics, because he's using his game engine stuff that he designed the sets for Heroes with. And then my other son [Rocket] edits with me. So, it's a family affair.

== Release ==
Hypnotic was originally set to be released theatrically in the United States by Solstice Studios. In March 2023, it was reported that Ketchup Entertainment would serve as the domestic distributor instead. A "work-in-progress" cut of the film was screened at 2023 South by Southwest Film & TV Festival on March 12, 2023. Hypnotic was released by Ketchup Entertainment and Relativity Media in the United States on May 12, 2023.

The film was released for digital platforms on May 30, 2023, followed by a Blu-ray and DVD release on February 13, 2024.

== Reception ==
=== Box office ===
Released alongside Book Club: The Next Chapter, the film made $940,000 from 2,118 theaters in its first day. It went on to debut to $2.4 million, finishing in sixth. Hypnotic grossed $4.5 million in the United States and Canada, and $11.8 million in other territories, for a worldwide total of $16.3 million.

=== Critical response ===
On the review aggregator website Rotten Tomatoes, 32% of 114 critics' reviews are positive, with an average rating of 4.7/10. The website's consensus reads: "Although Hypnotic isn't without glimmers of inspiration, the ultimate effect of this often clunky crime caper will be to leave you feeling rather sleepy." Metacritic, which uses a weighted average, assigned the film a score of 53 out of 100, based on 31 critics, indicating "mixed or average" reviews. Audiences polled by CinemaScore gave the film an average grade of "C+" on an A+ to F scale, while those polled by PostTrak gave it a 69% positive score, with 44% saying they would definitely recommend it.

Mark Kermode of The Observer gave the film a score to two out of five, saying that Rodriguez and Borenstein "go on a thematic shoplifting spree, snatching psychic pushes from Stephen King's Firestarter, dozy psycho-crime plot twists from Primal Fear, and Philip K Dick false memories from Blade Runner, Total Recall et al." Danny Leigh of the Financial Times also gave the film a score of two out of five, writing, "The mood is gun-happy and conspiracy-minded, but the real killer is what feels like 80 percent of the running time being spent with Affleck and co-stars standing in rooms explaining the plot." Kevin Maher of The Times gave the film a score of one out of five, writing, "It's sloppily executed, without a hint of dramatic tension."

Richard Roeper of the Chicago Sun-Times gave the film a score of three out of five, calling it "An uneven, at times mesmerizing and dazzling mind-bender of a psychological thriller that plays like a drive-in movie version of a Christopher Nolan film." Glenn Kenny of The New York Times wrote, "The movie is, if nothing else, ruthlessly efficient enough in delivering its crowd-pleasing bits that truly starving suspense genre hounds, at least, won't necessarily mind." Brian Lowry of CNN said the film "becomes a little strained over its final act, but for the most part it's fast-paced and clever, capitalizing on Rodriguez's economical filmmaking style".
