= David Strackany =

American singer-songwriter

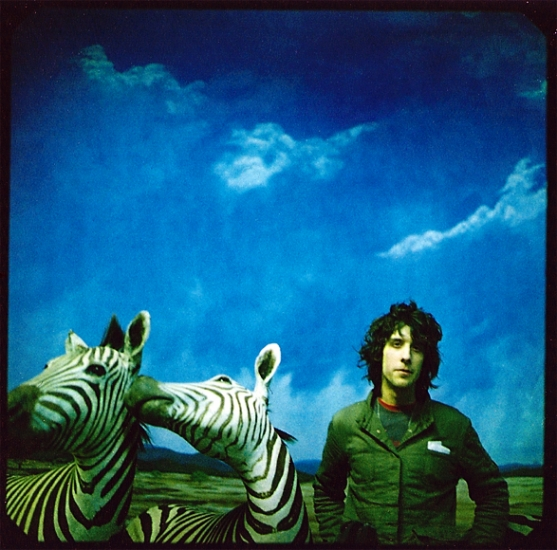

Background information
- Origin: Elgin, Illinois, U.S.
- Genres: Indie; Folk; Psychedelic folk Electro-folk
- Years active: 2004–present
- Label: Partisan Records
- Formerly of: These United States
- Website: partisanrecords.com/artists/paleo

David Andrew Strackany, aka Paleo, is an American singer of folk music who is notable for writing a song every day for 365 days using a "half-size children's guitar" while living out of his car and being essentially homeless. He plays acoustic guitar and sings and in 2005 began touring the United States. He has a recording arrangement with an indie music label named Partisan Records.

== Music career ==
=== Beginnings ===
Strackany was born in 1981. He graduated from college but was dissatisfied with service-level jobs and so he decided to become a songwriter. He chose the moniker Paleo after seeing a paleontology exhibit of butterflies in Prague. He explained:

"(Paleo) is a Greek word that means old and is the opposite of "neo," which means new. It reminds me that what I'm doing is old ... People have been doing rain dances and beating on drums, humming, and singing lullabies to their children since mankind began." – Paleo, in an interview, 2010.

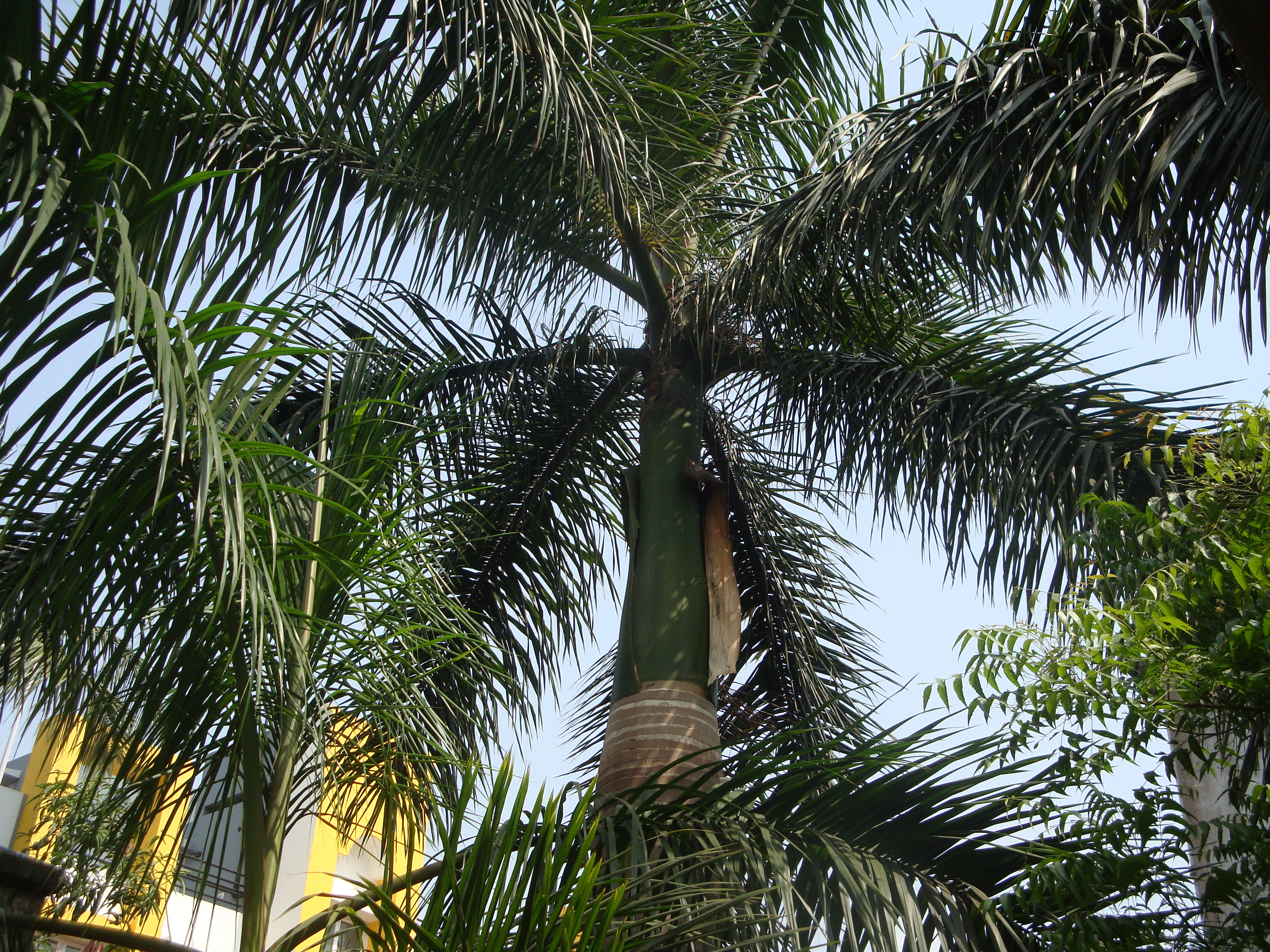
Palm tree; according to Paleo, it looks like an ignited match.

He exchanged his collection of music CDs for a tattoo. In a subsequent interview, he recalled that he thought he could "make a living making music" but wasn't sure how this would happen. He has had a variety of musical influences from pop culture but one in particular that stands out is the musical Jesus Christ Superstar which he describes as a guilty pleasure. He has a creative temperament, and in an interview, described himself as living "inwardly":

"It's all pretty crazy. I mean, a palm tree is pretty crazy. If you look at a palm tree, it looks like a match with green fire coming out of it, a long match that you light a fireplace with." – Paleo, 2010, in an interview.

He explained after a performance in Syracuse, New York on April 7, 2007, that his half-sized children's guitar was more efficient since it allowed him to play while driving; he named the guitar "Oh! Susanna" after the Stephen Foster song.

=== Debut ===
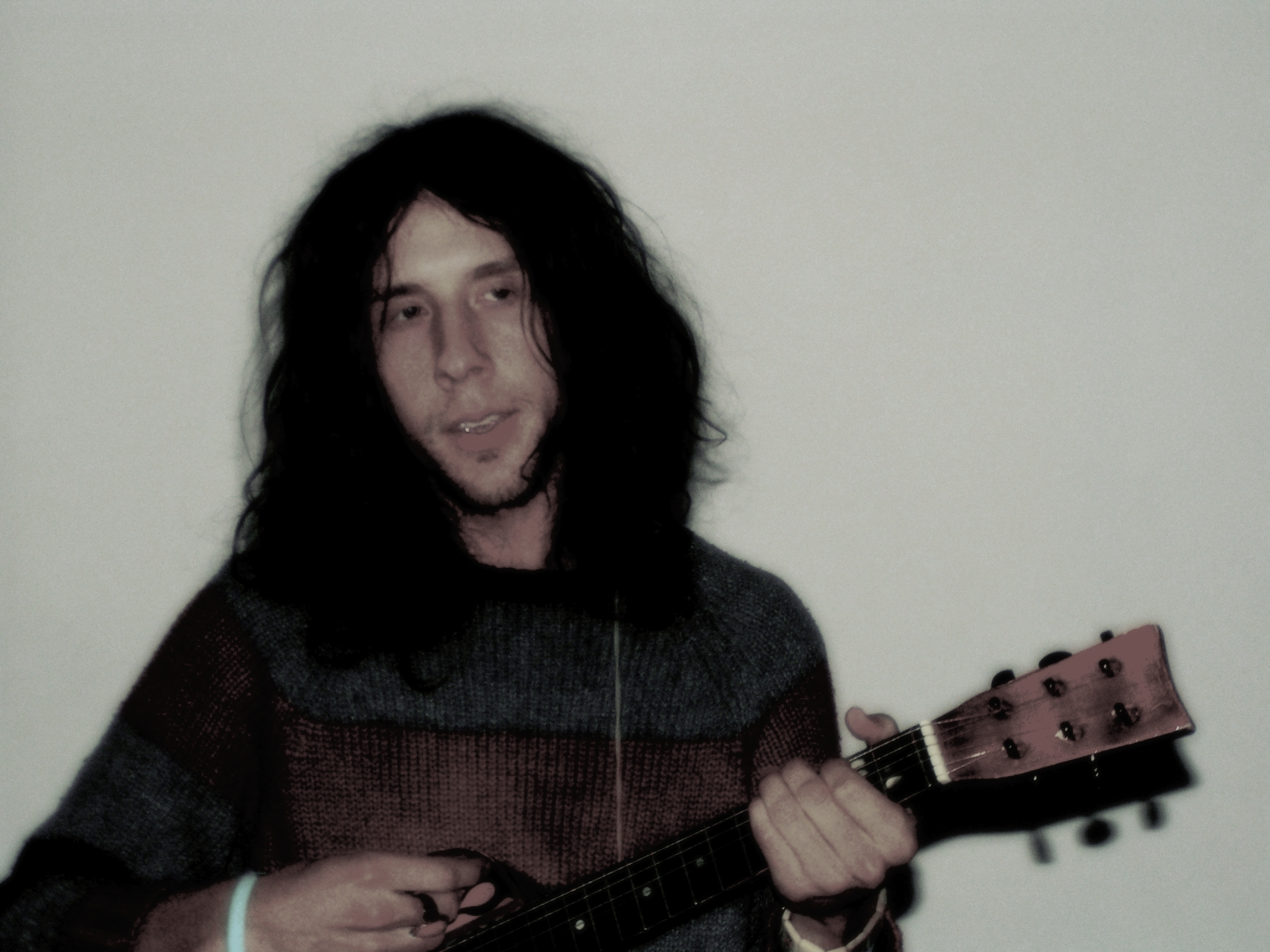
Paleo during the performance in Syracuse, NY on April 7, 2007.

Strackany's initial approach was to record an album, then he learned to book his own performances:

I then began the process of trying to figure out how to book shows and tour. I slowly pieced together some shows in 2005. I had some breaks where people gave me a chance, and that was nice. I've been sort of at it ever since. That's where I'm at right now, still making records and still making music. -- Paleo, in an interview

Strackany recorded his debut album Misery, Missouri in early October 2004. The record was largely folk in nature but with more elaborate arrangements and instrumentation, and was self-released. The entire session was executed with one microphone. 1000 copies were pressed independently and it is now out of print, with no published plans to re-release the work, according to a description on his website. He used simple chord progressions which were "uncomplicated sonically" but with lyrics akin to a 17th-century poet, according to one account. He found that his best lyrics often come up in everyday conversation but by putting what he finds in an "unfamiliar context", the words can become very significant. He wrote song, produced his music, booked shows, and traveled around the country while living out of his car. He performed, and continues to perform, extensively; according to one account, he has played about 150 shows per year since 2005.

=== Song a Day project ===
Strackany generated media attention by doing a year-long write-a-song-a-day project. He did this while touring the United States nationally and driving more than 50,000 miles from Easter Day on April 16, 2006, to April 15, 2007, and playing more than 200 concerts. Paleo's "The Song Diary" project was similar to a feat achieved by playwright Suzan-Lori Parks in 2003 and it was covered by news sources including USA Today, Entertainment Weekly, Magnet Magazine, Paste Magazine, the Chicago Sun Times, the New York Post, NPR Morning Edition, The Washington Post, The Boston Globe, in addition to regional and local papers. A National Public Radio music critic wrote:

Every day for a year, he wrote, recorded and posted a song on his Web site. He hasn't been writing songs in his bedroom, either. During the last year, Paleo drove more than 50,000 miles and played more than 200 concerts. Along the way, he wrote the lyrics and played his guitar — in his van, backstage, whenever he could find a moment. Paleo calls his yearlong project a song diary, but if these songs are all autobiographical, then the year has taken a toll on his psyche. -- Deborah Amos in NPR, 2007

Paleo made rules for himself:

1. The Song Diary would end if he skipped even one day.
2. Each song had to be recorded before sunrise.
3. No songs could be re-recorded.
4. 'Sunday Prayer' songs were new lyrics sung with the same melody every Sunday.

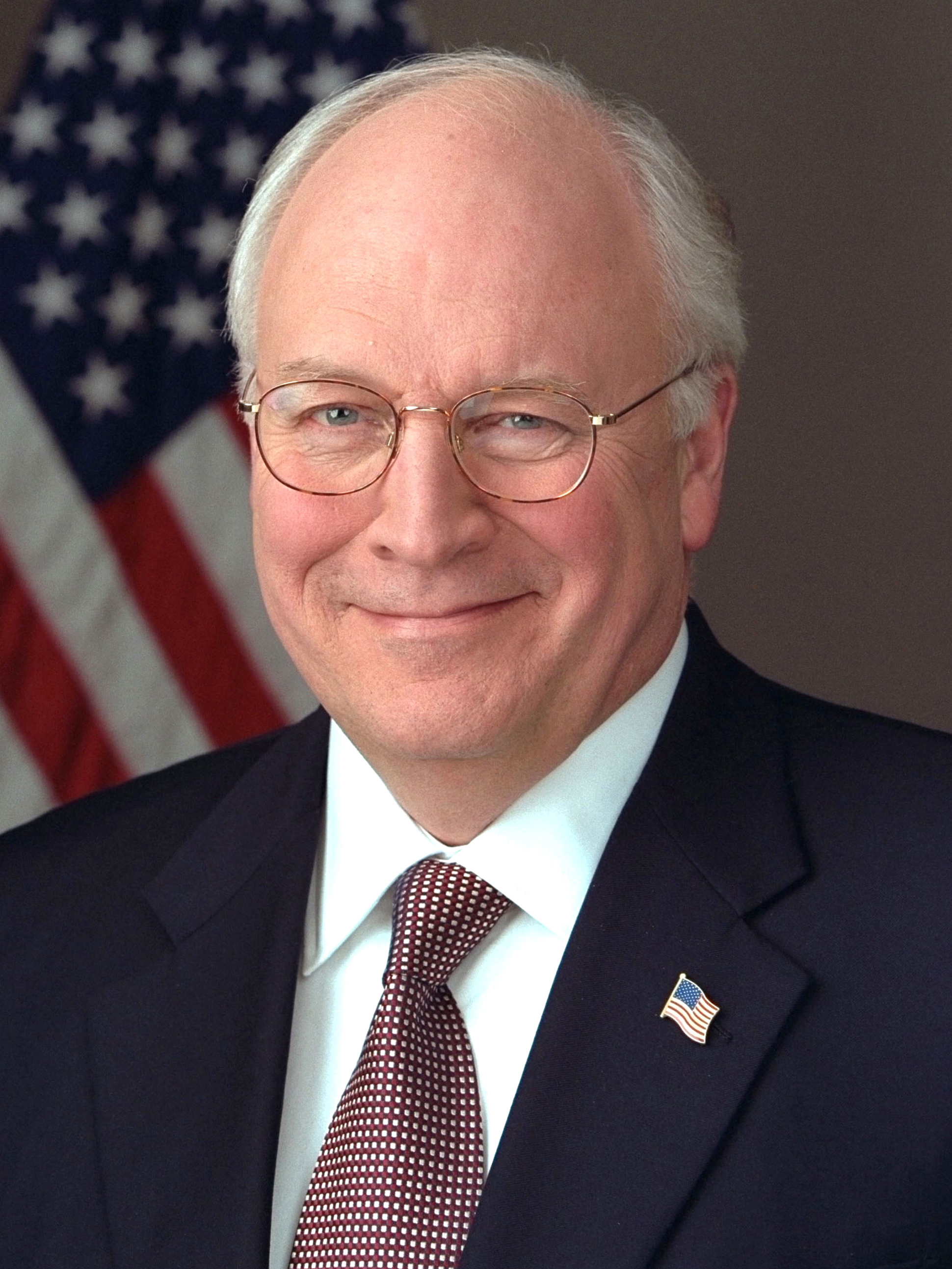
Paleo received a letter of congratulations from VP Dick Cheney after completing his marathon yearlong song-a-day project.

He refused to sleep "until he had completely documented a new song for that day regardless of the circumstances," according to his recollection. The result was an "enormous body of work" with an "outlook of unfettered optimism." It is downloadable in its entirety from his website. Paste Magazine described it as "a streetfight of freakish prolificacy." He received a letter of congratulations from American vice-president Dick Cheney who had heard about the project. Cheney wrote:

Writing 365 songs in 365 days is a feat that took determination and dedication. -- Dick Cheney, 2007

Strackany described the project as psychoanalytically transformative in a personal way:

I feel like a completely different person than when I started out. It was grace, like I died and came back. My perspective on my relationship to love and to art and to my family has totally changed. You have to consider that I spent every second of every day of a whole year in a sort of constant state of catharsis, what seemed like never-ending auto-psychoanalysis. I walked into the Diary maybe a little desperate, certainly insecure, and I walked out on a cloud. -- Paleo, 2007

Strackany sees a benefit to creativity in songwriting when there are limits attached. He emphasized that boundaries are a "great way to excite your creativity" and suggested, in an example, that cutting off two of the guitar's six strings could help a writer creatively. He noted that "too much freedom can be every bit the cage."

=== Collaborations ===
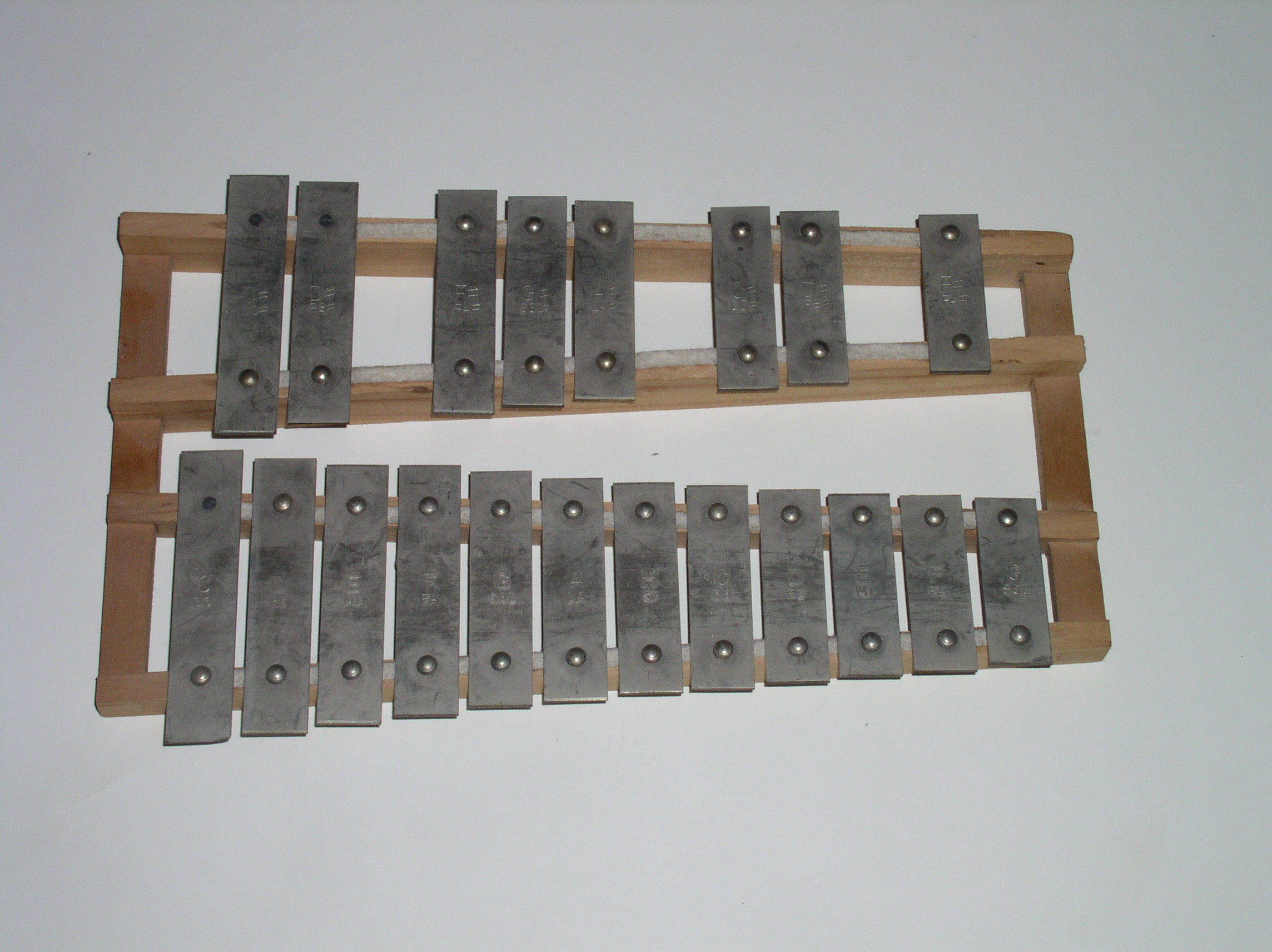
The glockenspiel is one of many instruments that Paleo plays.

Strackany worked with songwriter Jesse Elliott on a Washington, D.C.–based music project entitled These United States. He helped Elliott develop the band's first album, and acted primarily as the band's producer as well as playing a majority of the instruments on the band's "psychotropic debut record." The band wrote "novelistic songs packed with dense narratives and loose, ragged-edged folk, rock and Americana". Strackany's contribution was as a multi-instrumentalist who offered "skillfully mixed, multi-instrumental support with a range in keys, drums, accordion, bass and vibraphone," according to NPR. The Village Voice described Strackany's arrangements as "psychedelic" and noted that instruments he played included the "vibes, glockenspiel, mandolin, and lots of off-kilter keyboards."

Elliott described Strackany as a songwriter who has "stared almost directly at the human soul."

=== Solo career ===
In 2007, Strackany did soundtrack work on the feature film In Search of a Midnight Kiss. In 2009, he won a record deal with Brooklyn-based Partisan Records. He once described making music as a vice. He continues to tour extensively.

You can get desensitized to the pace of touring after a while, things that other people might tune into. You may become oblivious to so much because it's happening so quickly. You almost have to shield yourself a little bit from it, otherwise it's exhausting to take it all in. -- Paleo, 2010, in an interview

According to one account, Strackany repeated his song-a-day project in 2010. In 2011, he is no longer technically "homeless", but when he is not touring, he lives in Iowa City; a second source suggests he lives in Davenport, Iowa.

Strackany repeated his songdiary feat in 2018.

=== Music reviews ===
- NPR music critic Deborah Amos suggested that Paleo's year-long one-a-day songwriting project took a "toll on his psyche", shifting back and forth between hope and despair.
- Boise Weekly critic Elijah Jensen wrote that Strackany "explores interiors of the human mind, the dissolution of love, the value of success and does so poetically with such entrancing use of metaphor."
- Daytrotter's Sean Moeller described him as a Poet Laureate in 2007.

== Discography ==
- Misery, Missouri (2005)
- The Song Diary (2006–2007)
- Pedestrian Crossing (Recorded 2006 and released 2009)
- A New Day (2010 Cassette tape)
- A View Of The Sky, Partisan Records (2010)
- Fruit of the Spirit, 2011, Partisan Records
- Bloodletter (2014)
