= Hala Finley =

American actress (born 2009)

- Born: May 18, 2009 (age 17); Gladstone, Missouri, U.S.
- Occupation: Actress
- Years active: 2014–present

Hala Finley (born May 18, 2009) is an American actress. She is best known for her roles in Man with a Plan (2016–2020) as Emme Burns and in We Can Be Heroes (2020) as Ojo.

== Early life ==
Finley was born on May 18, 2009, in Gladstone, Missouri, the daughter of a Libyan mother, Somiya Finley. It was from her mother, who has had a modest screen career of her own, that Finley first acquired her interest in acting. Moreover, the two appeared together in Hala's film debut, the 2014 Kansas-City-filmed short, Counter Parts. The following year, the family relocated to Los Angeles, in furtherance not only of Finley's screen prospects and her mother's, but also those of her older brother, who wished to learn cinematography.

== Career ==
In Los Angeles, Finley appeared in print and TV commercials. In 2015, she played the lead role in Grammy. Gruesome Magazine said she was "adorable". In 2016, at the age of seven, Finley appeared in Man with a Plan as Emme Burns, the youngest of Adam Burns's (Matt LeBlanc) children. In 2018, she played Jody Altmyer in Back Roads, for which she received a positive review. Nerdy Babble said she was "most surprising part of this entire experience", saying "she blew my expectations out of the water. ... [She was] adorable and endlessly endearing." In February 2020, Finley was cast in Mandalay Pictures's Shelter.

In September 2021, Finley joined Ben Affleck and Alice Braga in action-thriller film Hypnotic, reuniting with director Robert Rodriguez.

In 2022, she starred in Paradise Highway, which centers around human trafficking. Finley portrays Leila, who is trafficked in an attempt to save another character. The A.V. Club praised her performance, stating: "Finley eschews cuteness as much as possible, playing Leila almost as feral at the beginning—a writhing mass of gutteral screams and uncontrolled bodily functions, designed to be as distasteful as possible to would-be kidnappers."

== Filmography ==
=== Film ===
Year	Title	Role	Notes	Ref.
2014	Counter Parts	Twins	Short film	
2015	Grammy	Child	Short film	
2016	Letters from a Father	Young Marie	Short film	
2018	Back Roads	Jody Altmyer		
2020	Bobbleheads: The Movie	Audrey (voice)		
2020	We Can Be Heroes	Ojo		
2022	Unplugging	Elizabeth "Blizzard" Dewerson		
2022	Paradise Highway	Leila		
2023	Hypnotic	Minnie		
2024	Venom: The Last Dance	Echo Moon		
2025	The Roses	Older Hattie Rose		

=== Television ===
Year	Title	Role	Notes	Ref.
2016–2020	Man with a Plan	Emme Burns	Main role	
2018	American Housewife	Harriet	Episode: "Highs and Lows"	
2019	Teachers	Delia	Episode: "The Tell-Tale Cart"	
2022	Magnum P.I.	Ella Vaughn	Episode: "Remember Me Tomorrow"	
2024	Star Wars: Skeleton Crew	Hayna	Episode: "Can't Say I Remember No At Attin"	
