= Schmidts Katze =

2015 film

- Film poster
- Directed by: Marc Schlegel
- Written by: Stephanie Toewe-Rimkeit
- Starring: Michael Lott; Christiane Seidel
- Release date: 24 September 2015
- Running time: 90 minutes
- Country: Germany
- Language: German

Schmidts Katze is a 2015 German comedy film directed by Marc Schlegel. It was one of eight films shortlisted by Germany to be their submission for the Academy Award for Best Foreign Language Film at the 88th Academy Awards, but it lost out to Labyrinth of Lies.

== Cast ==
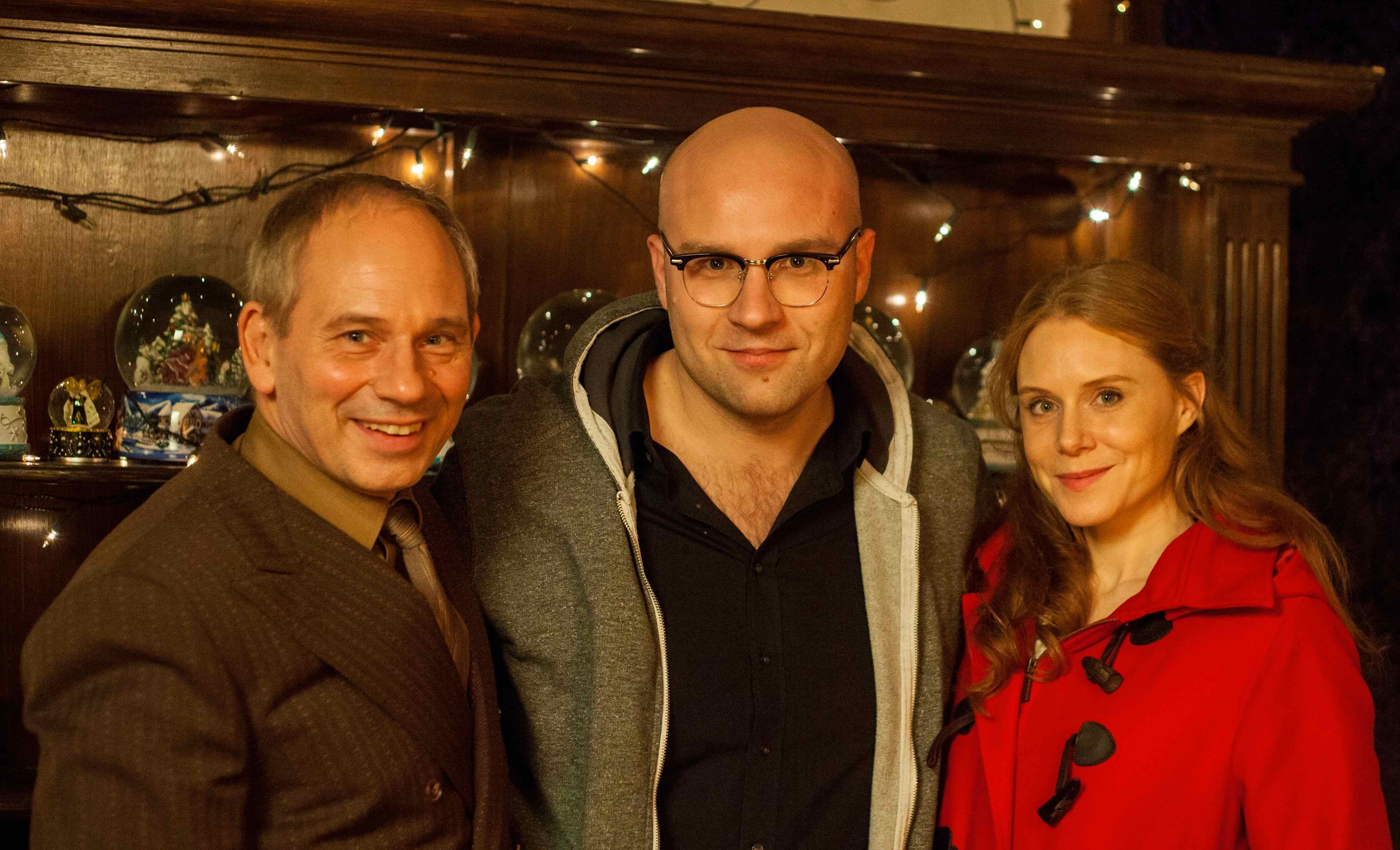
Michael Lott, Marc Schlegel und Christiane Seidel on the set of Schmidts Katze, November 11, 2014

- Michael Lott as Werner Schmidt
- Christiane Seidel as Sybille
- Michael Kessler as Uwe
- Franziska Traub as Inge
- Alexander E. Fennon as Frehse
- Volker Michalowski as Polizist Plötzke
- Georg Alfred Winter as Polizist Gerber
