= WRFL =

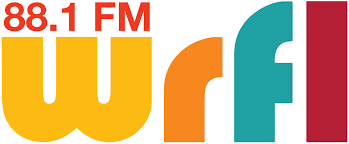
- Lexington, Kentucky; United States
- Broadcast area: Lexington–Fayette metropolitan area
- Frequency: 88.1 MHz
- Branding: WRFL 88.1

Programming
- Language: English
- Format: College radio
- Affiliations: Pacifica Radio Network

Ownership
- Owner: University of Kentucky

History
- First air date: March 7, 1988
- Call sign meaning: Radio Free Lexington

Technical information
- Licensing authority: FCC
- Facility ID: 54586
- Class: C3
- ERP: 7900 watts
- HAAT: 87 meters (285 ft)
- Transmitter coordinates: 38°2′19.3″N 84°30′15.8″W

Links
- Public license information: Public file; LMS
- Website: wrfl.fm

WRFL, Lexington (Radio Free Lexington) is a 7900-watt college radio station that broadcasts live, 24 hours a day, from the University of Kentucky campus in Lexington, Kentucky. The station has broadcast at 88.1 MHz on the FM radio band since 1988 and prior to COVID-19, without automation.

WRFL is operated at all times by volunteer deejays, consisting largely of University of Kentucky students and also of some Lexington community members. A large portion of its programming is left up to the deejays, who plan their own shows in either a general or genre-specific format. Music played on WRFL is strictly "alternative," here defined as material which cannot be heard on other radio stations or through traditional, commercial outlets. This requirement is not only part of the station's culture and character, but is also mandated by the station's educational U.S. Federal Communications Commission license.

WRFL also has a commitment to public affairs and the community, featuring student-produced news programs, student-produced sports programs, and broadcasting the syndicated progressive news program Democracy Now! five days a week.

The station has a strong connection with the Lexington music scene and highlights underground and local artists weekly through its live music program, WRFL-Live, as well as on many of the stations other shows.

The Gavin Report listed WRFL in the top 2% of college radio stations in the nation.

Current slogans of the station include "All the way to the left," and "The only alternative left."

== History ==
Broadcasting began in 1988 using a 250-watt tower. In 2007, the FCC approved the station for an upgrade to 7,900 watts, which increased its terrestrial broadcast considerably. To finance the cost of a new tower and transmitter, various managerial administrations campaigned under the title, "Build the Tower, Boost the Power". In May 2010, the old 250-watt tower was dismantled and the new 7900-watt tower was installed in its current place atop the Patterson Office Tower on June 1, 2010.

The station has ties to the noise music community as several of its current and former DJs are members of bands such as Hair Police and Wolf Eyes. The station is thanked in the liner notes of recent Apples in Stereo albums, and has ties to the Elephant Six Collective.

An extensive oral history of WRFL has been catalogued and is publicly available via the University of Kentucky's Oral History Library.

WRFL has used many slogans throughout its history, many of which allude to its broadcast frequency on the leftmost portion of the dial and its unofficial social and political tendencies. Examples include:

- Revolutions don't happen between commercial breaks
- All the way to the left
- The only alternative left

== See also ==
- Boomslang (music festival)
- Campus radio
- List of college radio stations in the United States
