= God's Time =

2023 American film by Daniel Antebi

- Poster
- Directed by: Daniel Antebi
- Written by: Daniel Antebi
- Produced by: Emily Korteweg; Reid Hannaford; Andrew Hutcheson
- Starring: Ben Groh; Dion Costelloe; Liz Caribel Sierra
- Cinematography: Jeff Melanson
- Edited by: Sara Shaw; Jon Poll; Daniel Antebi
- Music by: Brian Reitzell
- Production companies: Watch This Ready; Topic Studios
- Distributed by: IFC Films
- Release dates: June 10, 2022 (Tribeca); February 24, 2023 (United States)
- Running time: 83 minutes
- Country: United States
- Language: English
- Box office: $10,033

God's Time is a 2023 American comedy drama film written and directed by debutant Daniel Antebi. Produced by Watch This Ready and Topic Studios, the film stars Ben Groh, Dion Costelloe and Liz Caribel Sierra in lead roles.

It premiered at the 2022 Tribeca Festival on June 10, 2022, and was released in limited theaters and video on demand on February 24, 2023, where it received positive reviews from critics.

== Plot ==
Recovering addict Dev follows fellow recovering addict Regina to meetings where she shares the story of her ex boyfriend Russell who kicked her out of her home. Dev is often accompanied with his best friend Luca.

After several meetings, Regina changes the story about Russell from hoping he will recover to fantasizing about killing him.

"Dev and Luca set off on a 24-hour odyssey through pandemic-gripped New York City to stop Regina from making a mistake."

== Cast ==
- Ben Groh as Dev
- Dion Costelloe as Luca
- Liz Caribel Sierra as Regina
- Jared Abrahamson as Russel
- Christiane Seidel as Sydney
- Natalie Woolams-Torres as Maria
- John Pope as Robert (Doorman)

== Production ==
According to director Daniel Antebi, God's Time was not intended to be his first film. He had been planning on making another film for years. Then, after the COVID-19 pandemic came, he got the idea of God's Time, which he described as "a bit of a fever dream", in terms of writing and producing. He started writing the first draft in July 2020 and completed it within two weeks after which principal photography began that October in New York City. It ended on November 23 that year.

== Release ==
God's Time had its premiere at the 2022 Tribeca Film Festival on June 10, 2022. IFC Films acquired North American distribution rights and released the film in limited theaters and video on demand on February 24, 2023.

== Reception ==
=== Box office ===
The film grossed $6,283 at 17 theaters in its opening weekend. It went on to make a total of $10,033 in the United States.

=== Critical response ===
The review aggregator website Rotten Tomatoes reported an approval rating of 57% with an average rating of 6.4/10, based on 23 reviews. On Metacritic, the film has an average score of 51 out of 100, based on 6 critics, indicating "mixed or average" reviews.

Jesse Hassenger, in his review for Paste, praised the film by writing "God’s Time may seem like a slight, calling-card undertaking at 83 minutes—or even a touch self-congratulatory as it rolls fake ads and footage of its actors hamming it up over the end credits. But beneath its bravado, there’s a real sense of New York life." In her review for Cinemacy, Morgan Rojas wrote "God's Time offers a unique perspective on recovery by allowing audiences to find humor in the darkest of places." She further wrote "It’s fast-paced and hip, fitting squarely into the growing category of films for the Euphoria crowd."
