= Paradise Highway =

2022 film by Anna Gutto

- Theatrical release poster
- Directed by: Anna Gutto
- Written by: Anna Gutto
- Produced by: Claudia Bluemhuber; Georgia Bayliff; Michael Leahy; Anna Gutto
- Starring: Juliette Binoche; Frank Grillo; Hala Finley; Cameron Monaghan; Veronica Ferres; Christiane Seidel; Morgan Freeman; Connor Adkins
- Cinematography: John Christian Rosenlund
- Edited by: Christian Siebenherz
- Music by: Anné Kulonen
- Production companies: Grindstone Entertainment Group; Silver Reel
- Distributed by: Lionsgate
- Release date: July 29, 2022 (United States)
- Running time: 115 minutes
- Countries: United States; Germany; Switzerland
- Language: English
- Box office: $222,607

Paradise Highway is a 2022 thriller film written and directed by Anna Gutto in her feature length debut and starring Juliette Binoche, Frank Grillo, and Morgan Freeman. An international co-production between the United States, Germany, and Switzerland, the film was released in the United States on July 29, 2022, by Lionsgate.

== Plot ==
To save the life of her brother, truck driver Sally reluctantly agrees to smuggle illicit cargo, a girl named Leila. As they begin a danger-fraught journey across state lines, a dogged FBI operative sets out on their trail, determined to do whatever it takes to terminate a human-trafficking operation and bring Sally and Leila to safety.

== Cast ==
- Juliette Binoche as Sally
- Frank Grillo as Dennis
- Hala Finley as Leila
- Cameron Monaghan as FBI Special Agent Finley Sterling
- Veronica Ferres as Rose
- Christiane Seidel as Claire
- Morgan Freeman as Gerick

== Production ==
The film is an international co-production between the United States, Germany, and Switzerland, produced by Grindstone Entertainment Group and Silver Reel; they confirmed the lead cast of Juliette Binoche, Frank Grillo and Morgan Freeman in July 2021.

Filming occurred in Jackson and Clarksdale, Mississippi, in July 2021. Filming also took place in Brookhaven, Mississippi.

As of August 2021, the film was in post-production. In October 2021, it was announced that Lionsgate acquired North American distribution rights to the film.

== Release ==
The film was released in theaters and on-demand in the United States by Lionsgate on July 29, 2022. The film was also shown at the Locarno Festival in August 2022.

== Reception ==
=== Critical response ===
On the review aggregator website Rotten Tomatoes, 14% of 21 critics' reviews are positive, with an average rating of 5.1/10. The website's consensus reads: "No need to fasten your seatbelts; alleged thriller Paradise Highway leads a talented ensemble through a predictable, seat-numbing ride." Metacritic, which uses a weighted average, assigned the film a score of 48 out of 100, based on 5 critics, indicating "mixed or average" reviews.

Joe Leydon of Variety called the film "A shrewdly constructed melodrama that does not transcend cliches and conventions so much as show how useful and effective they can be in the right hands". Robert Daniels of RogerEbert.com wrote: "Paradise Highway is the kind wayward, tonally muddled project an actress the caliber of Binoche would only sign onto if promises were broken and payback was required". The New York Times's Concepción de León had this to say about Paradise Highway: "Though it is refreshing to see members of law enforcement focused on recovering and supporting a victim rather than pursuing her abusers, it does not allow for much narrative tension".

=== Box office ===
Paradise Highway was released direct-to-video and streaming services in North America, but did earn $222,607 at the box office in other territories.
