= Electric Citizen =

American rock band

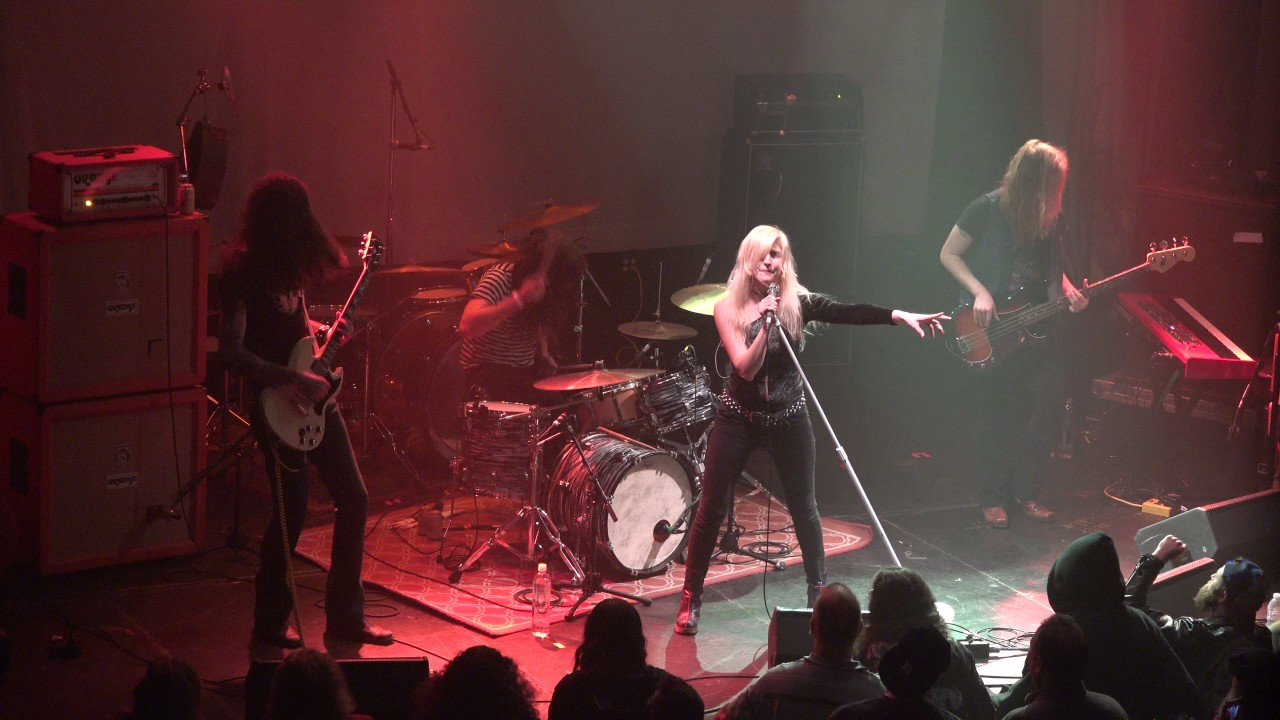
- Electric Citizen performing live. Left to right: Ross Dolan, Nate Wagner, Laura Dolan, Nick Vogelpohl.

Background information
- Also known as: SISS
- Origin: Cincinnati, Ohio, U.S.
- Genres: Stoner rock; psychedelic rock; doom metal
- Years active: 2012–present
- Labels: RidingEasy; Heavy Psych Sounds
- Members: Laura Dolan; Ross Dolan; Nick Vogelpohl; Nate Wagner
- Past members: Yusef Quotah; Randy Proctor
- Website: electriccitizenband.com

Electric Citizen are an American rock band from Cincinnati, Ohio, formed in 2012. The group's lineup consists of Laura Dolan (vocals), Ross Dolan (guitar), Nick Vogelpohl (bass, keyboards), and Nate Wagner (drums).

== History ==
=== Formation and Sateen (2012–2015) ===
Ross Dolan and Laura Busse first met in high school and later married after Ross had returned from serving in the United States Air Force during the Iraq War. They first performed together in a band called Leopard Messiah before joining forces in 2012 with bassist Nick Vogelpohl and drummer Nate Wagner of the indie rock band the Lions Rampant. The name of the band comes from the Edgar Broughton Band song, "Death of an Electric Citizen". Yusef Quotah initially joined the group on keyboards, though lost interest within a few months of his involvement due to a lack of interest in touring. On September 21, 2013, the group performed at Doomslang Festival in Lexington, Kentucky.

The group would eventually be signed to RidingEasy Records, releasing their debut album, Sateen, on June 1, 2014. To promote the album, a music video for the track "Light Years Beyond" was produced and released on RidingEasy's YouTube channel. The group toured following the album's release, performing alongside such acts as Wolfmother, The Budos Band and Fu Manchu. In the spring of 2015 the group toured California as a lead-up to their performance at Psycho California in Santa Ana on May 25, 2015. Shortly afterward, Vogelpohl temporarily left the group, and Randy Proctor was brought in as the new bassist. The group then embarked on two national tours with Pentagram.

=== Higher Time and Helltown (2016–2019) ===
The group's second album, Higher Time, was released on May 13, 2016. The album was recorded at Mt. Saturn Studios in Cincinnati and was produced by former member of The Greenhornes Brian Olive. Throughout 2016, Electric Citizen would embark on two tours of Europe, their first performances overseas. The group first appeared with Wolfmother, before touring with Horisont in the fall of 2016, a tour which culminated in their performance at Desertfest Belgium in Antwerp. The group then toured in February 2017 with The Crazy World of Arthur Brown before beginning work on their next record. During this period, Vogelpohl returned to the group on bass for another national tour.

The group's third album, Helltown, was released on September 28, 2018. A music video for the track "Hide it in the Night" was released to promote the album. The group subsequently toured with Monster Magnet before appearing at Psycho Smokeout Los Angeles on April 20, 2019. The group then made a headlining tour of Europe in May 2019, making appearances at Desertfest in Berlin and London. On August 16, 2019, the group appeared at Psycho Las Vegas.

=== Career hiatus and EC4 (2020–present) ===
The group went on hiatus in late 2019 after Laura Dolan developed a melanoma and remained inactive for three years. In 2022 it was announced that the band would be embarking on a comeback tour of Europe as a supporting act for Fu Manchu, including a performance at the Up In Smoke festival in Basel. In 2023, they began recording their fourth studio album; at the same time they performed a number of shows in Cincinnati under the alias "SISS", releasing a two-track demo under the moniker on August 27, 2024.

The group released their fourth studio album, EC4, on June 27, 2025 on the Italian label Heavy Psych Sounds. The album saw the group embarking in a new musical direction, containing influences from progressive rock and folk rock. The album's release was followed by a headlining comeback tour with the band Magick Potion. On September 9, 2025, a music video for the track "Static Vision" was released by Heavy Psych Sounds.

== Musical style ==
The group's style has been described as "sinister rock" consisting of "riff-heavy tunes with deadpan attitude". The group's music is primarily considered stoner rock, but also contains influences from heavy metal subgenres such as doom metal, sludge metal, and traditional heavy metal. The group's music has been compared to bands such as Led Zeppelin, Black Sabbath, Deep Purple, Pink Floyd, Moby Grape, Blue Cheer, Pearls Before Swine, and Kyuss.

== Members ==
=== Current ===
- Laura Dolan – vocals
- Ross Dolan – guitar
- Nick Vogelpohl – bass (2012–2015, 2017–present), keyboards (2013–2015, 2017–present)
- Nate Wagner – drums

=== Past ===
- Randy Proctor – bass (2015–2017)
- Yusef Quotah – keyboards

Timeline

== Discography ==
=== Studio albums ===
- Sateen (2014, RidingEasy)
- Higher Time (2016, RidingEasy)
- Helltown (2018, RidingEasy)
- EC4 (2025, Heavy Psych Sounds)

=== EPs ===
- Electric Citizen (The Crossing, 2013)

=== Demos ===
- SISS (2024)

== Other sources ==
- "REVIEW & TRACK PREMIERE: Electric Citizen, Helltown". The Obelisk. July 17, 2018.
