= RidingEasy =

American record label

- Founded: 2013
- Founder: Daniel Hall
- Genre: Rock, heavy metal, stoner metal, doom metal, acid rock, psychedelic rock
- Country of origin: United States
- Location: San Pedro, California
- Official website: www.ridingeasyrecs.com

RidingEasy is an American record label founded in 2013. The label specializes primarily in heavy metal and rock subgenres, including doom metal, stoner rock, sludge metal, heavy psych, and neo-psychedelia. The label is best known for its Brown Acid series of compilation albums.

== Background ==
The label was first founded in Los Angeles in 2013 by disc jockey and vinyl collector Daniel Hall. Initially known as Easy Rider Records, the label's first release was the debut album for the Swedish doom metal band, Salem's Pot. In May 2014 the label faced a lawsuit from the motorcycle magazine Easyriders, leading Hall to change the label's name to RidingEasy.

Since its founding, RidingEasy has signed a number of heavy rock and metal acts, including Acid King, Electric Citizen, Zig Zags, Sorcery, Shooting Guns, and Magick Potion. The label has also gained notoriety for Brown Acid, a series of compilation albums consisting of tracks from lesser-known rock and early heavy metal bands of the 1960s and 1970s.
