= Pop. 1280 (band) =

- Origin: New York City, United States
- Genres: Cyberpunk, noise rock, industrial rock, punk rock
- Years active: 2008–present
- Label: Sacred Bones
- Members: Chris Bug; Ivan Lip; Matthew Hord
- Past members: John Skultrane; Andrew Smith; Zach Ziemann; Pascal Ludet; Allegra Sauvage; Andy Chugg
- Website: www.pop1280.tumblr.com

Pop. 1280 is a self-styled cyberpunk/industrial rock band from Brooklyn, New York City. Their name is derived from Jim Thompson’s novel of the same name.

== History ==
The band started in 2008 when Chris Bug moved to New York after a two-year post-high-school graduation sojourn in China, convinced by his long-time friend Ivan Lip. Settled in Greenpoint the duo, with Bug at vocals and Lip at guitar, decided to recruit members who didn’t already play an instrument. So John Skultrane and Andrew Smith eventually joined as bass player and drummer. Lip started writing music along with Bug and the resulting sound was initially pegged as downer punk but soon Pop.1280 has been compared to various bands from different musical decades. In effect they seem to mix together sonic deviations from no wave and new wave, punk and industrial, noise and tribal, electronic and post hardcore, borrowing sounds from The Velvet Underground, Suicide, Joy Division, The Birthday Party, Sonic Youth, Liars and many more.

== Discography ==
=== Albums ===
- The Horror (2012, Sacred Bones Records)
- Imps of Perversion (2013, Sacred Bones Records)
- Paradise (2016, Sacred Bones Records)
- Way Station (2019, Weyrd Son Records)
- Museum On The Horizon (2021, Profound Lore Records)

=== EP ===
- The Grid (2010) (Sacred Bones Records)
- "Pulse" (2016) (Population Control Center)

=== Singles ===
- "Bedbugs"/"Times Square" (2009, self-release)
- "Neon Lights"/"Da'Rat Hessla"/"Ponys" (2010, Badmaster Records) split with Hot Guts
- "Thirteen Steps"/"Dead Hand" (2011, Blind Prophet Records)
- "Penetrate"/"Krankenschwester" (2015, Sacred Bones Records)
