= Kentucky Women Writers Conference =

American writers' conference

The Kentucky Women Writers Conference had its beginnings in 1979 as a celebration of women writers at the University of Kentucky (UK). That first year featured Maya Angelou, Toni Cade Bambara, Ruth Stone, Alice Walker, and Ruth Whitman. Since then, it has become the longest-running annual festival of women writers in the US.

UK History faculty Nancy Dye had suggested using surplus funds from Undergraduate Studies to bring women writers to campus. A 16-member committee from the departments of English, Honors, Undergraduate Studies, and Special Collections, along with members of the Lexington community, produced the conference. In 1984–1985 the conference was directed by UK English faculty Jane Gentry Vance, who later served as Kentucky's Poet Laureate.

In 1985–1993, the conference was affiliated with Continuing Education for Women/University Extension and directed by Betty Gabehart. In 1994–1996, the conference was affiliated with the Women's Studies Program and directed by Jan Oaks, faculty in English and Gender and Women's Studies. In 1997, former Conference assistant Patti DeYoung served as director.

In 1998, the conference lost university funding when it was unable to find a sponsoring department, and its advisory board established itself as a 501(c)(3) nonprofit organization. Its new home became the Carnegie Center for Literacy and Learning in downtown Lexington, and it was renamed the Kentucky Women Writers Conference. Its director during those years, 1998–2002, was Jan Isenhour, also director of the Carnegie Center, and its work was carried out by a volunteer board.

In 2002, President Lee Todd reinstated support for the conference to demonstrate the university's commitment to women's programming and community events. Since then, the Conference leadership has continued cultivating wide community support through many partnerships and the committed efforts of its board and volunteers. UK provides staff salaries, office space, and the majority of KWWC's operating expenses. Financial support from the Kentucky Foundation for Women, LexArts, the Kentucky Arts Council, the Kentucky Humanities Council, businesses, and individual patrons remains critical to our ability to attract writers of the highest caliber.

Directors since then have been Brenda Weber (2003) and Rebecca Gayle Howell (2004–2006). Howell launched several free community events that have become signature offerings of the conference, including the Gypsy Slam, the Sonia Sanchez Series, and the Hardwick/Jones keynote reading on mentorship and collaboration. In 2007, Julie Kuzneski Wrinn became Conference director. The 38th annual conference was held September 15–16, 2017 in Lexington, Kentucky.
