= Anna Gutto =

Norwegian-American director, writer, and actress

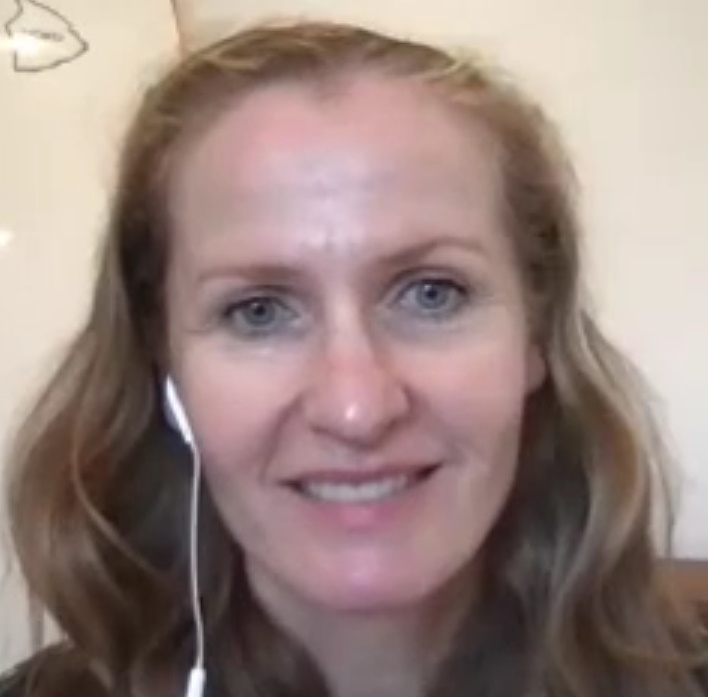
- Gutto in 2022
- Born: Anna Guttormsgaard
- Citizenship: Norway and US
- Education: Columbia University
- Occupations: Film director, writer, translator, actor
- Known for: Paradise Highway (2022)

Anna Gutto, or Anna Guttormsgaard, is a Norwegian-born American film director, writer, and actor. She wrote and directed her debut feature-length film Paradise Highway (2022), featuring Juliette Binoche and Morgan Freeman. Prior to that, she had directed episodes of the Norwegian Netflix series Home for Christmas (Hjem til jul), as well as five short films. Described as a "multi-hyphenate creative", her career has included playwriting, as well as translation and adaptation of Norwegian texts into English.

== Early life and education ==
Guttormsgaard attended secondary school in Oslo, Norway, and had experience as an exchange student in Indiana. She later moved to New York and completed a master of fine arts degree in film directing at Columbia University, with honors, in 2016. She refined the script for Paradise Highway while attending graduate school at Columbia.

== Theatre career ==
=== Oslo Elsewhere ===
In 2004, Guttormsgaard and Sarah Cameron Sunde co-founded Oslo Elsewhere, a theatre company known for translating and producing Norwegian playwright Jon Fosse's works in the United States. Guttormsgaard also performed in several plays by Fosse, including the U.S. premiere of SA KA LA (2008) and Night Sings Its Songs (2004), both at 45 Bleecker Street Theater in New York City. A review in The New York Times said the cast in Night Sings Its Songs was "uniformly excellent", noting that "Guttormsgaard's [character] smiles when she says awful things" to her husband, played by Louis Cancelmi.

Guttormsgaard translated and adapted Rosmersholm by Henrik Ibsen with Bridgette Wimberly and Oda Radoor, transposing the setting from Norway to America. In 2006, she played the main character Rebecca West, the live-in girlfriend of minister John Rosmer (Charles Parnell), for a double-bill staging together with Fosse's deathvariations at the 59E59 Theaters. The New York Times said Rosmersholm was the less successful of the two plays, with Guttormsgaard giving a "quietly realistic performance" but one which failed to convey the "passion and beauty" of the main character. The Chronicle of Higher Education called out Guttormsgaard's portrayal of West as "excellent". Another review by nytheatre.com said Guttormsgaard and her co-writers had done a "masterful job of translating the play and adapting it to a more modern setting and sensibility", while acknowledging the challenges inherent in the original work by Ibsen. Meanwhile, Ibsen News and Comment said, "By far the best of the lot was Anna Guttormsgaard as Rebecca, who overacted a bit but managed her second-act confrontations with Kroll and Rosmer with such power and conviction that one almost forgave her for her work as the translator and adaptor."

=== The Unbound Collective ===
In addition to her work with Oslo Elsewhere, Guttormsgaard was co-artistic director of The Unbound Collective. Previously known as The Unbound Theater, the company presented works including Under Milk Wood by Dylan Thomas in 2003, and The Workroom by Jean-Paul Grumberg. In The Workroom, Guttormsgaard played Simone, a Jewish seamstress in post-war Paris whose husband has been deported.

By 2009, she was known as Anna Gutto, and wrote and starred in In Security, the company's fifth production. Playing Lona Waverton, a doctor struggling with the demands of work, family and friends, she was the only live character on stage, while other characters appeared as projections on her office wall during phone conversations and while playing voicemail messages.

== Film and television career ==
=== Acting ===
Gutto appeared in the independent film The Contenders (2010), playing the "obnoxious hostess" of a weekend gathering of five friends, one of whom dies off-screen. She appeared in the film Gone with the Woman (Tatt av kvinnen) (2007), directed by Petter Næss.

=== Directing ===
Prior to her feature-length film debut, Gutto directed five short films. Her short film The Light Above is about a young sex-trafficking victim who manages to escape. She received a grant from the Alfred P. Sloan Foundation to work on A Lucky Man, which tells the story of a college football player who is raped. Her other short films included Mommy Heist, which was broadcast on France Television's FR3.

Gutto assisted the director on the Norwegian Netflix series Home for Christmas (Hjem til jul) during its first season with creator Per-Olav Sørensen. The miniseries, which first aired in 2019, is often compared to the Christmas romantic comedy film Love Actually.

==== Paradise Highway (2022) ====
Gutto first got the idea for Paradise Highway around 2011. The film is about an American truck driver who is forced into human trafficking. While developing the script, she met with and researched the lives of female truckers in the United States.

One of Gutto's early supporters was Norwegian cinematographer John Christian Rosenlund, who sent actress Juliette Binoche the script when she happened to be traveling on a road trip in the U.S. Lionsgate agreed to worldwide distribution after the team landed Binoche in the starring role. Producer Claudia Bluemenhuber secured actor Morgan Freeman to play the FBI agent who is in pursuit, intent on ending the human-trafficking operation. The film shoot took place in Mississippi in the summer of 2021.

Paradise Highway received mixed reviews. In a review for Variety, critic Joe Leydon praised the film as a "solid and satisfying thriller" and "a singularly promising debut for a first-time feature filmmaker", writing, "Gutto demonstrates welcome restraint and a meticulous avoidance of anything that resembles exploitation, relying on indirect yet impactful allusions to keep us constantly aware of the mortal stakes involved." Meanwhile, The New York Times described it as a film that "does not quite hit its stride". In a review for RogerEbert.com, critic Robert Daniels argued that Gutto clearly wanted "the movie to serve as an indictment of a system" but that it "falters" despite the writer/director's best intentions.

== Other grants and awards ==
Gutto won the Zaki Gordon Memorial Award for Excellence in Screenwriting for her feature screenplay Paradise Highway (aka Leila M.).

She received the two-year Artist Working Grant from the Norwegian state (Arbeidsstipend for yngre kunstnere fra Statens kunstnerstipend). She received the 2007 Cultural Award from American Scandinavian Society.
