= These United States =

US musical group

- Jesse Elliott performing at the Local 506 in Chapel Hill, North Carolina.

Background information
- Origin: Washington, D.C., U.S.
- Genres: Rock and roll, indie folk, psychedelic folk, pop, garage rock, alternative country, psychedelic rock
- Years active: 2006–2012
- Label: United Interests
- Members: Justin Craig; Jesse Elliott; J. Tom Hnatow; Aaron Latos; Anna Morsett
- Past members: Robby Cosenza; Mark Charles Heidinger; Colin Kellogg; David Strackany; Dave Wynn; Josh Read; Winston Yu
- Website: Official website

These United States was an American rock band from Brooklyn, New York, and Carrboro, North Carolina, made up of songwriter and bandleader Jesse Elliott, pedal steel and keyboardist J. Tom Hnatow, guitarist Justin Craig, bassist and vocalist Anna Morsett, and drummer and percussionist Aaron Latos. The band released five albums since 2008 via the Colorado-based record label United Interests. In the five years since their formation, TUS has played 800 shows across the United States, United Kingdom, and northern Europe, appearing at South by Southwest, CMJ Music Marathon, and Lollapalooza in the U.S., and the UK's Glastonbury Festival.

== History ==
TUS' debut album, A Picture of the Three of Us at the Gate to the Garden of Eden, was recorded by Elliott and producer David Strackany (known as Paleo) in Elgin, IL, Iowa City, IA, and Washington, D.C. The album features musical cameos by a large supporting cast—notably, Saadat Awan, Dan D'Avella, Dave Hahn, and early TUS collaborator Mark Charles, now of Vandaveer. Picture was mixed and mastered by Chad Clark of Beauty Pill and T.J. Lipple of Aloha at Inner Ear Studios in Arlington, VA, and released on March 4, 2008. Track 'First Sight' had its UK debut on BBC Radio 6 on July 14, 2008, and the album as a whole enjoyed favorable reviews from The Austin Chronicle, Alternative Press, The Village Voice, and others.

Crimes, the group's second album, was recorded in Lexington, KY at Shangri-La Studios, six weeks after the release of Picture. It was produced and mixed by Duane Lundy, with co-production by Rob Gordon and These United States (by then composed of Elliott and full-time band members Charles, Cosenza, Craig), and released on September 23, 2008. Paste Magazine, Pitchfork Media, National Public Radio, and others praised the album despite (and in many cases because of) its sonic departure from the group's debut. These United States recorded live sessions and interviews for All Things Considered, Daytrotter, and WOXY.com, as Crimes reached No. 30 on the College Music Journal Top 200 radio chart in late 2008.

In February 2009, TUS recorded its third album, Everything Touches Everything, at Inner Ear Studios, with T.J. Lipple this time taking on the role of producer. Released September 1 of that year, the album proved TUS' most energetic and upbeat to date. SPIN Magazine sang its praises ('captures the overwhelming jolt of simply being alive...swings between a sleazy leer and a dreamy purr...deftly blurring the line between carnal and cosmic'), as Jon Pareles of The New York Times weighed in on the band's live show ('superb...equally at home with quiet, morose tales and galloping punky-tonk adventures...a rambunctious alt-country band with story-songs that are both tangled and aphoristic'). Influential DJ and music writer Bruce Warren, of public radio station WXPN, called These United States 'one of indie-rock's -- no, make that American rock's -- best kept secrets.'

For its fourth album, TUS worked at Sound Mine Recording in rural eastern Pennsylvania. The resulting 10 tracks, produced by Dan Wise and TUS' Justin Craig, and featuring vocals by Dawn Landes, were released on July 20, 2010, as What Lasts. The accompanying album tour included supporting dates with Fruit Bats, Deer Tick, Langhorne Slim, and Bonnie Prince Billy, and continuing acclaim from The New York Times, Pop Matters, and The Washington Post. Among its 180 live performances of the year were stops at Seattle's KEXP; Daytrotter's Barn On the 4th with The Walkmen, Dawes, and Justin Townes Earle; La Blogotheque's Take-Away Show; and NPR's World Cafe and Mountain Stage.

2011 saw These United States scale back its frenetic touring pace to just 100 shows and festivals, as the band spent more time writing and recording in studios in Kentucky, New York, North Carolina, Illinois, Pennsylvania, and Ontario. In 2012, the group released its fifth album — the eponymously titled These United States — featuring contributions from Deer Tick, Phosphorescent, Langhorne Slim, Frontier Ruckus, The Mynabirds, Cotton Jones, Revival, Ben Sollee, Backwords, and Jukebox the Ghost, and co-produced at Shangri-La Studios by Duane Lundy, Justin Craig, and Jesse Elliott.

On October 11, 2012, frontman Jesse Elliott announced These United States' indefinite hiatus on the band's website. In his post, the band released a final, home-recorded track titled "I'll Bring You a Song."

== Discography ==
A Picture Of The Three Of Us At The Gate To The Garden Of Eden (March 4, 2008)

Track Listing

1. Preface: Painless
2. First Sight
3. Kings & Aces
4. The Business
5. Jenni Anne
6. Diving Boards Pointed At the Sky
7. Burn This Bridge
8. Sun Is Below & Above
9. Remember Dear
10. Slow Crows Over
11. So High So Low So Wide So Long
12. Only the Lonely Devil Knows

Crimes (September 23, 2008)

Track Listing

1. West Won
2. Susie at the Seashore
3. Get Yourself Home (In Search of the Mistress Whose Kisses are Famous)
4. Pleasure and Pain and Pride and Me
5. We Go Down to That Corner
6. Honor Amongst Thieves
7. Six Fast Bullets (Five Complaints)
8. Heaven Can Wait
9. Study the Moon
10. Those Low Country Girls
11. Old John Chapman Takes a Good Long Walk
12. When You're Traveling at the Speed of Light

Everything Touches Everything (September 1, 2009)

Track Listing

1. I Want You To Keep Everything
2. Will It Ever
3. Everything Touches Everything
4. Night & the Revolution
5. The Secret Door
6. Conquest & Consequence
7. I'm Gonna Assemble a City
8. Good Bones
9. The Important Thing
10. End
11. Good Night Wish

What Lasts (July 20, 2010)

Track Listing

1. Nobody Can Tell
2. Dug Him in the Dirt
3. One You Believe
4. The Great Rivers
5. Just This
6. Life&Death She&I
7. Ever Make You Mine
8. What Do You Want With My Heart?
9. What Lasts
10. Water & Wheat

These United States (June 12, 2012)

Track Listing

1. Dead & Gone
2. Born Young
3. Let the River In
4. Miss Underground
5. Maps
6. Two Gods
7. Not Gone Tonight
8. So Sweet to Be Back
9. The Angel's Share
10. The Park
11. Vince
12. Never Stop Falling
