= Kaye Ballard =

American actress and singer (1925–2019)

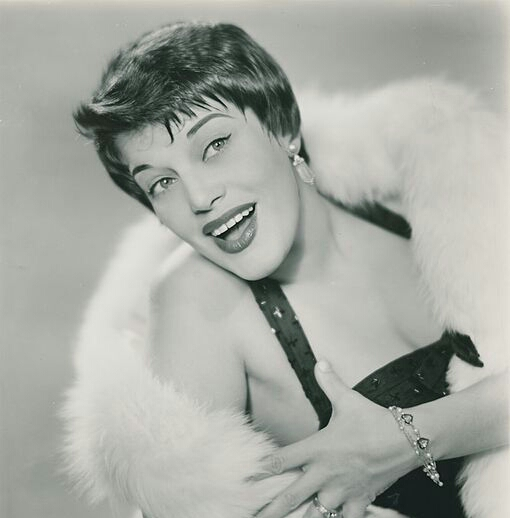
- Ballard's late 1950s publicity photo
- Born: Catherine Gloria Balotta; November 20, 1925; Cleveland, Ohio, U.S.
- Died: January 21, 2019 (aged 93); Rancho Mirage, California, U.S.
- Occupations: Actress; comedian; singer
- Years active: 1940s–2017

Kaye Ballard (November 20, 1925 – January 21, 2019) was an American actress, comedian, and singer.

== Early life ==
Ballard was born Catherine Gloria Balotta in Cleveland, Ohio, one of four children born to Italian immigrant parents, Lena (née Nacarato) and Vincenzo (later Vincent James) Balotta. Her parents immigrated to the United States from Calabria, a region of southern Italy.

== Career ==
Ballard established herself as a musical comedian in the 1940s, joining the Spike Jones touring revue of entertainers. Capable of playing broad physical comedy as well as stand-up dialogue routines, she became familiar in television and stage productions. Ballard made her television debut on Henry Morgan's Great Talent Hunt, a short-lived program hosted by Henry Morgan which first aired January 26, 1951. In 1954, she was the first person to record the song "Fly Me to the Moon."

In 1957, she and Alice Ghostley played the two wicked stepsisters in the live telecast of Rodgers and Hammerstein's Cinderella, starring Julie Andrews in the title role. During the 1961–1963 television seasons, Ballard was a regular on The Perry Como Show, as part of the Kraft Music Hall Players, along with Don Adams, Paul Lynde, and Sandy Stewart. In 1962, she released the LP Peanuts, on which she played Lucy van Pelt from the comic strip namesake of the album (with Arthur Siegel playing Charlie Brown), and dramatizing a series of vignettes drawn from the strip's archive. In 1964, she had a guest role on The Patty Duke Show (Season 1, Episode 25), playing a teacher for would-be models. From 1967 to 1969, she co-starred as Kaye Buell, a woman whose son marries her next door neighbor's daughter, in the sitcom The Mothers-in-Law, with Eve Arden playing her neighbor. From 1970 to 1972, she appeared as a regular on The Doris Day Show, playing restaurant owner Angie Pallucci. She made appearances on the game show Match Game. In 1977, she was a guest star on The Muppet Show. She also appeared on the television series Alice, in which she played a kleptomaniac and phony medium as well as Daddy Dearest, where she guest-starred opposite Richard Lewis and Don Rickles.

Ballard starred on Broadway as Helen in The Golden Apple (1954) introducing the song "Lazy Afternoon". She portrayed Ruth in Joseph Papp's The Pirates of Penzance, Rosalie in Carnival! and the title role in Molly, an unsuccessful musical adaptation of the popular radio serial The Goldbergs. She created the role of the Countess and closed out-of-town in Marc Blitzstein's Reuben, Reuben, and played Ruth Sherwood in Wonderful Town at New York City Center in 1963.

In Long Beach, California, she played Mama Morton in Chicago and fought with a vacuum cleaner as Pauline in No, No, Nanette. In 1998, she played Hattie Walker in the Paper Mill Playhouse's acclaimed revival of Stephen Sondheim's Follies. In 2005, she appeared in a road-company production of Nunsense, written by Dan Goggin. The following year, she completed her autobiography How I Lost 10 Pounds in 53 Years.

In 1995, she was awarded a Golden Palm Star on the Palm Springs Walk of Stars.

She appeared in The Super Mario Bros. Super Show! as Madam A-Go-Go, a mysterious fortune teller who appears in the episode "Fortune Teller". She also performed with The Fabulous Palm Springs Follies at the Plaza Theatre in Palm Springs, California.

In December 2010, she, Donna McKechnie and Liliane Montevecchi starred in a production of From Broadway with Love, staged at the Lensic Theater in Santa Fe, New Mexico. Ballard was in the 2012 cabaret show Doin' It for Love, which premiered in Austin, Texas at the Paramount Theatre. Starring Ballard and Montevecchi, the cast included Broadway dancer Lee Roy Reams. (The Austin performance benefited the Texas Humane Legislation Network.) The show then went on to play in Los Angeles on March 8 and 10, 2012. Ballard announced her official retirement in 2015 at the age of 89.

== Death ==
Ballard died at her home in Rancho Mirage, California, on January 21, 2019, at the age of 93. The cause was kidney cancer, according to a friend.

== Filmography ==
=== Film ===
Year	Title	Role	Notes
1958	The Girl Most Likely	Marge	
1964	A House Is Not a Home	Sidonia	
1970	Which Way to the Front?	Senora Messina	
1976	The Ritz	Vivian Proclo	
1976	Freaky Friday	Coach Betsy	
1980	Falling in Love Again	Mrs. Lewis	
1981	Irene	Dotty Busmill	TV movie
1982	Pandemonium	Glenn's Mom	
1988	Tiger Warsaw	Aunt Thelma	
1990	Modern Love	Receptionist	
1990	Eternity	Sabrina / Selma	
1990	Fate	Judy	
1994	Ava's Magical Adventure	Leona	
1998	The Modern Adventures of Tom Sawyer	Mrs. Grumpy Old Man	
1999	Baby Geniuses	Mayor	
2000	The Million Dollar Kid	Mrs. Crabby	
2000	Little Insects	Queen Palooma (voice)	
2003	Broadway: The Golden Age, by the Legends Who Were There	Herself	Documentary
2017	Senior Moment	Maria	
2019	Kaye Ballard – The Show Goes On	Herself	

=== Television ===
Year	Title	Role	Notes
1951–1955	The Arthur Murray Party	Herself	2 episodes
1954	The Steve Allen Show	Herself	1 episode
1954–1955	The Colgate Comedy Hour	Herself	7 episodes
1956–1963	The Ed Sullivan Show	Herself	4 episodes
1957	Cinderella	Portia	TV special
1957–1962	Tonight Starring Jack Paar	Herself	27 episodes
1958	Make Me Laugh	Herself	3 episodes
1958–1960	The Garry Moore Show	Herself	3 episodes
1960–1963	The Perry Como Show	Herself	52 episodes
1962	Play Your Hunch	Herself	2 episodes
1962	The Tonight Show	Herself	2 episodes
1963	Candid Camera	Herself	2 episodes
1963–1975	The Tonight Show Starring Johnny Carson	Herself	55 episodes
1963–1978	The Merv Griffin Show	Herself	10 episodes
1963–1979	The Mike Douglas Show	Herself	34 episodes
1964	The Patty Duke Show	Mrs. Selby	"The Perfect Teenager"
1967–1968	The Hollywood Palace	Herself	2 episodes
1967–1969	The Mothers-in-Law	Kaye Buell	Main role: 56 episodes
1967–1975	Hollywood Squares	Herself	168 episodes
1968	Rowan & Martin's Laugh-In	Guest	"1.5"
1968–1969	Kraft Music Hall	Herself	2 episodes
1968–1969	The Jerry Lewis Show	Herself	4 episodes
1969	The Red Skelton Show	DMV Clerk	"Willie Lump Lump's Birthday"
1969	Storybook Squares	Herself	1 episode
1969	Della	Herself	2 episodes
1969	The Leslie Uggams Show	Herself	2 episodes
1969–1970	Kraft Music Hall	Herself	3 episodes
1970	All My Children	Mrs. Remo	TV series
1970	Love, American Style	Sally	"Love and the V.I.P. Restaurant"
1970	The Bob Hope Specials	Herself	1 episode
1970–1971	It's Your Bet	Herself	2 episodes
1970–1972	The Doris Day Show	Angie Pallucci	Recurring role: 10 episodes
1971	The Dick Cavett Show	Herself	1 episode
1971	Here's Lucy	Donna	"Lucy and Harry's Italian Bombshell"
1971	Love, American Style	Helen	"Love and the Dream Burglar"
1972	The David Frost Show	Herself	1 episode
1972–1973	The Carol Burnett Show	Herself	2 episodes
1973–1974	Match Game	Herself	10 episodes
1973	Pyramid	Herself	5 episodes
1974	Celebrity Sweepstakes	Herself	1 episode
1974	Celebrity Bowling	Herself	1 episode
1974	The Bob Braun Show	Herself	1 episode
1974–1976	Dinah!	Herself	1 episode
1975	The Montefuscos	Filomena	"Filomena's Visit"
1976	Police Story	Nurse Ladue	"Officer Dooly"
1977	Alice	Seama	"The Hex"
1977	The Muppet Show	Guest	1 episode
1978–1981	The Love Boat	Cora Bass / Joan Redmond / Babe	3 episodes
1979	Fantasy Island	Elvira Wilson	'Hit Man/The Swimmer"
1980	The Dream Merchants	Esther Kessler	TV miniseries
1980	Broadway on Showtime	Salome	"The Robber Bridegroom"
1980	The Steve Allen Comedy Hour	Herself	3 episodes
1980–1981	Trapper John, M.D.	Beulah Krakowsky / Mother	2 episodes
1981	Irene	Dotty Busmill	TV film
1981	Here's Boomer	Sophia	"Make 'Em Laugh"
1983	Great Performances	Duchess	"Alice in Wonderland"
1984	Young People's Specials	Mrs. Deluca	"That Funny Fat Kid"
1985	Doris Day's Best Friends	Herself	1 episode
1986	The Lee Phillip Show	Herself	1 episode
1987	The Law & Harry McGraw	Angela Calucci	"Angela's Secret"
1989	The Super Mario Bros. Super Show!	Madame Agogo	1 episode
1989	Monsters	Faye Ingram	"Rerun"
1989–1991	The Munsters Today	Mother Nature / Mother Earth	"A-Camping We Will Go", one other episode
1990–1991	What a Dummy	Mrs. Treva Travalony	Main role: 24 episodes
1991	Doris Day: A Sentimental Journey	Herself	TV documentary
1993	Daddy Dearest	Mrs. Lento	"Al vs. DMV"
1994–1995	Due South	Mrs. Vecchio	3 episodes
1996–1999	The Rosie O'Donnell Show	Herself	3 episodes
1998–2001	Biography	Herself	2 episodes
1999–2001	Mysteries and Scandals	Herself	4 episodes
2002	The Hollywood Greats	Herself	Season 8, Episode 8: "Doris Day"

== Stage work ==
- Three to Make Ready (1946)
- That's the Ticket! (Phila. 1948)
- Touch and Go (London, 1950)
- Top Banana (1952) (replacement for Rose Marie)
- The Golden Apple (1954)
- Reuben, Reuben (1955) (closed on the road)
- Wonderful Town (1958; 1963)
- Carnival! (1961)
- Gypsy (Dallas, 1962)
- The Beast in Me (1963)
- Royal Flush (1964) (closed on the road)
- The Decline and Fall of the Entire World as Seen Through the Eyes of Cole Porter (1965, Off-Broadway)
- Minnie's Boys (1972)
- Molly (1973)
- Gypsy (1973)
- Sheba (1974) (closed on the road)
- Apartment 8 Strikes Back (1980)
- The Pirates of Penzance (1981) (replacement for Estelle Parsons)
- Pippin (1982)
- Hey, Ma ... Kaye Ballard (1984)
- High Spirits (1984)
- She stoops to conquer (1984, Off-Broadway)
- The Ladies Who Wrote the Lyrics (1985)
- Kaye Ballard: Working 42nd St. at Last! (1988, Off-Broadway)
- Nymph Errant (1989)
- Funny Girl (1991; 1997; 2002)
- Hey, Ma - Working Hollywood Blvd. at Last! (1991)
- Chicago (1992, Long Beach)
- No, No, Nanette (1994, Long Beach; 1997, Paper Mill Playhouse)
- Over the River and Through the Woods (1998, Off-Broadway)
- Follies (1998, Paper Mill Playhouse)
- The Full Monty (2001)
- Funny Girl (2002, New York in concert)
- Quartet (2002, 2006)
- Nunsense (2003)

== Discography ==
Year	Albums / Singles	Material	Co-singers
1950	Love Like Ours / Thinking of You	Single	
1952	Oklahoma	Studio Cast of the Musical	Nelson Eddy
1952	Roberta	Studio Cast of the Musical	Nelson Eddy
1953	Gershwin Rarities Volume 1	Compilation	
1954	The Golden Apple	Original Broadway Cast	Anna Maria Alberghetti
1954	In other Words / Lazy Afternoon	Single	
1954	Triumph of Love / Where Were You Last Night	Single	
1955	In Love And Out Again / Don't You Tell Pa	Single	
1955	Lyrics by Lerner	Album	
1956	The Girl most likely	Original Movie Cast	Jane Powell
1957	Cinderella	Original TV Cast Album	Julie Andrews
1957	The Parade Is Passing Me By / A Difference In Age	Single	
1959	Kaye Ballard swings!	Live Album	
1959	The Fanny Brice Story in Songs	Album	
1960	Hush Little Baby / Resta Cu'mme (Stay Here With Me)	Single	
1961	Boo Hoo Ha-Ha	Album	
1961	Carnival	Original Broadway Cast	
1961	Kaye Ballard Live?	Album	
1962	Peanuts	Album (spoken word)	Arthur Siegel
1962	Mr. President	Studio Cast of the Musical	Perry Como
1963	I'll Remember Him / Here And Now	Single	
1964	Cole Porter Revisited	Compilation	
1964	I Want You To Be The First To Know / Maybe This Time	Single	
1965	My Dog met your Dog / An Onion and You	Single	
1966	Ben Bagley's The Decline and Fall of the Entire World as Seen Through the Eyes of Cole Porter	Compilation	
1972	Unpublished Cole Porter	Compilation	
1981	So long, 174th Street	Studio Cast of the Original Musical	Robert Morse
1983	Ben Bagley's Jerome Kern Revisited Vol. II	Compilation	
1983	Ben Bagley's Jerome Kern Revisited Vol. III	Compilation	
1985	The Ladies who wrote the Lyrics	Album	
1985	Contemporary Broadway Revisited	Compilation	
1986	Mostly Mercer	Compilation	
1990	Nymph Errant	Live Recording	
1992	Hey, Ma	Live Recording of Show	
1995	Then & Again	Album	
1995	Long Time Friends	Album	Jaye P. Morgan
1998	Follies	Paper Mill Playhouse Cast	
2000	Another Final Farewell Appearance	Live Recording of Show	
2001	Kaye Ballard sings her favorite Songs	Album	
