= Dagmar Midcap =

Canadian–American television personality

- Born: Dagmar Gottschalk; Canada
- Occupations: Journalist, meteorologist
- Employer(s): WUPA-TV, CBS
- Height: 168 cm (5 ft 6 in)

Dagmar Midcap (née Gottschalk) is a Canadian-born American media personality, weathercaster, and actor originally based in Vancouver, British Columbia. She was the weekday evening weather anchor for WUPA-TV in Atlanta, Georgia from 2025 to 2026.

Midcap was the weekday evening weather anchor for KNSD-TV in San Diego, California from 2011 to August 2023.

== Career ==
=== Television ===
A graduate of British Columbia Institute of Technology's broadcast journalism program in 1990, Midcap began her television career on WBNX-TV in Akron, Ohio, appearing on a weekly current affairs program (1990–1998). She then returned to British Columbia, where she worked as the traffic and weather reporter on VTV's Breakfast before moving to Global Television Network's BCTV Morning Show as a fill-in traffic reporter.

Moving away from live television, she hosted Crash Test Mommy on the Life Network. In 2005 she became co-host of BCTV's Driving Television, a weekly survey of automotive industry news for which she test drove new cars on a regular basis. It was broadcast nationally in Canada on Global.

In 2007 she returned to the United States where she became the weather and traffic anchor for the Better Mornings morning show on CBS affiliate WGCL-TV in Atlanta, Georgia, beginning in April. As of January 2008, she became the main weather anchor for WGCL-TV, doing forecasts during the late afternoon and evening newscasts. Midcap tendered her notice to the station on September 3, 2010, citing ongoing emotional and physical distress as a result of her boyfriend's suicide. The station acknowledged her departure on September 7, 2010.

On October 25, 2011, Midcap started as the weekday evening weather anchor for KNSD-TV in San Diego, California, an NBC owned-and-operated station. Midcap took a leave of absence in August 2023, with the station ultimately announcing her departure in October 2023. Midcap stated she was "living through her third life-changing chapter", after departing from a cult she was raised in and her boyfriend committing suicide while she was working as a weather anchor in Atlanta.

In 2026, Midcap returned to Atlanta as the weekday evening weather anchor for new CBS-affiliate WUPA-TV. She last presented the weather in May 2026; her biography was removed from CBS News Atlanta's website in October. No explanation was provided by Midcap or the station.

=== Acting career ===
In Canada, Midcap often appeared in film and television series produced in the Vancouver area. She has appeared in such films as Catwoman, Baby Geniuses 2 and Air Bud: Seventh Inning Fetch. Television appearances have included Smallville, Stargate SG-1, Dead Zone, Just Cause, Medium, Touching Evil and Twilight Zone, among others. She has also had recurring roles on the series Dark Angel.
