= Steven Paul =

American filmmaker and actor

- Born: May 16, 1959 (age 67); New York, New York, U.S.
- Occupations: Film producer, talent manager, screenwriter, director, actor
- Title: Chief executive officer of Crystal Sky Pictures
- Website: crystalsky.com/about

Steven Paul (born May 16, 1959) is an American independent filmmaker, actor, and talent manager. He is the chairman, founder and CEO of Crystal Sky Pictures.

== Life and career ==
Paul was born in New York City. His mother, Dorothy Koster Paul, was a casting director, and his father was in the investment business. He began his career as a child actor at the age of 7, and began writing plays when he was 12. At the age of 21 years old, he made his directorial debut with Falling in Love Again, which he also co-wrote and produced.

Paul's producing credits include Never Too Young to Die, The Musketeer, Ghost Rider, Bratz: The Movie, Doomsday, Tekken, Ghost in the Shell, Rambo: Last Blood, and the Baby Geniuses series. He is also actor Jon Voight's manager, and previously managed Gene Wilder, Michael Cimino, and Bob Clark. He originally set up Paul Entertainment in the early 1980s, teaming up with actress Bo Derek in 1987 to sell the unreleased feature film A Knight of Love.

In 2000, MM Media and Crystal Sky had a 12-picture co-financing deal.

In January 2017, Paul purchased the distribution company Echo Bridge.

During 2024, Paul and his production company, Crystal Sky Pictures, was among the parties bidding for a controlling interest in National Amusements. Paul was assembling investors with a bid of $3 billion.

== Filmography ==
=== Film ===
==== Writer/Producer ====
Year	Title	Producer	Writer	Other	Director
1980	Falling in Love Again	Yes	Yes	No	Himself
1982	Slapstick of Another Kind	Yes	Yes	No	Himself
1986	Never Too Young to Die	Yes	Yes	No	Gil Bettman
1990	Eternity	Yes	Yes	No	Himself
1992	The Double 0 Kid	Yes	Story	No	Dee McLachlan
1995	Hourglass	Yes	Story	No	C. Thomas Howell
1997	The Protector	Yes	Story	No	Jack Gill
1999	Baby Geniuses	Yes	Story	Yes	Bob Clark
1999	A Dog of Flanders	Executive	No	Yes	Kevin Brodie
2004	The Karate Dog	Yes	Yes	No	Bob Clark
2004	Superbabies: Baby Geniuses 2	Yes	Story	Yes	Bob Clark
2009	Opposite Day	Yes	Story	Yes	R. Michael Givens
2012	Chilly Christmas	Yes	No	Yes	Gregory Poppen
2013	Baby Geniuses: Baby Squad Investigators	Yes	Yes	Yes	Sean McNamara
2013	Dracula: The Dark Prince	Yes	Yes	Yes	Pearry Teo
2014	Baby Geniuses and the Treasures of Egypt	Yes	Yes	Yes	Sean McNamara
2014	Tekken 2: Kazuya's Revenge	Yes	Yes	Yes	Wych Kaosayananda
2014	A Magic Christmas	Executive	No	Yes	R. Michael Givens
2015	A Christmas Eve Miracle	Yes	Story	Yes	R. Michael Givens
2015	Baby Geniuses and the Space Baby	Yes	Yes	Yes	Sean McNamara
2016	JL Ranch	Yes	Story	No	Charles Robert Carner
2018	Surviving the Wild	Yes	Story	Yes	Patrick Alessandrin
2018	Orphan Horse	Yes	Story	No	Sean McNamara
2018	The Ghost Beyond	Yes	Story	No	R. Michael Givens
2020	JL Family Ranch 2	Yes	Story	No	Sean McNamara
2024	Utopia (2024 film)	Yes	Yes	No	James Bamford
2025	Man with No Past	No	Yes	No	James Bamford

==== Producer only ====
Year	Title	Director
1987	Emanon	Stuart Paul
1990	Fate	Stuart Paul
1993	Bitter Harvest	Duane Clark
1994	Huck and the King of Hearts	Michael Keusch
1994	Hail Caesar	Anthony Michael Hall
1994	A Million to Juan	Paul Rodriguez
1995	Charlie's Ghost Story	Anthony Edwards
1996	Exit in Red	Yurek Bogayevicz
1997	Bombshell	Paul Wynne
1998	The Modern Adventures of Tom Sawyer	Adam Weissman
1999	The Prince and the Surfer	Arye Gross
2000	The Million Dollar Kid	Neil Mandt
2006	The Legend of Simon Conjurer	Stuart Paul
2007	Ghost Rider	Mark Steven Johnson
2007	Bratz: The Movie	Sean McNamara
2008	Doomsday	Neil Marshall
2010	Tekken	Dwight H. Little
2011	Ghost Rider: Spirit of Vengeance	Mark Neveldine; Brian Taylor
2012	Beyond	Josef Rusnak
2013	Robosapien: Rebooted	Sean McNamara
2014	The Final Song	Stuart Paul
2017	Ghost in the Shell	Rupert Sanders
2018	Reverse Heaven	Stuart Paul
2019	Dr. Jekyll Better Hide	Stuart Paul
2024	The Painter	Kimani Ray Smith

==== Executive producer ====
Year	Title	Director
1993	Deadly Exposure	Lawrence Mortorff
1994	Confessions of a Hitman	Larry Leahy
1995	The Whispering	Gregory Gieras
2000	Little Insects	Gregory Gieras
2001	The Musketeer	Peter Hyams
2002	Julie Walking Home	Agnieszka Holland
2006	Broken	Simon Boyes; Adam Mason
2006	Treasure Island Kids: The Battle of Treasure Island	Gavin Scott
2006	Treasure Island Kids: The Monster of Treasure Island	Michael Hurst
2007	The Devil's Chair	Adam Mason
2007	Big Stan	Rob Schneider
2011	Down the Shore	Harold Guskin
2011	Pizza Man	Joe Eckardt
2012	The Forger	Lawrence Roeck
2014	Wolves	David Hayter
2016	Amazing Ape	Juliano Brotman
2016	Madtown	Charles Moore
2016	Smoking Guns	Savvas Michael
2016	AmStarDam	Lee and Wayne Lennox
2016	Dwelling	Kyle Mecca
2017	Security	Alain DesRochers
2017	Pottersville	Seth Henrikson
2019	Red Devil	Savvas D. Michael
2020	Tribal Get Out Alive	Matt Routledge

==== Actor ====
Year	Title	Role	Notes
1971	Happy Birthday, Wanda June	Paul Ryan	
1980	Falling in Love Again	Stan the Con (1940's)	
1982	Slapstick of Another Kind	Air Force One 'Ensign'	
1987	Emanon	TV Director	
1990	Eternity	Stage Manager	
1992	The Double 0 Kid	Room Service Bellman	
2000	The Million Dollar Kid	TV Anchor	
2003	Urusei Yatsura: Only You	Chibi (voice)	English-language version
2003	Urusei Yatsura 3: Remember My Love	Chibi (voice)	English-language version
2004	Urusei Yatsura 4: Lum the Forever	Chibi (voice)	English-language version
2004	Urusei Yatsura: The Final Chapter	Additional voices	English-language version
2005	Urusei Yatsura: Always My Darling	Chibi (voice)	English-language version
2009	Opposite Day	Charles Tormell	
2015	A Christmas Eve Miracle	Mr. Ralph	
2016	JL Ranch	Man in Black Suit	
2018	The Ghost Beyond	Benjamin	
2020	JL Family Ranch 2	Todd	

=== Television ===
==== Writer/Producer ====
Year	Title	Producer	Writer	Other	Director(s)	Notes
1987	Mike's Talent Show	Executive	No	No	Jay Dubin	Television films
1992	Illusions	Yes	No	No	Victor Kulle	Television films
1995	The Tin Soldier	Yes	No	No	Jon Voight and Gregory Gieras	Television films
1999	Murder in a Small Town	Yes	No	No	Joyce Chopra	Television films
1999	Boys Will Be Boys	Yes	No	No	Dom DeLuise	Television films
1999	Arthur's Quest	Yes	No	No	Neil Mandt	Television films
1999	The Lady in Question	Yes	No	No	Joyce Chopra	Television films
1999	Noah's Ark	No	No	Yes	John Irvin	2 episodes
2000	The Princess & the Barrio Boy	Yes	Story	No	Tony Plana	Television films
2002	Project Viper	Executive	No	No	Jim Wynorski	Television films
2002	ChromiumBlue.com	Executive	No	No	Zalman King and Scott Sampler	13 episodes
2005	The Karate Dog	Yes	Yes	Yes	Bob Clark	Television film
2011	A Christmas Wish	Executive	No	No	Craig Clyde	Television film
2013-2015	Baby Geniuses Television Series	Yes	Yes	No	Sean McNamara	7 episodes
2019	Roseanne Barr & Rabbi Shmuley Show	Yes	No	No	Sean McNamara	Television special

==== Actor ====
Year	Title	Role	Notes
1975	The Secrets of Isis	Kevin McCauley	Episode: ''Rockhound's Roost''
1995	The Tin Soldier	Newscaster	Television film

== Personal life ==
Paul has two siblings, Stuart Paul (an actor and director) and Bonnie Paul (an actress). His niece is actress Skyler Shaye.
