= White Chicks =

2004 film by Keenen Ivory Wayans

- Theatrical release poster
- Directed by: Keenen Ivory Wayans
- Screenplay by: Keenen Ivory Wayans; Shawn Wayans; Marlon Wayans; Andy McElfresh; Michael Anthony Snowden; Xavier Cook
- Story by: Keenen Ivory Wayans; Shawn Wayans; Marlon Wayans
- Produced by: Keenen Ivory Wayans; Shawn Wayans; Marlon Wayans; Rick Alvarez; Lee R. Mayes
- Starring: Shawn Wayans; Marlon Wayans; Jaime King; Frankie Faison; Lochlyn Munro; John Heard
- Cinematography: Steven Bernstein
- Edited by: Jeffrey Stephen Gourson; Stuart Pappé
- Music by: Teddy Castellucci
- Production companies: Columbia Pictures; Revolution Studios; Gone North Productions
- Distributed by: Sony Pictures Releasing
- Release date: June 23, 2004
- Running time: 109 minutes
- Country: United States
- Language: English
- Budget: $37 million
- Box office: $113.1 million

White Chicks is a 2004 American buddy comedy film directed by Keenen Ivory Wayans from a screenplay co-written by Wayans, Andy McElfresh, Michael Anthony Snowden, with additional contributions by and starring his brothers Marlon and Shawn. It also stars Jaime King, Frankie Faison, Lochlyn Munro, and John Heard. In the film, two black FBI agent brothers go undercover as white women to protect two hotel heiresses from a kidnapping plot targeting socialites.

Principal photography for White Chicks took place in Chilliwack and Victoria in British Columbia, and in The Hamptons in New York. It was theatrically released in the United States on June 23, 2004. The film received generally negative reviews upon release, and was nominated for five Golden Raspberry Awards, including Worst Picture. It grossed over $113.1 million worldwide, and has since come to be regarded as a cult classic.

== Plot ==
In New York City, FBI agent brothers Marcus and Kevin Copeland inadvertently ruin a drug bust. Their boss, Chief Elliott Gordon, offers them a reprieve if they safely escort sisters Brittany and Tiffany Wilson - the rich, shallow socialite daughters of the Wilson Cruiseliners CEO, whom the police suspect are the next targets in a string of high-profile kidnappings - to a weekend-long fashion event in the Hamptons. On the drive, the sisters' dog Baby nearly leaps out of the car window, causing Kevin to lose control of the car. The sisters suffer minor facial cuts and refuse to be seen with them. Kevin sends them into hiding and has his makeup expert friend Josh create prosthetic disguises so he and Marcus can replace the sisters. Kevin as Brittany and Marcus as Tiffany meet the sisters' three best friends – Lisa Anderson, Karen Googlestein, and Tori Wilson – as well as their rivals, Heather and Megan Vandergeld, and their father Warren. Gordon, along with colleagues Vincent Gomez and Jake Harper, pose as hotel staff to watch Kevin and Marcus, with both parties unaware of each other. At the hotel, a black pro basketball player Latrell Spencer, who is attracted exclusively to 'white chicks', takes a strong interest in Marcus/Tiffany, and Kevin sets his sights on New York One News reporter Denise Porter.

At the Vandergelds' annual charity auction, Latrell wins a dinner date at a restaurant with Marcus/Tiffany. Believing Denise likes rich men, Kevin pretends to be Latrell, takes Latrell's car as he takes Marcus/Tiffany on the date, to drive Denise to Latrell's house. There, he hears that the suspect, Ted Burton, has become rich after being released from prison and has no incentive to kidnap the Wilsons. With Kevin becoming romantically involved with Denise and Marcus/Tiffany unsuccessfully trying to reject Latrell, their combined antics put them under Gomez and Harper's suspicion.

At a nightclub, Heather kisses Karen's boyfriend Heath, Kevin and Marcus win a dance-off against the Vandergelds, and a drugged Latrell accidentally sleeps with Heath's friend Russ. Kevin and Marcus learn from a drunk Karen that Warren is penniless and has been taking loans from her father, and conclude that Warren is the mastermind behind the kidnappings. The next day, the real Brittany and Tiffany arrive at the hotel and discover they are being impersonated. They arrive in the Hamptons intent on exposing their "clones", as does Marcus' wife Gina, believing he is cheating on her. Realizing the Wilsons are being impersonated by men, Gomez and Harper aim to expose them, but accidentally strip down the real Brittany and Tiffany in front of Chief Gordon. A furious Gordon suspends Gomez and Harper and fires the Copelands. Having lost his job and possibly his wife, Marcus scolds Kevin for always dragging him into trouble.

Later, Kevin and Marcus discover that Warren had embezzled money through his charity. Marcus convinces Kevin to not tell Gordon and to instead redeem themselves with Gomez and Harper's help. Posing again as the Wilsons, they are chosen to perform in a final fashion show in which the real Wilsons are also performing. During the show, the Vandergelds, furious at having been replaced on the catwalk, try to sabotage their "rivals", but end up being humiliated by Karen, Lisa, and Tori. The real Brittany and Tiffany appear and expose Kevin and Marcus, causing mass confusion. Warren begins the kidnapping, but incorrectly captures Marcus/Tiffany and Kevin/Brittany. This begins a fight between the Copelands and Heath and Russ, who are Warren's accomplices. Warren soon captures the real sisters and explains his financial troubles to his wife and daughters, unaware that his confession is being filmed by reporter Denise. In the ensuing scuffle, Kevin is nearly shot protecting Denise, Latrell is shot protecting Marcus/Tiffany, and Kevin shoots Warren in the shoulder.

Marcus and Kevin arrest Warren while Gomez and Harper arrest Heath and Russ. Afterward, their true identities are revealed. Latrell is dismayed that Marcus is not white, seemingly not bothered that he is a man. Gordon reinstates the Copelands, Gomez, and Harper. Marcus reconciles with Gina, Kevin and Denise begin a relationship, and Latrell wins over the real Brittany and Tiffany. Tori, Lisa, and Karen admit they liked Brittany and Tiffany a lot more when Marcus and Kevin were them, and the five agree to remain friends and go shopping together.

== Cast ==
- Shawn Wayans as Kevin Copeland/Brittany Wilson
- Marlon Wayans as Marcus Anthony Copeland II/Tiffany Wilson
- John Heard as Warren Vandergeld
- Busy Philipps as Karen Googlestein
- Jessica Cauffiel as Tori Wilson
- Jennifer Carpenter as Lisa Anderson
- Frankie Faison as Chief Elliott Gordon
- Lochlyn Munro as Agent Jake Harper
- Eddie Velez as Agent Vincent Gomez
- Jaime King as Heather Vandergeld
- Brittany Daniel as Megan Vandergeld
- Terry Crews as Latrell Spencer
- Rochelle Aytes as Denise Porter
- Maitland Ward as Brittany Wilson
- Anne Dudek as Tiffany Wilson
- Faune A. Chambers as Gina Copeland
- Drew Sidora as Shaunice
- John Reardon as Heath
- Steven Grayhm as Russ
- Casey Lee as Tony

== Production ==
After the success of Scary Movie 2 (2001), the Wayans brothers —Marlon, Shawn and Keenen Ivory— who co-wrote both Scary Movie (2000) and the sequel, pitched the idea for White Chicks at the same time they were pitching their idea for a third Scary Movie film. However, as Miramax tried to make the Wayans take a pay cut while making a deal for their pay offer despite providing the story basis, the Wayans chose to leave Scary Movie 3 (2003) and prioritize White Chicks as higher offers were being made upon its greenlighting. Filming occurred partly in Chilliwack, British Columbia, including the exterior scenes at the Hamptons and Victoria, British Columbia.

== Soundtrack ==
1. "Latin Thugs" – Cypress Hill
2. "Hey Ms. Wilson" – The Penfifteen Club
3. "Shake It (Like a White Girl)" – Jesse Jaymes (Copeland)
4. "A Thousand Miles" – Vanessa Carlton
5. "Realest Niggas" – 50 Cent, The Notorious B.I.G.
6. "White Girls" – Mighty Casey
7. "Dance City" – Oscar Hernandez
8. "Trouble" – P!nk
9. "U Can't Touch This" – MC Hammer
10. "Dance, Dance, Dance" – The Beach Boys
11. "Guantanamera" – Jose Fernandez Diaz
12. "It's My Life" – No Doubt
13. "(I Got That) Boom Boom" – Britney Spears featuring Ying Yang Twins
14. "Bounce" (The Bandit Club Remix) – Stock, IC Green
15. "Get Low" – Lil Jon & the East Side Boyz featuring Ying Yang Twins
16. "Crazy in Love" – Beyoncé featuring Jay-Z
17. "It's Tricky" – Run–D.M.C.
18. "This Love" – Maroon 5
19. "No Control" – Blackfire
20. "I Wanna Know" – Joe
21. "Tipsy" – J-Kwon
22. "Satisfaction" – Benny Benassi
23. "Let's Get It Started" – Black Eyed Peas
24. "Move Your Feet" – Junior Senior
25. "I Need Your Love Tonight" – Elvis Presley
26. "Girls Just Want to Have Fun" – Cyndi Lauper
27. "TRU Homies" - TRU

== Release ==
White Chicks was theatrically released in the United States on June 23, 2004. Columbia TriStar Home Entertainment released the film on VHS and DVD in the United States on October 26, 2004, and was also released on UMD on November 29, 2005.

== Reception ==
=== Box office ===
The film grossed $19.7 million in its opening weekend, taking the #2 spot. It finished with $70.8 million at the box office in the United States, and $42.3 million in other territories, for a worldwide total of $113.1 million, against a budget of $37 million. The film was released in the United Kingdom on October 15, 2004, and opened at #2, behind Shark Tale.

=== Critical response ===
The film received negative reviews from critics upon release. On the review aggregator website Rotten Tomatoes, 15% of 126 critics' reviews are positive, with an average rating of 3.9/10. The website's consensus reads: "Scattershot comedy that's silly and obvious." Metacritic, which uses a weighted average, assigned the film a score of 41 out of 100, based on 31 critics, indicating "mixed or average" reviews. Audiences polled by CinemaScore gave the film an average grade of "B+" on an A+ to F scale.

In his negative review, Dave Kehr of New York Times stated that "Most movies require some suspension of disbelief. But White Chicks... requires something more radical than that. A full frontal lobotomy might be a good place to start." Film critic Richard Roeper put the film at #1 on his list of the worst films of 2004, amongst claims of unconvincing prosthetics and racism. Roger Ebert of the Chicago Sun-Times gave the film 1 and 1/2 stars out of four and said "Here is a film so dreary and conventional that it took an act of the will to keep me in the theater." He subsequently named the film the seventh worst film of 2004. Owen Gleiberman from Entertainment Weekly said "A tawdry excuse for a movie, but it has a handful of shameless giggles", and rated the film "C+".

David Rooney of Variety gave a positive review, and stated that the film "scores more hits than misses." USA Today's Mike Clark rated it 3/4, and said "As with every other genre, there's a right way and a wrong way to handle dude-lawman comedies. Chicks does it right a lot of the time."

White Chicks was nominated for five Razzies, including Worst Picture, Worst Actress for the Wayans brothers in drag, Worst Director, Worst Screenplay and Worst Screen Couple. It lost in all categories to Catwoman and Fahrenheit 9/11. At the 2004 Stinkers Bad Movie Awards, the film received nominations for Worst Picture, Worst Director (Keenan Ivory Wayans), Most Painfully Unfunny Comedy, Worst On-Screen Couple (Shawn and Marlon Wayans), and Least "Special" Special Effects. Its only win was for Most Painfully Unfunny Comedy.

=== Legacy ===
The song "A Thousand Miles" by Vanessa Carlton became heavily associated with Terry Crews for his performance of it in the film.

== Cultural impact ==
In 2026, during the FIFA World Cup, an artificial intelligence-generated video based on a scene from the film, featuring the song "A Thousand Miles", went viral and garnered millions of views. The video depicts Erling Haaland and Vinícius Júnior.

== Proposed sequel ==
In August 2009, a sequel to the film was announced by Sony, though they later canceled the project. A sequel was confirmed to be in the works in March 2018. On June 30, 2019, Terry Crews confirmed a sequel on the program Watch What Happens Live. Marlon Wayans confirmed that this information was not meant to leak and that the deal had not yet been confirmed. In 2022, Marlon dismissed the idea of a sequel, stating that he did not want to go through the long and complicated makeup process again unless it could be done with digital effects. On February 19, 2026, he confirmed that a sequel to White Chicks will happen if Scary Movie is successful. Marlon reprised his role as Tiffany in the film through a parody scene of The Substance.

== See also ==
- Cross-dressing in film and television
- Nuns on the Run, a comedy film of 1990 starring Eric Idle and Robbie Coltrane. It tells a similar story, in which two criminals pose as nuns to hide from a rival gang.
- Some Like It Hot, a comedy film of 1959 starring Tony Curtis and Jack Lemmon as two male musicians dressing as women to hide from gangsters in Florida.
