= Crystal Sky Pictures =

American film production company

- Type: Independent
- Industry: Film
- Predecessor: Paul Entertainment
- Founded: 1991; 35 years ago
- Founder: Steven Paul
- Headquarters: Los Angeles, California, U.S.
- Key people: Steven Paul (Chairman/CEO)
- Website: crystalsky.com (archive)

Crystal Sky Pictures is an American independent film production company founded in 1991 and owned by producer Steven Paul.

The company supplanted Paul Entertainment, a previous production company that was headed by Stuart and Steven Paul that was formed in 1978. The company's first production was Falling in Love Again, which was released in 1980.

The company's predecessor, Paul Entertainment, planned a three-picture program by 1988, and Eric Breiman said that they would run the studio, and would have co-production partner Victory Productions International to create their own feature films.

The company also had its home video vision, Paul Home Vision, which was signed into a deal with Academy Entertainment for release of its titles in 1988.

In 1992, the company had signed a deal with Prism Entertainment via Prism Pictures to receive distribution of the company's motion pictures.

In 1994, the company signed a deal with Triumph Releasing Corporation to produce and distribute family films. In 2000, the company formed a credit union deal with MM Media and VCL Communications to finance the company's motion pictures.

In 2000, the company bought out the licensing rights to the Ghost Rider comic book from Marvel Studios. The company along with Paramount Pictures, later acquired the rights to the Deathlok comic book character in 2001, followed by Werewolf by Night with Dimension Films in 2001. Both of its comic book characters Crystal Sky once held eventually reverted to Marvel Studios after the success of the Marvel Cinematic Universe.

In 2005, Crystal Sky acquired the films rights to the Castlevania series of video games. The company signed a theatrical financing deal with Grosvenor Park Productions in 2008 valued at $200 million. The deal covered five films including the proposed Castlevania film, though that film was later removed from development.

== Films ==
| Year | Title | Notes |
|---|---|---|
| 1992 | The Double 0 Kid | |
| 1999 | Baby Geniuses | |
| 2001 | The Musketeer | |
| 2004 | Superbabies: Baby Geniuses 2 | |
| 2005 | Come To Me | |
| 2007 | Ghost Rider | |
| 2007 | Bratz | |
| 2007 | Big Stan | Direct-to-video |
| 2008 | Doomsday | |
| 2009 | Opposite Day | |
| 2009 | Tekken | Direct-to-video in North America |
| 2009 | Robosapien: Rebooted | |
| 2011 | Ghost Rider: Spirit of Vengeance | |
| 2014 | Tekken 2: Kazuya's Revenge | Limited theatrical release in Asia |
| 2016 | JL Ranch | |
| 2017 | Ghost in the Shell | Uncredited |
