= 25th Golden Raspberry Awards =

Award ceremony presented by the Golden Raspberry Award Foundation in 2004

- Date: February 26, 2005
- Site: Ivar Theatre, Hollywood, California

Highlights
- Worst Picture: Catwoman
- Most awards: Catwoman / Fahrenheit 9/11 (4)
- Most nominations: Catwoman (7)

The 25th Golden Raspberry Awards, or Razzies, were held on February 26, 2005, at the Ivar Theatre in Hollywood, California, to honor the worst films the film industry had to offer in 2004. To celebrate the 25th anniversary of the Golden Raspberry Awards, four special categories—Worst Razzie Loser of Our First 25 Years, Worst "Comedy" of Our First 25 Years, Worst "Drama" of Our First 25 Years, and Worst "Musical" of Our First 25 Years—were created.

On January 24, 2005, the nominees were announced for the 25th Golden Raspberry Awards. Leading the pack was a tie between the late summer film Catwoman and Fahrenheit 9/11, each of which won four Razzies, even though the latter was not nominated for Worst Picture. Catwoman received the greatest number of nominations (seven), followed by Alexander with six nominations. On February 26, 2005, the winners were announced.

The Ivar Theatre was rented using proceeds from an auction of Ben Affleck's broken trophy from the previous year, which Affleck smashed during an appearance on Larry King Live.

Halle Berry collected her award in person. She was the first to do so since 2001, when Tom Green arrived to receive his five Razzies for Freddy Got Fingered. Berry was quoted as saying "If you aren't able to be a good loser you're not able to be a good winner." Berry mocked her 2002 Oscar acceptance speech, acting tearful and saying, "I never thought this would happen to me." She then responded to some critics by holding up her Oscar and saying, "They can't take it away, my name's on it!" Screenwriter Michael Ferris also appeared to pick his Worst Screenplay award.

== Winners and nominees ==
Winner (in bold)

Category	Picture	Recipient
Worst Picture		**Catwoman (Warner Bros.)**
Worst Picture		Alexander (Warner Bros.)
Worst Picture		Superbabies: Baby Geniuses 2 (Triumph Films)
Worst Picture		Surviving Christmas (DreamWorks)
Worst Picture		White Chicks (Columbia / Revolution)
Worst Actor	George W. Bush	**George W. Bush in Fahrenheit 9/11 as Himself**
Worst Actor	George W. Bush	Ben Affleck in Jersey Girl and Surviving Christmas as Ollie Trinke and Drew Latham (respectively)
Worst Actor	George W. Bush	Vin Diesel in The Chronicles of Riddick as Riddick
Worst Actor	George W. Bush	Colin Farrell in Alexander as Alexander the Great
Worst Actor	George W. Bush	Ben Stiller in Along Came Polly, Anchorman: The Legend of Ron Burgundy, Dodgeball: A True Underdog Story, Envy and Starsky & Hutch as Reuben Feffer, Arturo Mendez, White Goodman, Tim Dingman and David Starsky (respectively)
Worst Actress	Halle Berry	**Halle Berry in Catwoman as Patience Phillips / Catwoman**
Worst Actress	Halle Berry	Hilary Duff in A Cinderella Story and Raise Your Voice as Sam Montgomery and Terri Fletcher (respectively)
Worst Actress	Halle Berry	Angelina Jolie in Alexander and Taking Lives as Queen Olympias and Illeana Scott (respectively)
Worst Actress	Halle Berry	Mary-Kate and Ashley Olsen in New York Minute as Roxy and Jane Ryan
Worst Actress	Halle Berry	Shawn and Marlon Wayans (the Wayans "sisters") in White Chicks as Brittany and Tiffany Wilson
Worst Supporting Actor	Donald Rumsfeld	**Donald Rumsfeld in Fahrenheit 9/11 as Himself**
Worst Supporting Actor	Donald Rumsfeld	Val Kilmer in Alexander as King Philip II
Worst Supporting Actor	Donald Rumsfeld	Arnold Schwarzenegger in Around the World in 80 Days as Prince Hapi
Worst Supporting Actor	Donald Rumsfeld	Jon Voight in Superbabies: Baby Geniuses 2 as Bill Biscane
Worst Supporting Actor	Donald Rumsfeld	Lambert Wilson in Catwoman as George Hedare
Worst Supporting Actress	Britney Spears	**Britney Spears in Fahrenheit 9/11 as Herself**
Worst Supporting Actress	Britney Spears	Carmen Electra in Starsky & Hutch as Stacey Haack
Worst Supporting Actress	Britney Spears	Jennifer Lopez in Jersey Girl as Gertrude Steiney
Worst Supporting Actress	Britney Spears	Condoleezza Rice in Fahrenheit 9/11 as Herself
Worst Supporting Actress	Britney Spears	Sharon Stone in Catwoman as Laurel Hedare
Worst Screen Couple	George W. Bush Condoleezza Rice	**George W. Bush and either Condoleezza Rice or his pet goat in Fahrenheit 9/11**
Worst Screen Couple	George W. Bush Condoleezza Rice	Ben Affleck and either Jennifer Lopez or Liv Tyler in Jersey Girl
Worst Screen Couple	George W. Bush Condoleezza Rice	Halle Berry and either Benjamin Bratt or Sharon Stone in Catwoman
Worst Screen Couple	George W. Bush Condoleezza Rice	Mary-Kate and Ashley Olsen in New York Minute
Worst Screen Couple	George W. Bush Condoleezza Rice	The Wayans brothers (Shawn and Marlon Wayans) ("in or out of drag") in White Chicks
Worst Remake or Sequel		**Scooby-Doo 2: Monsters Unleashed (Warner Bros.)**
Worst Remake or Sequel		Alien vs. Predator (Fox)
Worst Remake or Sequel		Anacondas: The Hunt for the Blood Orchid (Screen Gems)
Worst Remake or Sequel		Around the World in 80 Days (Disney)
Worst Remake or Sequel		Exorcist: The Beginning (Warner Bros.)
Worst Director		**Pitof for Catwoman**
Worst Director		Bob Clark for Superbabies: Baby Geniuses 2
Worst Director		Renny Harlin and/or Paul Schrader for Exorcist: The Beginning
Worst Director		Oliver Stone for Alexander
Worst Director		Keenen Ivory Wayans for White Chicks
Worst Screenplay	John Rogers	**Catwoman, screenplay by John Brancato & Michael Ferris & John Rogers, story by Theresa Rebeck and Brancato & Ferris, based on the DC Comics character created by Bob Kane and Bill Finger**
Worst Screenplay	John Rogers	Alexander, written by Oliver Stone, Christopher Kyle and Laeta Kalogridis, based on the works by Robin Lane Fox
Worst Screenplay	John Rogers	Superbabies: Baby Geniuses 2, story by Steven Paul, screenplay by Gregory Poppen
Worst Screenplay	John Rogers	Surviving Christmas, screenplay by Deborah Kaplan, Harry Elfont, Jeffrey Ventimilia & Joshua Sternin
Worst Screenplay	John Rogers	White Chicks, screenplay by Keenen Ivory, Shawn, Marlon Wayans, Andy McElfresh, Michael Anthony Snowden & Xavier Cook

=== Special "Worst of Our First 25 Years" Awards ===
Winner (in bold)

Category		Recipient
Worst Razzie Loser of Our First 25 Years	Arnold Schwarzenegger	**Arnold Schwarzenegger (with 8 nominations total, including 1 in 2004)**
Worst Razzie Loser of Our First 25 Years	Arnold Schwarzenegger	Kim Basinger (with 7 nominations total)
Worst Razzie Loser of Our First 25 Years	Arnold Schwarzenegger	Angelina Jolie (with 7 nominations, including 2 in 2004)
Worst Razzie Loser of Our First 25 Years	Arnold Schwarzenegger	Ryan O'Neal (with 6 nominations total)
Worst Razzie Loser of Our First 25 Years	Arnold Schwarzenegger	Keanu Reeves (with 7 nominations)
Worst "Drama" of Our First 25 Years		**Battlefield Earth (Warner Bros.) (2000)**
Worst "Drama" of Our First 25 Years		The Lonely Lady (Universal) (1983)
Worst "Drama" of Our First 25 Years		Mommie Dearest (Paramount) (1981)
Worst "Drama" of Our First 25 Years		Showgirls (MGM / UA) (1995)
Worst "Drama" of Our First 25 Years		Swept Away (Screen Gems) (2002)
Worst "Comedy" of Our First 25 Years		**Gigli (Columbia / Revolution Studios) (2003)**
Worst "Comedy" of Our First 25 Years		The Adventures of Pluto Nash (Warner Bros.) (2002)
Worst "Comedy" of Our First 25 Years		The Cat in the Hat (DreamWorks / Universal) (2003)
Worst "Comedy" of Our First 25 Years		Freddy Got Fingered (Fox) (2001)
Worst "Comedy" of Our First 25 Years		Leonard Part 6 (Columbia) (1987)
Worst "Musical" of Our First 25 Years		**From Justin to Kelly (Fox) (2003)**
Worst "Musical" of Our First 25 Years		Can't Stop the Music (AFD) (1980)
Worst "Musical" of Our First 25 Years		Glitter (Columbia / Fox) (2001)
Worst "Musical" of Our First 25 Years		Rhinestone (Fox) (1984)
Worst "Musical" of Our First 25 Years		Spice World (Columbia) (1998)
Worst "Musical" of Our First 25 Years		Xanadu (Universal) (1980)

== Criticism ==
This edition of the Razzies was notable as the first to give nominations to a movie that was neither a critical nor a box-office bomb: the Palme d'Or winning documentary Fahrenheit 9/11. It received nominations not because the movie itself was of poor quality, but because the film depicted political figures' mishandling of the September 11 attacks and the Iraq War. The Razzies, which had previously steered clear of politics, received criticism from some quarters for nominating the stock footage "performances" of George W. Bush, Donald Rumsfeld, and Condoleezza Rice. (The former two won their awards while Britney Spears won the Razzie for Worst Supporting Actress over Rice; her role in Fahrenheit 9/11 is just fifteen seconds long.)

== Films with multiple nominations ==
These films received multiple nominations:

Nominations	Films
7	Catwoman
6	Alexander
5	Fahrenheit 9/11
5	White Chicks
4	Superbabies: Baby Geniuses 2
3	Jersey Girl
3	Surviving Christmas
2	Around the World in 80 Days
2	Exorcist: The Beginning
2	New York Minute
2	Starsky & Hutch

== See also ==
- 2004 in film
- 77th Academy Awards
- 58th British Academy Film Awards
- 62nd Golden Globe Awards
- 11th Screen Actors Guild Awards
