= 2004 Stinkers Bad Movie Awards =

Award ceremony presented by the Stinkers Bad Movie Awards in 2006

27th Stinkers Bad Movie Awards
- Date: 2005

Highlights
- Worst Film: Catwoman
- Most awards: Catwoman (5)
- Most nominations: Alexander (9)

The 27th Stinkers Bad Movie Awards were released by the Hastings Bad Cinema Society in 2005 to honour the worst films the film industry had to offer in 2004. Alexander received the most nominations with nine. All nominees and winners, with respective percentages of votes for each category, are listed below. Dishonourable mentions are also featured for Worst Picture (64 total).

== Winners and nominees ==
=== Worst Picture ===
Film	Percentage of Votes
Catwoman (Warner Bros.)	34%
Alexander (Warner Bros.)	18%
Superbabies: Baby Geniuses 2 (Sony)	12%
Van Helsing (Universal)	15%
White Chicks (Sony)	21%

==== Dishonourable Mentions ====
- Against the Ropes (Paramount)
- Agent Cody Banks 2: Destination London (MGM)
- The Alamo (Touchstone)
- Alien vs. Predator (FOX)
- Along Came Polly (Universal)
- Anacondas: The Hunt for the Blood Orchid (Sony)
- Around the World in 80 Days (Disney)
- The Big Bounce (Warner Bros.)
- Bridget Jones: The Edge of Reason (Universal)
- The Brown Bunny (Wellspring)
- The Butterfly Effect (New Line)
- Catch That Kid (FOX)
- Christmas with the Kranks (Sony)
- A Cinderella Story (Warner Bros.)
- Closer (Sony)
- The Day After Tomorrow (FOX)
- Dirty Dancing: Havana Nights (Lionsgate)
- The Dreamers (FOX)
- Envy (DreamWorks)
- Eternal Sunshine of the Spotless Mind (Focus)
- Eulogy (Lionsgate)
- Exorcist: The Beginning (Warner Bros.)
- Fahrenheit 9/11 (Lionsgate)
- Fat Albert (FOX)
- 50 First Dates (Sony)
- Garfield: The Movie (FOX)
- Gold Diggers (MGM)
- Hidalgo (Touchstone)
- Home on the Range (Disney)
- I Heart Huckabees (FOX)
- Jersey Girl (Miramax)
- King Arthur (Touchstone)
- The Ladykillers (Touchstone)
- The Life Aquatic With Steve Zissou (Touchstone)
- Little Black Book (Sony)
- My Baby's Daddy (Miramax)
- New York Minute (Warner Bros.)
- The Passion of the Christ (Icon)
- The Perfect Score (Paramount)
- The Phantom of the Opera (Warner Bros.)
- The Prince and Me (Paramount)
- The Punisher (Lionsgate)
- Raise Your Voice (New Line)
- Raising Helen (Touchstone)
- Scooby-Doo 2: Monsters Unleashed (Warner Bros.)
- Shall We Dance? (Miramax)
- Shark Tale (DreamWorks Animation)
- She Hate Me (Sony)
- Sleepover (MGM)
- Soul Plane (MGM)
- Spanglish (Sony)
- Starsky & Hutch (Warner Bros., Dimension)
- The Stepford Wives (Paramount)
- Surviving Christmas (DreamWorks)
- Taxi (FOX)
- Thunderbirds (Universal)
- Torque (Warner Bros.)
- Twisted (Paramount)
- The Village (Touchstone)
- Walking Tall (MGM)
- The Whole Ten Yards (Warner Bros.)
- Wicker Park (MGM)
- Win a Date with Tad Hamilton! (DreamWorks)
- You Got Served (Sony)
- Yu-Gi-Oh! The Movie: Pyramid of Light (Warner Bros.)

=== Worst Director ===
Recipient	Percentage of Votes
Pitof for Catwoman	43%
Bob Clark for Superbabies: Baby Geniuses 2	11%
Vincent Gallo for The Brown Bunny	8%
Oliver Stone for Alexander	18%
Keenen Ivory Wayans for White Chicks	20%

=== Worst Actor ===
Recipient	Percentage of Votes
Ben Affleck in Jersey Girl and Surviving Christmas	37%
Vin Diesel in The Chronicles of Riddick	23%
Colin Farrell in Alexander	20%
Brad Pitt in Troy	5%
Ben Stiller in Along Came Polly, DodgeBall: A True Underdog Story, Envy, Meet The Fockers, and Starsky & Hutch	15%

=== Worst Actress ===
Recipient	Percentage of Votes
Halle Berry in Catwoman	32%
Kate Beckinsale in Van Helsing	13%
Tea Leoni in Spanglish	8%
Mary Kate and Ashley Olsen in New York Minute	25%
Meg Ryan in Against the Ropes	22%

=== Worst Supporting Actor ===
Recipient	Percentage of Votes
Arnold Schwarzenegger in Around the World in 80 Days	32%
Soren Fulton in Thunderbirds	12%
Woody Harrelson in She Hate Me	8%
Kevin Pollak in The Whole Ten Yards	26%
Jon Voight in Superbabies: Baby Geniuses 2	22%

=== Worst Supporting Actress ===
Recipient	Percentage of Votes
Sharon Stone in Catwoman	43%
Rosario Dawson in Alexander	15%
Farrah Fawcett in The Cookout	17%
Angelina Jolie in Alexander	20%
Ann-Margret in Taxi	5%

=== Worst Screenplay ===
Recipient	Percentage of Votes
Christmas with the Kranks (Sony), written by Chris Columbus	30%
Alexander (Warner Bros.), written by Christopher Kyle, Oliver Stone, and Laeta Kalogridis; partially based on the 1973 book Alexander the Great	28%
Bridget Jones: The Edge of Reason (Universal), written by Adam Brooks, Richard Curtis, Andrew Davies, and Helen Fielding	3%
Catwoman (Warner Bros.), screenplay by John Brancato, John Brancato, and John Rogers; based on a story by Theresa Rebeck, Brancato, and Ferris	21%
Superbabies: Baby Geniuses 2 (Sony), written by Gregory Poppen	18%

=== Most Painfully Unfunny Comedy ===
Recipient	Percentage of Votes
White Chicks (Sony)	41%
Bridget Jones: The Edge of Reason (Universal)	7%
The Cookout (Lionsgate)	7%
Christmas with the Kranks (Sony)	30%
Superbabies: Baby Geniuses 2 (Sony)	15%

=== Worst Resurrection of a TV Show ===
Recipient	Percentage of Votes
Scooby-Doo 2: Monsters Unleashed (Warner Bros.)	54%
Fat Albert (FOX)	30%
Starsky & Hutch (Warner Bros., Dimension)	19%

=== Most Intrusive Musical Score ===
Recipient	Percentage of Votes
Alexander (Warner Bros.)	42%
Catwoman (Warner Bros.)	20%
Christmas with the Kranks (Sony)	15%
Envy (DreamWorks)	10%
Jersey Girl (Miramax)	13%

=== Worst Song or Song Performance in a Film or Its End Credits ===
Recipient	Percentage of Votes
"Holla!" by Baha Men from Garfield: The Movie	31%
"Fat Albert Theme (Gonna Have a Good Time)" by Kenan Thompson from Fat Albert	25%
"Hey Joe" by Michael Pitt from The Dreamers	15%
"Hot Chocolate" by Tom Hanks from The Polar Express	22%
"Rock 'n' Roll McDonald's" by Wesley Willis from Super Size Me	7%

=== Worst Sequel ===
Recipient	Percentage of Votes
The Whole Ten Yards (Warner Bros.)	39%
Bridget Jones: The Edge of Reason (Universal)	13%
Dirty Dancing: Havana Nights (Lionsgate)	10%
Scooby Doo 2: Monsters Unleashed (Warner Bros.)	8%
Superbabies: Baby Geniuses 2 (Sony)	30%

=== Most Unwelcome Remake ===
Recipient	Percentage of Votes
Around the World in 80 Days (Disney)	26%
The Alamo (Touchstone)	23%
Alfie (Paramount)	13%
The Stepford Wives (Paramount)	25%
Walking Tall (MGM)	13%

=== Worst On-Screen Couple ===
Recipient	Percentage of Votes
Queen Latifah and Jimmy Fallon in Taxi	34%
Vincent Gallo and Chloë Sevigny in The Brown Bunny	6%
Mary Kate and Ashley Olsen in New York Minute	20%
Adam Sandler and Tea Leoni in Spanglish	10%
Shawn and Marlon Wayans in White Chicks	30%

=== Most Annoying Fake Accent (Male) ===
Recipient	Percentage of Votes
Richard Roxburgh in Van Helsing	47%
Leonardo DiCaprio in The Aviator	3%
Brad Pitt in Troy	23%
Kurt Russell in Miracle	0%
Jon Voight in Superbabies: Baby Geniuses 2	27%

=== Most Annoying Fake Accent (Female) ===
Recipient	Percentage of Votes
Rosario Dawson and Angelina Jolie in Alexander	38%
Kate Beckinsale in Van Helsing	36%
Farrah Fawcett in The Cookout	8%
Meg Ryan in Against the Ropes	14%
Lusia Strus in 50 First Dates	4%

=== Least "Special" Special Effects ===
Recipient	Percentage of Votes
Catwoman (Warner Bros.)	37%
Alexander (Warner Bros.)	13%
Scooby Doo 2: Monsters Unleashed (Warner Bros.)	11%
Superbabies: Baby Geniuses 2 (Sony)	23%
White Chicks (Sony)	16%

=== Worst Christmas Movie ===
Recipient	Percentage of Votes
Christmas with the Kranks (Sony)	59%
The Polar Express (Warner Bros.)	15%
Surviving Christmas (DreamWorks)	26%

=== The Spencer Breslin Award (for Worst Performance by a Child in a Feature Role) ===
- Soren Fulton in Thunderbirds

== Films with multiple wins and nominations ==
The following films received multiple nominations:

Nominations	Film
9	Alexander
8	Superbabies: Baby Geniuses 2
7	Catwoman
5	White Chicks
4	Christmas with the Kranks
4	Van Helsing
3	Bridget Jones: The Edge of Reason
3	The Cookout
3	Scooby-Doo 2: Monsters Unleashed
2	Against the Ropes
2	Around the World in 80 Days
2	The Brown Bunny
2	Envy
2	Jersey Girl
2	New York Minute
2	The Polar Express
2	Spanglish
2	Surviving Christmas
2	Taxi
2	Thunderbirds
2	Troy
2	The Whole Ten Yards

The following films received multiple wins:

Wins	Film
5	Catwoman
2	Alexander
2	Around the World in 80 Days
2	Christmas with the Kranks
