= Bill Muller =

American journalist and film critic (born 1965)

William S. Muller (1964–2007) was an American journalist and film critic, primarily for The Arizona Republic newspaper. He switched positions from reporter to film critic in 2000.

== Background and career path ==
Bill Muller was born in New Jersey, grew up in Florida and Texas, and received a degree in political science from the University of Texas at Arlington. He began his journalism career at the Dallas Times Herald as a crime reporter. Then, he worked at the News and Observer in Raleigh, North Carolina, for two years.

In 1994, he joined The Arizona Republic, where he was an investigative reporter, and, starting in 2000, a film critic. He resided in Phoenix, Arizona, with his wife Deborah, a former movie studio publicist, and their two children.

Muller covered public utilities during the late 1990s for the Republic, including the issue of power industry deregulation. His credits also include an award-winning profile of U.S. Senator John McCain, articles exposing public corruption, and a regular column devoted to fantasy football. Later, as a film critic, "Some of Bill's reviews were more entertaining than the actual movies”, according to movie theater owner Dan Harkins.

== Reporter ==
Muller’s profile of John McCain won first place in the Arizona Press Club’s 1999 Awards for the Best Journalism in Arizona in government/politics reporting. The Arizona Press Club described Muller's "The life story of Arizona's maverick senator" as follows:

This story soared above the competitors. This entry was written masterfully and thoroughly. The reporting was excellent as the writer drew from a myriad of sources and materials. No stone was apparently left unturned in providing insight into the real John McCain. This is the story to read for anyone wondering who John McCain is but wanting a fair, unbiased accounting. Particularly impressive was the section on the complicated Keating Five scandal, which is often written about in confusing, hard-to-understand terms. The scandal was portrayed accurately, but the details were not skimped on in making it easy to understand for those unfamiliar with it.

Bill Muller's profile of John McCain originally appeared in The Arizona Republic and on azcentral.com on October 3, 1999. Reporter Dan Nowicki subsequently updated and revised the biography with additional material in January 2007.

== Film critic ==
Several years after Muller transformed himself from a reporter into a film critic, he wrote a review of the 2004 film Catwoman. His movie review took the form of a fictitious letter from the Academy of Motion Picture Arts and Sciences to the movie's star, Halle Berry, who had previously won an Academy Award in 2002. An excerpt of the letter follows:

While we at the Academy pride ourselves on having open minds and a strict noninterference policy concerning the roles chosen by our previous winners, we're forced to make an exception in your case. If you would consult the paperwork that arrived with your statuette, I would direct you to section E, subsection 2b, in which the Academy can, in limited circumstances, rescind an award and request return of the statuette. The specific language in question refers to winners who bring "shame, ridicule or derision" upon the Academy through "wanton, reckless and repeated dramatic incompetence." Given your consistent overacting and mugging in "Catwoman" (not to mention your previous work in "Gothika"), I think it would be difficult to argue this codicil does not apply. So, at this time, we'd like to ask for our award back.

For this, Muller received a 2004 award from the Arizona Press Club for best film, video and television criticism. The Press Club described his review of Catwoman as follows: “A review so fresh and clever that it's worth reading to the end, even knowing that the movie is a dog.”

== Planned scholarship in his honor ==
Bill Muller was diagnosed with kidney cancer in March 2006, and died on September 6, 2007, from heart failure caused by the disease, at the age of 42. The Walter Cronkite School of Journalism and Mass Communication at Arizona State University announced plans to create a scholarship in honor of Muller. According to the dean of the Cronkite School, “In many ways, Bill represents what we want our students to achieve….He was a reporter who upheld the highest standards of accuracy, thoroughness and thoughtfulness.”
