= Superbabies: Baby Geniuses 2 =

2004 film by Bob Clark

- Theatrical release poster
- Directed by: Bob Clark
- Screenplay by: Gregory Poppen
- Story by: Steven Paul
- Produced by: Steven Paul
- Starring: Jon Voight; Scott Baio; Vanessa Angel; Peter Wingfield; Justin Chatwin; Anastasia Trovato; Skyler Shaye; Leo, Gerry and Myles Fitzgerald
- Cinematography: Maher Maleh
- Edited by: Stan Cole
- Music by: Helmut Zerlett; Paul Zaza
- Production companies: Triumph Films; Crystal Sky Pictures; ApolloMedia; Hador Film Productions Limited
- Distributed by: Sony Pictures Entertainment
- Release date: August 27, 2004
- Running time: 88 minutes
- Country: United States
- Language: English
- Budget: $20 million
- Box office: $9.4 million

Superbabies: Baby Geniuses 2 (or Baby Geniuses 2: Superbabies or Baby Geniuses 2) is a 2004 American family action comedy film directed by Bob Clark and written by Gregory Poppen, from a story by Steven Paul. The sequel to the 1999 film Baby Geniuses, it stars Jon Voight, Scott Baio, and Vanessa Angel. Following the events of the first film, four babies can communicate with each other using baby talk and have knowledge of many secrets. The baby geniuses become involved in a scheme by media mogul Bill Biscane, later revealed to be known as Kane, who kidnaps children everywhere. Helping the geniuses is a legendary super-baby named Kahuna who stops Biscane's plots and saves children from being kidnapped by Biscane and his minions. He joins up with several other babies in an attempt to stop Biscane, who intends to use a state-of-the-art satellite system to control the world's population by brainwashing them and forcing people to not be active and watch TV for the rest of their lives.

Like its predecessor, Superbabies: Baby Geniuses 2 was panned by critics for its incoherent plot, creepy special effects and lazy humor and is often regarded as one of the worst films of all time. It was a box-office bomb, earning less than half its budget back, and was nominated at the 25th Golden Raspberry Awards for Worst Picture. It is the final film Bob Clark directed before his death in 2007. Three direct-to-video sequels followed the film, Baby Geniuses and the Mystery of the Crown Jewels (2013), Baby Geniuses and the Treasure of Egypt (2014), and Baby Geniuses and the Space Baby (2015), with Voight appearing as various characters throughout the series.

== Plot ==
The film starts with a group of babies in a daycare center. Archie Bobbins, the cousin of Sly and Whit from the first Baby Geniuses, tells his friends, Quentin "Finkie" Finkleman, Alex, and Rosita, a story about Kahuna, his distant relative. He says Kahuna is a super baby with super strength and seemingly doesn't age, and he once rescued a group of children from an evil orphanage at the Berlin Wall run by a villainous overseer named Bill Biscane.

Back in the present day, Archie's father Stan, Dan's brother, who runs the daycare and a chain just like them, allows his center to be used as a filming location by the now TV mogul Biscane/Kane, who is starting up his own TV channel. Archie, Quentin & Rosita sneak into Stan's office and decide to research Biscane but are caught. Archie overhears Biscane's helpers talking about their plan, accidentally attracting their attention, but he is rescued by Kahuna. Kylie the babysitter, who's also Archie's older cousin, takes them all out to the children's museum, but Biscane's helpers accidentally knock their disc into the stroller. After a pursuit, Kahuna rescues them all; he then takes them all to his base. Kahuna transforms the babies into "superbabies": Archie is Brain Boy, Alex is Bounce Baby, Rosita is Cupid Girl, and Finkleman is Baby Courageous.

Later, Archie eavesdrops on Kylie and Zach, Kahuna's helper; Zack tells her that Kahuna's father was a scientist and developed a formula for a potion. Kahuna enters the lab, and a mysterious person tries to drink the potion but accidentally chucks it when a storm breaks through the window. It lands and Kahuna drinks it, transforming him into a super baby. Kahuna's brother became jealous and annoyed at his brother, whom his friends call a freak. When the father died, Kahuna was put into an orphanage; after escaping, he set out to rescue babies and children everywhere.

The next day, Zack and Kylie find the disc that fell in the stroller earlier. The disc contains a clip of the program that is to be aired on Biscane's TV channel, followed by seemingly random code; they realize that Biscane is up to no good. The group spies on Biscane as he prepares to launch his channel, but Kahuna figures out that Biscane plans to take over the world through his TV channel by hypnotizing kids to never go outside, so he attacks the broadcast satellites, which causes him to disappear.

The babies decide to become their super alter egos to save Kahuna. With Stan, Archie's mom Jean, Kylie, and Zack with them, they return to Kahuna's hideout and become Bounce Baby, Cupid Girl, Brain Boy, and Baby Courageous. After having escaped his prison, Kahuna arrives, followed by Biscane and his goons. Biscane manages to get the disc he needs and begins to air the hypnotic clip on TV. Biscane then reveals the truth that he is actually Kahuna's jealous older brother, and is revealed to be the person who tried to drink the potion. The babies then knock Biscane into Kahuna's machine which unlocks a person's true self with the push of a button. However, upon activating it he is surprisingly turned into a baby, to his despair, and argues with his assistant over who gets to change his diapers. Kahuna reverses Biscane's TV clip and all the children decide to run and play outside. Kahuna tells Archie that he must leave and retire and though they'll always be friends. Kahuna leaves in his flying vehicle, waving at him and saying he'll always be a hero.

== Cast ==
- Jon Voight as Bill Biscane / Captain Kane
  - Jake Smith as Baby Biscane (voiced by Voight)
- Scott Baio as Stan Bobbins
- Vanessa Angel as Jean Bobbins
- Skyler Shaye as Kylie
- Leo, Gerry and Myles Fitzgerald as Kahuna (voiced by David A. Kaye)
  - Connor Christopher Lewis as Baby Kahuna
- Justin Chatwin as Zack
- Peter Wingfield as Crowe
- Shaun Sipos as Brandon
- Thomas Kretschmann as Roscoe
- Stefanie von Pfetten as Jennifer Kraft
- Dagmar Midcap as Herself
- Whoopi Goldberg as Herself
- Max and Michael Iles as Archie Bobbins / Brain Boy (voiced by Danny McKinnon)
- Jared and Jordan Scheideman as Quentin Finkleman / Baby Courageous (voiced by Jonathan Singleton)
- Maia and Keana Bastidas as Rosita / Cupid Girl (voiced by Melissa Montoya)
- Joshua and Maxwell Lockhart as Alex / Bouncing Boy (voiced by Rashad Hood)
- Anastasia Trovato as Tascha
- Devin Douglas Drewitz as Peter
- Jessica Amlee as Little Greta
- Alfonso Quijada as Muggles
- Nancy J. Lilley as Greta
  - Jessica Amlee as Little Greta
- Barry Greene as Kahuna's Father
- Garry Chalk as Police Captain
- Andrew Francis as Ken
- O-Town as Themselves

Note: Peter MacNicol's character Dan Bobbins is mentioned in the movie as the older brother of Scott Baio's character Stan Bobbins now working for UNICEF. In addition, in Stan's office, there's a picture of Dan Bobbins holding Sly & Whit (Leo, Gerry and Myles Fitzgerald's characters from the first film Baby Geniuses).

== Production ==
Jon Voight, co-executive producer for the first film Baby Geniuses, hinted a sequel in March 1999. The film was announced as part of Crystal Sky and producing partner Voight's development slate in May 2000 with the working title, Baby Geniuses 2: The Return of the Big Kahuna. The film was going to be released on September 2, 2003, but it was delayed until the following year.

== Reception ==
=== Box office ===
Superbabies: Baby Geniuses 2 opened theatrically on August 27, 2004, in 1,276 venues, earning $3,251,856 in its opening weekend, ranking number eleven in the domestic box office. At the end of its run, on October 3, the film grossed $9,219,388 domestically and $229,256 overseas for a worldwide total of $9,448,644. Having an estimated $20 million budget, the film was a box office bomb.

=== Critical response ===
On the review aggregator website Rotten Tomatoes, 0% of 46 critics' reviews are positive, with an average rating of 2.5/10. The website's consensus reads: "A startling lack of taste pervades Superbabies, a sequel offering further proof that bad jokes still aren't funny when coming from the mouths of babes." Metacritic, which uses a weighted average, assigned the film a score of 9 out of 100, based on 19 critics, indicating "overwhelming dislike". Audiences polled by CinemaScore gave the film an average grade of "B−" on an A+ to F scale, the same grade earned by its predecessor.

Dave Kehr, in his New York Times review, said that the film was "not so much Look Who's Talking as Look Who's Walloping", and noted that the problem with the villain's "plan is that it is already in effect and endorsed by the FCC. It is called commercials." Writing for The Washington Post, Michael O'Sullivan stated, "The action sequences are phony-looking; the dialogue sounds largely improvised on the fly; the laughs are few and far between; and the acting ... is, to put it kindly, wooden."

=== Accolades ===
Award	Category	Subject	Result
Golden Raspberry Award	Worst Supporting Actor	Jon Voight	Nominated
Golden Raspberry Award	Worst Screenplay	Gregory Poppen	Nominated
Golden Raspberry Award	Worst Picture	Steven Paul	Nominated
Golden Raspberry Award	Worst Director	Bob Clark	Nominated
Stinkers Bad Movie Awards	Worst Picture	Steven Paul	Nominated
Stinkers Bad Movie Awards	Most Painfully Unfunny Comedy	Steven Paul	Nominated
Stinkers Bad Movie Awards	Worst Sequel	Steven Paul	Nominated
Stinkers Bad Movie Awards	Worst Director	Bob Clark	Nominated
Stinkers Bad Movie Awards	Worst Screenplay	Gregory Poppen	Nominated
Stinkers Bad Movie Awards	Worst Supporting Actor	Jon Voight	Nominated
Stinkers Bad Movie Awards	Worst Fake Accent – Male	Jon Voight	Nominated
Stinkers Bad Movie Awards	Least "Special" Special Effects		Nominated

== Home media ==
The film was released on DVD and VHS on January 4, 2005.

== See also ==
- List of 21st-century films considered the worst
- List of films with a 0% rating on Rotten Tomatoes
