= The Double 0 Kid =

- VHS cover
- Directed by: Dee McLachlan (Note: Credited as Duncan McLachlan)
- Written by: Steven Paul; Stuart Paul; Andrea Buck; Dee McLachlan
- Produced by: Steven Paul
- Starring: Brigitte Nielsen; Corey Haim; Nicole Eggert; John Rhys-Davies
- Cinematography: Adam Kane
- Edited by: Jack Tucker
- Music by: Misha Segal
- Production company: Crystal Sky
- Distributed by: Prism Pictures
- Release date: 1993
- Running time: 95 minutes
- Country: United States
- Language: English

The Double 0 Kid is a 1993 direct-to-video adventure/comedy film starring Brigitte Nielsen.

== Plot summary ==
17-year-old Lance Elliot is a summer intern at a US government department known as the Agency, on a youth agent scouting internship promotional program ran by Agency department head Maggie Lomax. Living with his single mother and his younger juvenile brother Billy in Philadelphia, Pennsylvania, while aspiring to become a secret agent spy, Lance at heart is an everyday teenage high school boy, who is also seeking to make the most of his summer vacation in his quiet and peaceful if uneventful hometown, and can't wait for his 18th birthday for his independence. At the same time, madman millionaire computer virus designer, Cashpot, and his icy henchwoman Rhonda, seek to complete a virus wanted by various global corporate interests after stealing away the $12,000,000 project from rival underworld designer Rudy von Kessenbaum by cruelly disposing of him in his "video game of doom" room.

Lance's fantasies of espionage and intrigue turn real when he's secretly ordered to rush a package to L.A. by his superior Trout containing confidential information to an allied corporation, Weinburg Micronics, and CEO Sam Weinburg. At the same time, Rhonda and henchman Luther enter into Weinburg Micronics under the guise of a nun and a priest to ask for charity donations, to forcefully cocere Sam to hand over a crucially desired keycard. What would be a quick and pleasant trip to sidetrack Lance's boredom soon becomes serious, as after Lance completes his delivery, Rhonda and Luther assassinates Sam Weinburg and his secretary when they refuse to hand over the keycard and chase after him realizing Lance has it in his possession. Now on the run, Lance hides out, missing his plane home, and sends a fax via payphone and a transcriber to Trout detailing the events that have transpired.

Making a stay at Roosevelt Hotel, Lance cannot catch a break even to rest, as Cashpot's henchmen track him down to his room. Nearly escaping death by climbing back into his hotel room by window after a nasty scuffle, Lance manages to knockout both henchmen and steal back both the keycard and their car via valet parking, before escaping in Rhonda's limo and spending the night at the roof of a carpark. The next morning, the limo is then made unusable by a kid managing to hijack the wheels off the vehicle, but Lance is able to find $13,000 to supplement his stay in L.A., and a note in the money bag for Rhonda's henchmen to meet with another accomplice after completing their mission. Nevertheless, Lance's chase begins again when Rhonda tracks down the limo via satellite and hires out an extreme sports gang in street hockey gear to gang up and steal back the keycard from Lance. Not even making it out of the carpark on the first floor, Lance crashes into Melinda Blake, a like-hearted teenage girl, and inadvertently drags her into his misadventures. Upon being cornered in a back alley, Lance fashions a makeshift flamethrower via sucking fuel canisters out with a Super Soaker to keep them at bay, and both manage to escape upon hitching a ride on a cargo truck.

Upon making their getaway, Lance makes a proper introduction and explains (some) about himself to Melinda, who soon warms up to him as a friend, and spend their afternoon in downtown L.A.. Making a quick trip back to Melinda's home and buying new clothes to blend in, Lance with Melinda then head over to the Los Angeles Zoo to follow the instructions on the note. Heading to the chimpanzee exhibit, and looking for suspicious individuals, a dead man on the bench immediately warns Lance and Melinda that Rhonda's henchmen have already gotten to the zoo. Soon being chased by another mysterious man, Lance ambushes him, and uncovers him to be Trout, who has tracked Lance down to take him back home. Not long after, Rhonda's henchmen soon spot them, and Lance and Melinda give chase by deliberately going through an alligator exhibit to escape their pursuers, while Trout feigns being an undercover policeman by the name of Shamus McGillacutty to stall them. Running to another limo, Lance and Melinda believe they are safe. Lance then gives full disclosure of his situation to Melinda, and both romantically kiss in reconciliation. However, Lance discovers immediately that the driver is none other than Rhonda herself, and both he and Melinda are shot with tranquilizer darts.

As Cashpot nears completion of his virus project, Lance and Melinda are summoned to his base of operations at his mansion on the outskirts of L.A.. In his main computer room, Cashpot reveals his evil plan: The keycard that they have been seeking is in fact a high security level computer network access card, being needed to ensure the transmission of the virus successfully, and is key to their plot to destroy the environment. Upon installation, the virus will act on the systems of an airplane carrying the world's foremost scientists and experts on environmental sciences and awareness enroute to Brazil, to ensure his employers will have undisturbed access to all of the Amazon rainforest's resources.

Finishing his diabolical ravings, Cashpot separates and sends away Lance to his "video-game-of-doom" room, while Melinda is sent back to the shed cellar they were initially kept in. Lance is strapped in to play Cashpot's Pyramid II: Doom Tomb, where he must guide mummy Valfratutut through a dangerous series of trap riddled tunnels to make it to Tutanakhamun's tomb without getting him (and the player themselves) hurt. Nearly getting maimed by pendulum axes, impaled upon a closing spiked ceiling, and poison gassed to death in unfairly programmed scenarios, he is saved by Melinda, who escaped from her confines and being forced upon by Cashpot's more lustful henchman. As Cashpot begins his setup, Lance's escape soon proves to be an immense distraction, and eventually, troops summoned by Trout immediately rush in to make the transmission of the virus harder to complete by the increasing pressure of what's going on and the hesitance of his clientele. Realizing they were safer than anywhere else in the mansion, Lance and Melinda soon hole up in the "video-game-of-doom" room as the shootouts begin to flare up outside. Through a regular computer and triggering the traps around it, Lance boots up a Chess game and issues Cashpot as the challenger, gaining access to his computer room. With the Chess game's programming, Lance outplays Cashpot, and reroutes the virus to infect his main computer, ensuring his plans are foiled.

As the troops close in further onto Cashpot's estate, Cashpot and his clientele soon rush to his helicopter, and to ensure he will have his money, feigns a bomb scare to escape solely with Rhonda. Before Trout and his party can arrest them, Cashpot and Rhonda take off, seeking to take refuge in Monaco. As Trout begins to search for Lance and Melinda, he unknowingly makes it to the main computer room, where the Chess game program is still running. Trout is able to see with the security cameras that Lance and Melinda are safe as they make out in victory, and tries to use the intercom system to let them know of his presence, but as the Chess game intersperses on the monitors, and with his bewilderment and confusion, he unwittingly transmits the virus to Cashpot's helicopter, which presumably kills Cashpot and Rhonda by the virus hijacking their controls and crashing their vehicle.

With Cashpot's clientele and surviving and remaining henchmen rounded up and arrested, Trout finally finds out where Lance and Melinda have headed off to with the estate's security system. Having made it out of Cashpot's estate, Lance and Melinda romantically embrace and walk off into the horizon of Los Angeles, as the Chess game displays a game over screen and fades to black.

== Cast ==
- Brigitte Nielsen as Rhonda
- Corey Haim as Lance Elliot
- Wallace Shawn as Cashpot
- Nicole Eggert as Melinda Blake
- John Rhys-Davies as Rudolph ("Rudi") von Kessenbaum
- Basil Hoffman as Trout
- Karen Black as Mrs. Elliot
- Anne Francis as Maggie Lomax
- Seth Green as Chip
- John Birch as Truck Driver
- Leslie Danon as Charlene, French girl
- Patrick M. Wright as Banker
- Bari K. Willerford as Luther
- Jim Alquist as Tyler
- Josh Collier as Billy
- Chuck Hicks as Sam Wynberg
- Steven Paul as Room Service Bellman (uncredited)
- Dianna Miranda as Kissing Girl
- June Christopher as Wynberg's Secretary
