= Eternity (1990 film) =

- Directed by: Steven Paul
- Written by: Jon Voight; Steven Paul; Dorothy Koster Paul
- Produced by: Steven Paul
- Starring: Jon Voight; Armand Assante; Eileen Davidson; Wilford Brimley; Kaye Ballard; Joey Villa
- Cinematography: John Lambert
- Edited by: Michael J. Sheridan; Peter Zinner
- Music by: Michel Legrand
- Distributed by: Paul Entertainment
- Release date: November 20, 1990
- Running time: 110 minutes
- Country: United States
- Language: English

Eternity is a 1990 American drama film directed by Steven Paul and written by Jon Voight with Paul and his mother Dorothy Koster Paul. The theme of the film is reincarnation.

== Plot ==
Voight wars with his brother, played by Armand Assante, over a medieval kingdom. He wakes up and sees everyone in his real life as being reincarnations of the people in his dream. Assante is now an industrialist out to control the media and the US presidency. He attempts to buy out Voight's TV show to silence him.

== Cast ==
- Jon Voight as Edward/James
- Armand Assante as Romi/Sean
- Wilford Brimley as King/Eric
- Eileen Davidson as Dahlia/Valerie
- Frankie Valli as Taxpayer/Guido

== Production ==
Planning for Eternity took place over six years prior to its release, under the working title Avatar. Jon Voight was signed to play the film's lead, marking his return to film after a three year absence. Voight had been working on the film during its planning stage and had co-written the script. Michel Legrand was confirmed as writing the score for Eternity. Filming took place over a seven week period during January and February 1989 in and around Los Angeles. By August 1989 the movie had gone into post production status.

== Release ==
Voight and Paul had initially intended for Eternity to receive a theatrical release in the United States around Thanksgiving or Christmas, but plans for this fell through. Eternity was released direct to home video on November 20, 1990 though Academy Entertainment.

== Reception ==
Roger Taylor of the Casper Star-Tribune panned the film, stating that "The viewers could almost feel embarrassment for the professionals who appeared in it if it weren't for the fact that Jon Voight is given partial credit for the screenplay."
