= Baby Geniuses =

1999 film by Bob Clark

- Theatrical release poster
- Directed by: Bob Clark
- Screenplay by: Bob Clark; Greg Michael
- Story by: Steven Paul; Bob Clark; Francisca Matos; Robert Grasmere
- Produced by: Steven Paul
- Starring: Kathleen Turner; Christopher Lloyd; Kim Cattrall; Peter MacNicol; Ruby Dee
- Cinematography: Stephen M. Katz
- Edited by: Stan Cole
- Music by: Paul Zaza
- Production companies: TriStar Pictures; Crystal Sky Pictures
- Distributed by: Sony Pictures Releasing
- Release date: March 12, 1999
- Running time: 95 minutes
- Country: United States
- Language: English
- Budget: $12 million
- Box office: $36.5 million

Baby Geniuses is a 1999 American family comedy film directed by Bob Clark and written by Clark and Greg Michael, from a story by Clark, Steven Paul, Francisca Matos, and Robert Grasmere. It stars Kathleen Turner, Christopher Lloyd, Kim Cattrall, Peter MacNicol, and Ruby Dee.

The film is the first full-length feature to use computer-generated imagery for the synthesis of human visual speech. 2D warping techniques were used to digitally animate the mouth viseme shapes of the babies which were originally shot with their mouths closed. The viseme shapes were sampled from syllables uttered by the babies on the set.

Baby Geniuses was released by Sony Pictures Releasing on March 12, 1999. The film was almost universally panned by critics, who lambasted its acting, humor, special effects, writing, and directing, but it grossed $36.5 million worldwide against a production budget of $12 million. In 2004, it was followed by a sequel, Superbabies: Baby Geniuses 2, which was a box office bomb, and received even worse critical reviews, receiving a nomination for Worst Picture at the 25th Golden Raspberry Awards.

== Plot ==
Two scientists, Dr. Elena Kinder and Dr. Heep, use genius-baby studies to fund BabyCo's theme park "Joyworld". According to Dr. Kinder's research on toddlers/babies, they are born possessing vast, universal knowledge and speak a secret yet impossible-to-translate pre-language called Babytalk. However, at age 2–3, the knowledge and language are lost as the babies "cross over" by learning how to speak human languages. All babies raised in Dr. Kinder's underground research facility were adopted from the orphanages Babyco supports (as they serve to filter out which babies should or shouldn't be raised under the Kinder Method) and transformed into small geniuses through use of the Kinder Method, and then used in experiments to decipher this secret yet impossible-to-translate language used by the eight baby geniuses.

One mischievous toddler, Sylvester (the only one of her toddlers raised via the use of the superior version of the Kinder Method), nicknamed "Sly", makes repeated attempts to escape Dr. Kinder's research facility. One night, Sylvester goes into a diaper truck and succeeds. The next morning, he is surprised to run into his long-lost normal twin brother, Whit, in a mall playground. Although Sylvester and Whit share a telepathic bond, each has no idea of the other's existence. The guards from Dr. Kinder's research facility capture Whit, mistaking him for Sylvester, and take him back to Dr. Kinder's research facility. Sylvester is taken home by Whit's adopted mother, Robin, who is Dr. Kinder's niece.

Dr. Kinder and the seven other baby geniuses are shocked that Whit and Sylvester switched places at the mall, but Dr. Kinder becomes excited and begins to see this as an opportunity to do a cross-evaluation on the twins. However, when she comes to Dan Bobbin's place, she realizes that Dan can understand babies. After the attempts to retrieve Sylvester fail, Dr. Kinder decides to move the research facility to Liechtenstein, and they have no choice but to make Whit the only normal baby to be raised in this research facility until they can find a possible way to get Sylvester back to her research facility.

The babies at Bobbin's place hypnotize Lenny, the bus driver, to drive to Dr. Kinder's research facility. Once at the research facility, Sylvester goes to the control room to set the robots from the theme park on the lab scientists. When the Bobbins return home, their natural daughter Carrie tells her father that the children are in Dr. Kinder's research facility. At the end of the fight, Dr. Kinder captures Whit and takes him to the helicopter pad on the roof. Robin and Dan chase them to the roof, where Dr. Kinder reveals that she and Robin are not related and that Robin was adopted at age 2. After Dr. Kinder is arrested by the police, Sylvester and Whit come together on the roof to cross over.

Dan and Robin adopt Sylvester. Dan is still curious about the secrets of life, but as the twins have crossed over, they no longer know those secrets. Carrie reveals nothing, just giving her father a sly smile, since adults are never meant to know their secrets.

== Cast ==
- Kathleen Turner as Dr. Elena Kinder
- Christopher Lloyd as Dr. Heep
- Kim Cattrall as Robin Bobbins, Dan's wife and the biological mother of Carrie and adoptive mother of Whit & Sylvester
- Peter MacNicol as Dan Bobbins, the biological father of Carrie and adoptive father of Whit & Sylvester
- Dom DeLuise as Lenny, who is a janitor and sitter for Dan and Robin.
- Kyle Howard as Dickie/Ice Pick, a teenage guru of the group in Dan and Robin's family.
- Ruby Dee as Margo, Dan and Robin's housekeeper.
- Sam McMurray as Goon Bob
- James M. Hanks as Goon Ray
- Kathleen Freeman as Lenny's Noisy Neighbor (uncredited)
- Dan Monahan as Reporter
- Leo, Gerry and Myles Fitzgerald as Sylvester "Sly" & Whit
  - Miko Hughes as voice of Sly and Whit
- Brianna and Brittany McConnell as Lexi
  - Lexi Thomas as voice of Lexi
- Gabrielle and Megan Robbins as Carrie Bobbins
  - Aaron Spann & Scarlett Pomers as voice of Carrie
- Jacob and Zachary Handy as Ducy
  - Seth Adkins as voice of Ducy
- Griffen and Connor Legget as Basil
  - Scotty Leavenworth as voice of Basil
- Amanda & Caitlin Fein as Teddie
  - Ashli Adams as voice of Teddie

== Production ==
Director Bob Clark became involved with the film in 1994 when he met Jon Voight at a play who told Clark of a script his production company, jointly owned by Steven Paul, Crystal Sky Pictures had acquired that centered around intelligent babies. Clark took the script from Voight and expressed to him and Paul that he did not think the premise would work. However Clark changed his mind when Voight and Paul showed him a one minute proof of concept film they had done with some babies sitting around a table in a management meeting like they were executives with their mouths morphed to appear as if they were talking. The script Clark read was a much more fanciful fairy tale concept involving babies in a family discovering a hole that leads them to Baby World, inhabited by infants with only a few adults around. Clark eventually rewrote the script, jettisoning that plot completely in favor of the corporate intrigue angle desiring to go with a more realistic presentation of the concept. Adult actors were tested for the babies' voices, but this idea was quickly rejected with the producers opting for child voice overs.

The film's concept was conceived by producer Steven Paul, who was inspired by a moment in his life when he saw two babies communicating together at a Barneys New York. David Saunders, the then-president of Sony's Triumph Films, wasn't sure that the film could work until he saw the movie Babe, which had similar use of mouth morphing. The studio held auditions for babies in about six cities. Triplet actors Leo, Gerry and Myles Fitzgerald were almost three when they were cast in the dual role of Whit and Sly. Jim Wagner, the film's baby wrangler, noted that the actors "still looked like babies. And with triplets, you can work longer hours than you can with twins." The film was shot for 50 days, wrapping in March 1997.

The film faced numerous delays. It was originally planned to be released around Christmas 1997. Due to the incomplete visual effects, the film was postponed to April 10, 1998, then January 29, 1999, and then ultimately March 12, 1999. Baby Geniuses was one of the final films to be produced under Sony's Triumph Films label before it shuttered in 1997. The film was briefly handed off to Columbia TriStar Home Video for a direct-to-video release, but eventually reverted back to a theatrical release under TriStar Pictures.

== Reception ==
On the review aggregator website Rotten Tomatoes, 2% of 44 critics' reviews are positive, with an average rating of 2.6/10. The website's consensus reads: "Flat direction and actors who look embarrassed to be onscreen make Baby Geniuses worse than the premise suggests." Metacritic, which uses a weighted average, assigned the film a score of 7 out of 100, based on 14 critics, indicating "overwhelming dislike". Audiences polled by CinemaScore gave the film an average grade of "B−" on an A+ to F scale.

Roger Ebert gave the film 1.5 stars out of 4, writing, "Bad films are easy to make, but a film as unpleasant as Baby Geniuses achieves a kind of grandeur. And it proves something I've long suspected: Babies are cute only when they're being babies. When they're presented as miniature adults (on greeting cards, in TV commercials or especially in this movie), there is something so fundamentally wrong that our human instincts cry out in protest."

In a positive review, Dwayne E. Leslie of Box Office Magazine gave the film 3 out of 5 stars. He compared the film to Look Who's Talking, calling it a "step beyond" for its use of computer-animated mouths "instead of using facial gestures to get implied meanings across." The reviewer also labeled the film as "a live action Rugrats cartoon".

=== Box office ===
The film made over $5 million in its opening weekend, and was the 10th highest-grossing PG-rated movie of 1999.

=== Awards and nominations ===
| Award | Category | Subject | Result |
|---|---|---|---|
| Stinkers Bad Movie Awards | Worst Picture | Steven Paul | Nominated |
| Stinkers Bad Movie Awards | Most Painfully Unfunny Comedy | Steven Paul | Nominated |
| Stinkers Bad Movie Awards | Worst Director | Bob Clark | Won |
| Stinkers Bad Movie Awards | Worst Child Performer | Leo, Gerry and Myles Fitzgerald | Nominated |
| Stinkers Bad Movie Awards | Least "Special" Special Effects | | Nominated |

== Sequel and other media ==
Although the film was not received well by critics, its commercial success on home video prompted a sequel, Superbabies: Baby Geniuses 2. Bob Clark returns to direct the sequel. Jon Voight, who was previously co-executive producer for Baby Geniuses, stars in the film as the antagonist, Bill Biscane. With reception much worse than the original, it was a box office bomb and is widely considered among the worst films of all time.

In 2011, an original series based on the films was announced. The series has so far aired in Italy and the Far East. Additionally, the series was released as a set of movies. Baby Geniuses and the Mystery of the Crown Jewels, which features episodes 1–4, was released direct-to-video in 2013. Episodes 5–8, Baby Geniuses and the Treasures of Egypt, came out in 2014, and episodes 9–12, were released as Baby Geniuses and the Space Baby in 2015. The series follow the Baby Squad Investigators, or B.S.I., as they pursue Big Baby (voiced by Christopher Bones), his father Beauregard Burger (Andy Pandini), and the international thief Moriarty (Jon Voight).
