= J.L. Family Ranch =

2016 TV film

- Film poster
- Screenplay by: Harley Peyton; Charles Robert Carner
- Story by: Steven Paul
- Directed by: Charles Robert Carner
- Starring: Jon Voight; Teri Polo; James Caan; Melanie Griffith; Steven Bauer; Grant Bowler; Trevor Donovan
- Music by: Eric Allaman
- Country of origin: United States
- Original language: English

Production
- Producer: Steven Paul
- Cinematography: Kristopher Kimlin
- Editors: David C. Eichhorn; Robert A. Ferretti
- Running time: 85 minutes
- Production company: Crystal Sky Pictures

Original release
- Network: Hallmark Movies & Mysteries
- Release: August 21, 2016

J.L. Family Ranch is a 2016 American Western television film directed by Charles Robert Carner and written by Harley Peyton. It stars Jon Voight, Teri Polo, James Caan, Melanie Griffith, Steven Bauer, Grant Bowler, and Trevor Donovan. It was broadcast on the Hallmark Movies & Mysteries channel on August 21, 2016. It was released in Europe as Texas Blood. It was followed by a sequel JL Family Ranch 2 in 2020.

== Plot ==
Veteran rancher and former sheriff John Landsburg must face federal bureaucracy when an old enemy, Tap Peterson, alleges John does not actually own the family's Texas ranch.

== Cast ==
- Jon Voight as John Landsburg
- Teri Polo as Rebecca Landsburg
- James Caan as Tap Peterson
- Melanie Griffith as Laura Lee Schafer
- Steven Bauer as Hector Arrieta
- Abby Brammell as Regan Landsburg
- Grant Bowler as Sheriff Henry Whitlock
- Trevor Donovan as Brady Landsburg
- Nathan Keyes as Terrence
- Lee Purcell as Mable Ritter
- Skyler Shaye as Lynn Landsburg
- Kevin Lingle as Agent in Charge
- Shane Woodson as Ethan Petersen
- Cory Scott Allen as McCarthy
- Clarke Vesty is Jon Voight's double and appears as a ranch hand

== Production ==
Principal photography on the film began in mid-January 2016 in Kentucky, with Charles Robert Carner directing and Crystal Sky Pictures' Steven Paul producing from a script by Harley Peyton and music by Eric Allaman.
