= Falling in Love Again (1980 film) =

- Directed by: Steven Paul
- Written by: Steven Paul; Ted Allan; Susannah York
- Produced by: Steven Paul
- Starring: Elliott Gould; Susannah York
- Cinematography: Dick Bush; Michael Mileham; Wolfgang Suschitzky
- Music by: Michel Legrand
- Distributed by: The International Picture Show Company
- Release date: November 21, 1980
- Running time: 103 minutes
- Country: United States
- Language: English

Falling in Love Again is a 1980 American romantic comedy film directed by Steven Paul and starring Elliott Gould and Susannah York.

The film also features Michelle Pfeiffer in an early role, playing a younger version of Susannah York's character.

== Plot ==
Harry Lewis grew up in the Bronx, New York with grand ambitions. He married the most beautiful girl in school, Sue, and planned to become an architect.

Years later, Harry and Sue, unhappy now and nostalgic for their past, are living in Los Angeles and running a garment business. An invitation to their high school reunion persuades them to return to their roots, and their lives together are recalled in flashback on the cross-country drive to New York.

== Cast ==
- Elliott Gould as Harry Lewis
- Susannah York as Sue Lewis
- Kaye Ballard as Mrs. Lewis
- Stuart Paul as Pompadour, Young Harry Lewis
- Michelle Pfeiffer as Sue Wellington
- Twink Caplan as Melinda
- John Diehl as "Beaver" (1940's)
- James Dunaway as Man On Street
- Robert Hackman as Mr. Lewis
- Todd Hepler as Alan Childs
- Iren Koster as Piano Player
- Marian McCargo as Mrs. Wellington
- Tony O'Dell as Bobby Lewis
- Bonnie Paul as Hilary Lewis
- Steven Paul as Stan "The Con"
- Herbert Rudley as Mr. Wellington
- Alan Solomon as Max "The Brain"
- Cathy Tolbert as Cheryl Herman
- Terrence Evans as "Beaver"

== Reception ==
The film was a box-office failure. The New York Times' Vincent Canby in his review of Nov. 21, 1980, gave it an entirely negative appraisal, deriding its "witless screenplay."

Elliott Gould later recalled "“It was a very large score, it was overmusical. It was beautiful. Michel Legrand composed it. I thought there was too much of it. It was the first picture of a very, very young director [then 21 year-old Steven Paul, who also co-wrote]. It was alright.”
