= The Musketeer =

2001 film by Peter Hyams

- Theatrical release poster
- Directed by: Peter Hyams
- Written by: Gene Quintano
- Based on: The Three Musketeers by Alexandre Dumas père
- Produced by: Moshe Diamant
- Starring: Catherine Deneuve; Mena Suvari; Stephen Rea; Tim Roth; Justin Chambers
- Cinematography: Peter Hyams
- Edited by: Terry Rawlings
- Music by: David Arnold
- Production companies: MDP Worldwide; Crystal Sky Worldwide
- Distributed by: Universal Pictures (United States); MDP Worldwide (Overseas)
- Release date: September 7, 2001
- Running time: 104 minutes
- Country: United States
- Language: English
- Budget: $36 million
- Box office: $34.6 million

The Musketeer is a 2001 American action–adventure film based on Alexandre Dumas's classic 1844 novel The Three Musketeers, shot and directed by Peter Hyams, and starring Catherine Deneuve, Mena Suvari, Stephen Rea, Tim Roth and Justin Chambers.

The film features Tsui Hark's regular actor Xin-Xin Xiong as a stunt choreographer and performer. Released days before the September 11 attacks, it was moderately successful in North America but did not perform well in other countries, and received largely negative reviews from critics. It is recognized by the department of Gers as the first Musketeers adaptation to incorporate authentic scenery from the real d'Artagnan's home region.

== Plot ==
The young d'Artagnan witnesses the murder of his parents at the hands of Febre, a cruel swordsman in the employ of Cardinal Richelieu. D'Artagnan is nearly killed after using his dead father's sword to attack Febre, who is then left with a permanent scar and the loss of his left eye. The wounded boy is taken in by Planchet, a family friend and former member of the Musketeers, the loyal protectors of Louis XIII.

Fourteen years later, the adult d'Artagnan finds on his arrival in Paris that the musketeers have been disbanded by order of Richelieu, who plots to usurp the king's authority and render him a powerless figurehead. Richelieu is also trying to foment hostility between France, England, and Spain to gain more political power for himself. D'Artagnan convinces two veteran musketeers, Porthos and Aramis, to free the imprisoned head of the musketeers, Captain de Tréville, thus earning their trust.

He takes a room at a Paris boarding house, where he takes a fancy to the chambermaid, Francesca, who is the daughter of the late seamstress to the queen. Febre, on orders from Richelieu, incites a mob to attack the royal palace during a state dinner for Lord Buckingham, a visiting English dignitary. D'Artagnan, with the help of Porthos, Aramis and another musketeer, Athos, saves King Louis, the queen, and Lord Buckingham from being hurt or killed. Afterwards, Francesca recruits d'Artagnan to make a clandestine trip to the north coast of France with the queen to meet with Buckingham in an effort to keep peace between the two countries. However, d'Artagnan's landlord overhears them and tells Febre.

During the trip, d'Artagnan fights off repeated attacks by Febre's henchmen. He and Francesca become intimate, only to have Febre discover them and kidnap her and the queen. Febre forces the queen to write a letter to Buckingham asking him to meet her at a heavily fortified castle of his choosing, using the queen's ring to convince him of the authenticity of the message. Richelieu realizes that the jingoistic Febre intends to incite full-blown war between England and France. Knowing that he has lost control of his chief henchman, his bodyguard, Rochefort, attempts to stop Febre, but is easily cut down and killed. Determined to stop Febre, Richelieu secretly visits d'Artagnan and tells him of Febre's plans and pleads for his help to stop Febre. D'Artagnan agrees, but only because Febre is holding Francesca. D'Artagnan soon learns that his landlord sold him and Francesca out and promises him to kill him should he fail to save Francesca.

D'Artagnan returns to Paris and convinces the surviving musketeers that their responsibility to the crown remains their highest priority, and they join him at the castle where Francesca, the queen, and Lord Buckingham are being held. They charge the castle on horseback, losing several of their number in the process, but the diversion they create allows Planchet to drive his carriage in front of the castle gates below the field of enemy cannon fire. This enables him to fire a concealed mortar and create an opening.

The remaining musketeers easily deal with Febre's men, while d'Artagnan engages Febre himself in an intense duel, finally killing him and avenging the death of his parents. D'Artagnan and the three surviving musketeers are given medals for their service, and d'Artagnan covertly threatens Richelieu. At the end, d'Artagnan and Francesca are seen to be married.

== Cast ==
- Justin Chambers as d'Artagnan
- Tim Roth as Febre, the Man in Black
- Stephen Rea as Cardinal Richelieu
- Mena Suvari as Francesca Bonacieux
- Catherine Deneuve as The Queen
- Daniel Mesguich as King Louis XIII
- Jean-Pierre Castaldi as Planchet
- Nick Moran as Aramis
- Steve Speirs as Porthos
- Jan-Gregor Kremp as Athos
- Michael Byrne as Tréville, Head of the Musketeers
- David Schofield as Rochefort, Richelieu Henchman
- Jeremy Clyde as Duke of Buckingham
- Bill Treacher as Mr Bonacieux
- Tsilla Chelton as Madame Lacross

== Differences from the novel and other adaptations ==
The film is a broad reimagining of Dumas' work, which deemphasizes political machinations in favor of a revenge plot typical of modern action films. A new antagonist, Febre, who has psychopathic traits, takes precedence over the book's historical figures. Febre's portrayal as a one-eyed man in black bears strong similarities to that of Rochefort in the Walt Disney adaptation. The character's eyepatch actually dates all the way back to the 1973 film. In the book, he only has a scar. Also similar to the 1993 film, d'Artagnan's father was a former musketeer and was murdered—this time alongside his wife—by the man in black. In this version however, the parents' murder is a gratuitous crime to which a young d'Artagnan bears witness. It is not part of Richelieu's conspiracy and neither Athos, Porthos nor Aramis, who have greatly reduced roles throughout, are aware of it. In the novel, d'Artagnan leaves his father in good health. The senior d'Artagnan was never a musketeer, but his son is encouraged to enlist due the family's noble Gascon background, which it shares with many members of the guard.

The character of Planchet is not a mere servant d'Artagnan hires in Paris, but a sidekick and mentor to the d'Artagnan family, who raises the boy after his parents' death and arms himself with concealed pistols. Whereas d'Artagnan romances several women at once in the novel, the film's version is inexperienced with the ladies. Constance Bonacieux, his older love interest, is replaced with Francesca Bonacieux, a younger and more upbeat figure. She is the daughter of a Spanish seamstress who followed Infanta Anne to France when she married Louis XIII. Rather than being married to d'Artagnan's landlord, she is his niece, although the older man tries to extort sexual favors from her.

Early in the film the Musketeers are framed for the murder of a Spanish envoy and disbanded, which too is broadly similar to the 1993 version. In the book, the Musketeers have frequent skirmishes with Richelieu's guards, but they are still in activity. The novel's court intrigues have been simplified. While the Queen has a volatile relationship with Louis XIII, Lord Buckingham is not her lover and the diamond studs subplot is absent, as is Richelieu's spy Milady De Winter. The Cardinal's scheme is more straightforward and entails the staging of public incidents that will sap the King's credibility. Rochefort is an elegant character who seems to obey Richelieu out of deference for his political stature, rather than outright malevolence. Perhaps due to the invention of Febre, Rochefort's rivalry with d'Artagnan in The Musketeer remains gentlemanly. It is somewhat truer to the book than his outright villainous portrayal in many other adaptations, even though he meets a different end. Both Richelieu and Rochefort are blindsided by Febre's ruthlessness and by his direct attack on the Queen.

== Production ==
=== Development ===
Gene Quintano sold the film's script to Moshe Diamant, a producer at Mark Damon's Vision International, in 1992 for $750,000. Quintano aspired to direct the project, then titled D'Artagnan, himself. It was one of several Three Musketeers adaptations in the works at the time: others were being pitched at Columbia (by Damon's former Vision associate Jon Peters), Disney and Tri-Star. Eventually, the attention received by Disney's film put a damper on rival projects. Quintano's version was put on hold, and would later be revived at Vision's successor company, MDP (Mark Damon Productions) Worldwide.

The project resurfaced in the press in the spring of 2000, with Peter Hyams—who had helmed two films starring Diamant's usual leading man Jean-Claude Van Damme—now directing. The swashbuckling tale's wire fu makeover was Diamant's idea too, as he had previously worked with Xin-Xin Xiong on Tsui Hark's two Van Damme vehicles, Double Team and Knock Off. Early coverage named Mena Suvari as the lead actress, but also mentioned Gary Oldman—who had previously been approached for the 1993 version—as a prospective co-star. Michael Lonsdale was in talks to appear as well. Ultimately the latter two did not participate. Catherine Deneuve was in negotiations to star for several months, but only signed on shortly before filming.

The film was originally announced under the banner of Behaviour Communications, the film branch of a Canadian multimedia conglomerate, into which Mark Damon had merged his company MDP Worldwide in 1998. But after another restructuring, the company changed its name back to MDP Worldwide in May 2000. The film was an international co-production between the United States, the United Kingdom, Germany and Luxembourg. It was part of a trio of films co-produced by MDP/Behaviour, Luxembourg's Carousel Picture Company and German tax shelter fund AppolloMedia. The others were FeardotCom and Extreme Ops, the second of which Quintano helped write.

While based on a French work, the film did not get any subsidies from France's national film support fund, as it was viewed as a commercially oriented production. It did, however, receive some from the regional governments whose territories were showcased in the picture. Despite interest from the local population, casting agents struggled to find suitable extras to portray a bygone peasantry, as most modern inhabitants of rural Southern France lacked the rough facial features desired by production, and looked too urban.

=== Filming ===
Shooting commenced on 17 August 2000, and took place in Luxembourg, Belgium and France. The streets of 17th century Paris were recreated in Sarlat-la-Canéda. The Dordogne town claims to be the 3rd most requested filming location in France after Paris and Nice, as its well preserved architecture makes it highly sought after for historical films. Another Dordogne locality, Monpazier, stood in for downtown Brionne. Sarlat and a castle on the outskirts of Monpazier figure in another revisionist take on Dumas, Revenge of the Musketeers.

The Cité de Carcassonne provided some wide shots of the French capital's now demolished fortifications. Some specific Paris locations were based on buildings in Toulouse: the Royal Palace is the redecorated Capitole, while Richelieu's residence is the Convent of the Jacobins. The Toulouse part of the shoot was briefly disturbed by a dispute between local extras and Auzielle-based Capitole Productions, who had hired them on behalf of the film's main producers. At least one scene was cancelled as a result.

The production also incorporated locations from Gascony, the actual region where d'Artagnan grew up, although they do not necessarily represent their real-life counterparts in narration. Among the more notable are Château de Cassaigne, which is used as the domain where the Queen seeks shelter after escaping from Paris, and Château de Caumont in Cazaux-Savès, which stands in for the Musketeers' headquarters at Monsieur de Tréville's. During filming in the area, Hyams, Diamant, Chambers and Castaldi attended a ceremony at Cathédrale Saint-Pierre de Condom where they were made honorary "musketeers", although this was not a military function, and rather a banquet organized by a cultural association only loosely related to the old Musketeers of the Guard.

Vianden Castle in Luxembourg became the fictional Duchamps Castle, where the film's climactic action scene takes place. Vianden's mayor was apparently displeased with damage the castle suffered during filming. In addition to choreographing the fight scenes, Xin-Xin Xiong was Tim Roth's stunt double.

== Pre-release ==
=== Distribution ===
The film was shown at the American Film Market in the form of a sizzle reel in March 2001. It was successful with foreign buyers, but faced a tentative domestic market towards large independent productions. Hyams finished assembling his first print in mid-April 2001. The same month, MDP entered final negotiations with Universal and Miramax, who teamed up to buy the film's North American and U.K. rights for $7.5 million. Universal would release it in North America, and Miramax in the United Kingdom. Around the same time, the film's English-language version was renamed The Musketeer. It retained its intended title in select foreign territories, such as France.

=== Promotion ===
The Musketeer held its world premiere in Los Angeles on 5 September 2001. The film was selected for the 27th Deauville Festival, where it held its European premiere out of competition on 7 September 2001. The launch trailer started with a condensed preview of the film's tavern fight, exempt of any dialogue or voice-over, and later proclaimed "This fall, Alexandre Dumas' classic is completely reimagined with fight choreography by Hong Kong legend Xin-Xin Xiong." None of the director and stars' names were mentioned. Industry professionals saw the promotional focus on martial arts and the trailer's extensive rotation ahead of Universal's teen comedy American Pie 2 as the main factors behind the film's relatively successful launch. IGN felt that Universal's hyping of Xiong as a "legend" was exaggerated, as his style owed much to some of his forebears like Yuen Woo-ping.

== Release ==
=== Box office ===
Upon release, trade publication Variety projected that the film would perform respectably in U.S. theaters, but would find more favor in international markets. The Los Angeles Times thought otherwise, suggesting that the film's independent producers would find it hard to break even internationally after selling the U.S. rights for a modest amount.

The film debuted with a $10.7 million opening ahead of Two Can Play That Game; it was the number-one film in the country in the weekend before the 9/11 terror attacks. It was the number-one film at the box office the day of the attacks. In its second weekend the film made $5.3 million. The decrease was not necessarily due to the terror attacks, as overall box office intake was actually higher year-on-year. The Musketeer went on grossing $27 million in Canada and the United States.

Internationally, The Musketeer struggled, sometimes for reasons beyond the film itself. In France, the country of top billed Catherine Deneuve, it opened on a modest 341 screens for a career tally of 228,037 admissions. In Germany, which contributed much of the film's budget, theatrical release was compromised by a falling out between distribution partners Helkon and Buena Vista, and eventually cancelled in favor of a home video premiere nearly two years after its U.S. debut. The film is credited with a non-domestic gross of just $7 million for a combined worldwide gross of $34 million, against its $36 million production budget.

Nonetheless, sales of the film's rights, combined with efficient tax optimization, made The Musketeer a positive venture according to MDP, contributing $27 million to the company's revenue and helping it back in the black after several difficult years. Universal also called the film "a very successful acquisition". Xiong would work for Diamant on a few more international films after The Musketeer.

=== Home media ===
The film was released on DVD on 26 February 2002. It reached number 4 in Billboard's national DVD sales chart. In Germany, distributor MC One issued a limited and numbered 2-DVD Digipak special edition with a hologram cover and 24-page booklet.

== Reception ==
On Rotten Tomatoes, the film has an approval rating of 11% based on 96 reviews, with an average rating of 3.5/10. The website's consensus states that "Hong Kong inspired action sequences take center stage in this latest Three Musketeers adaptation. Unfortunately, the oversimplification of the story and an uncharismatic lead character leave the movie flat." Metacritic, which uses a weighted average, assigned the film a score of 27 out of 100, based on 23 critics, indicating "generally unfavorable" reviews.

The Musketeer received similar criticism to the 1993 version, to which it is most often compared, with many feeling that the integrity of the source material had been compromised in an effort to cater to a younger, casual audience. The Chicago Tribune's Michael Wilmington called it "even worse" than that film, and made for people "who think that D'Artagnan is a men's cologne". Stephen Holden of The New York Times argued that "The Musketeer conflicts with itself by trying to blend grand old-school costume drama and MTV-style rhythm and attitude in the same movie." Quintano's mix of modern and classic phrasing was criticized as an "awkward melange" by Boxoffice, while IGN said that it "can't make up its mind at to be either somewhat Shakespearean sounding or emulating modern vernacular." The teen romance between d'Artagnan and Francesca was equally poorly received: The Washington Post's Michael O'Sullivan equated it to "a child's idea of romantic love".

Boxoffice Magazine did not object to the story's reimagining, judging it "less disgraceful" than Disney's film and 1998's The Man in the Iron Mask, but contended that Hyams and editor Terry Rawlings were out of touch with the requirements of Hong Kong choreography in terms of coverage and clarity. Some scenes, like the ladder fight, were also criticized for their similarities to Xiong's past work. While Roger Ebert said that he "can not in strict accuracy recommend this film", he conceded that "the action scenes are wonders to behold". The Los Angeles Times' Kevin Thomas, an exponent of popular action cinema, called the film "robust and handsome".

The Musketeer's art direction was praised, with Boxoffice touting "lavish production values" and Ebert calling the banquet scene "a marvel of art design". The film also earned notice for its photography relying primarily on natural light, which Thomas and the Houston Chronicle's Louis B. Parks compared to a painting. However, like many of Hyams' previous works, some found it too dark.

Justin Chambers' interpretation of d'Artagnan elicited particular disdain, with several reviewers comparing it to soap opera acting. Many found Catherine Deneuve wasted as Queen Anne, with Hollywood.com calling her "completely underused". Despite some pushback over his character's unnecessary inclusion, a number of reviewers singled out Tim Roth's unhinged performance as Febre as the most enjoyable aspect of the film. Ebert remarked that "when Tim Roth vows vengeance on the man who blinded him, I for one believe him." The more modern characterization of Planchet and his portrayal by Jean-Pierre Castaldi also received praise, with the Chicago Tribune calling him "a ton of fun".

A few critics have defended the film's action focus, arguing that it could be seen as an evolution of the acrobatics seen in Douglas Fairbanks' 1921 and 1929 films. In a retrospective review, genre film website The Action Elite deemed that the film was "not that memorable" but "arguably [had] the best action scenes of any incarnation of these characters, making it a fun ride." The Musketeer has drawn some—mostly unfavorable—comparisons to Brotherhood of the Wolf, a contemporary Universal release that mixed romanticized European history and Asian martial arts. Both films were shot in close locations, with some actors, local extras and crew members taking part in both films.

The Musketeer: Original Motion Picture Soundtrack

Soundtrack album by David Arnold
- Released: September 11, 2001
- Genre: Orchestral
- Length: 49:39
- Label: Decca Records

== Soundtrack ==
The film's score was composed and produced by David Arnold, and conducted and arranged by frequent collaborator Nicholas Dodd. It was released on CD by the Decca Records, a Universal Music subsidiary, on 11 September 2001. The soundtrack has been a fixture of Universal Studios Florida and could frequently be heard in the park's entrance.
