= Big Stan =

- Promotional poster
- Directed by: Rob Schneider
- Written by: Josh Lieb
- Produced by: John Schneider; Mark A.Z. Dippé; Rob Schneider; David Hillary; Timothy Wayne Peternel
- Starring: Rob Schneider; Jennifer Morrison; Scott Wilson; Henry Gibson; Richard Kind; Sally Kirkland; Jackson Rathbone; M. Emmet Walsh; David Carradine
- Cinematography: Victor Hammer
- Edited by: Richard Halsey
- Music by: John Hunter; John Debney (themes)
- Production companies: Crystal Sky Pictures; Silver Nitrate; From Out of Nowhere Productions
- Distributed by: Sony Pictures Home Entertainment
- Release dates: November 5, 2007 (KBS Premiere Pictures Festival); March 24, 2009 (United States)
- Running time: 105 minutes
- Country: United States
- Language: English
- Budget: $7.5 million
- Box office: $8.7 million

Big Stan is a 2007 American martial arts prison comedy film starring, produced, and directed by Rob Schneider in his directorial debut with help from his company From Out of Nowhere Productions. The rest of the cast includes Jennifer Morrison, Scott Wilson, Henry Gibson, Richard Kind, Sally Kirkland, Jackson Rathbone, M. Emmet Walsh, Dan Haggerty, and David Carradine. It tells the story of a real estate con artist who gets sentenced to three years in prison and spends the six months beforehand getting trained by a martial arts guru to survive in prison. This film was Gibson's final role before his death in 2009 (the year in which Carradine also died).

Although released in some markets during the fall of 2008, it was released straight to DVD in the United States on March 24, 2009. It debuted at number 17 on the DVD rental charts of March 23–30, 2009.

== Plot ==
Stan Minton is a wealthy real estate con artist who is married to Mindy. One day, he is arrested for conning elderly people out of their savings. His lawyer Mal defends him at the trial presided over by Judge Perry. The jury's forewoman reads the guilty verdict and the sentencing will be the following day.

While talking with Stan, Mal refuses to bribe Judge Perry since he does not practice that kind of law and tells Stan that any shyster on the street would do it for him. Inspired by the bench advertisement outside, Stan fires Mal from the case and hires Lew Popper as a replacement for the sentencing. Judge Perry sentences Stan to three years at the Verlaine Correctional Facility, while giving him six months to reorganize the charity that he had established to teach music to mentally disabled children.

As he cannot go on a permanent vacation to Brazil on Lew's advice due to his assets being frozen, Stan gets drunk and visits a biker bar where he has the fear of jailhouse rape instilled in him by a biker ex-con that strains his marriage to Mindy. Stan decides to learn self defence to protect himself against other inmates, and initially fails to learn at a dojo run by Master Cho. Stan is approached by a mysterious guru known as The Master who helps transform him into a martial arts expert. He passes every training and bests Master Cho. Upon Lew telling him that he has been reassigned to Oaksburg Correctional Facility, Stan gets himself processed for prison with the Master and Lew seeing him off. A tearful Mindy watches from afar.

During his imprisonment, Stan befriends an elderly inmate named Larry who is serving a life sentence for murdering his partner. Stan also encounters a sympathetic prison guard named Bullard and learns more about the cliques and gang activities inside the prison. He then uses his new-found skills to bring peace and harmony to the prison yard by intimidating his fellow inmates like Big Raymond into preventing them from harming each other. With this, peace is restored in Oaksburg and Stan gains their respect, eventually becoming their leader.

However, the corrupt prison warden Gasque has plans to force the prison's closure with a riot and sell off the property. While also encountering another student of the Master's named Dang, Stan helps Gasque with the real estate aspects in exchange for early parole. However, his peacemaking efforts threaten Warden Gasque's plan for a riot and he is persuaded to bring back violence.

In a last minute attack of conscience, he deliberately blows the parole hearing to rush back to the prison. He defeats Dang in combat, and prevents the deaths of his fellow inmates, only to discover that his message of peace has sunk in and the prisoners are dancing instead of fighting. Warden Gasque orders the guards to open fire on the dancing men. When they refuse, he grabs a gun in front of the board of governors and shoots outrageously. Warden Gasque attempts to shoot Stan, but he is stopped by Mindy and the Master who had snuck in. Stan was surprised to learn that the Master had trained Mindy during his incarceration when he thought they were having an affair during an earlier conjugal.

Three years later, Stan is on his final day in prison where Bullard has been sworn in as the new warden. The inmates welcome the new arrival, Lew, who was disbarred after he had foreseen that he would be arrested for having slept with a member of the jury. The "No Rape" law is still in action. Gasque becomes the new inmate following his arrest for his illegal activities as Big Raymond intimidates him to say goodbye to Stan. Stan is met by his wife, his young daughter Mindy Jr, and the Master outside the prison, who has become Mindy Jr.'s nanny. Happily, they drive off into the sunset with the Master winking towards the viewers.

== Cast ==
- Rob Schneider as "Big" Stan Minton, a rich real estate con artist
- Jennifer Morrison as Mindy Minton, Stan's wife
- Scott Wilson as Francis Gasque, a corrupt prison warden of Oaksburg State Correctional Facility who seeks to get the prison closed down so he can sell the land
- Henry Gibson as Larry / "Shorts", an inmate befriended by Stan who is serving a life sentence for killing his partner
- Richard Kind as Mal, Stan and Mindy's lawyer
- Sally Kirkland as Madame Foreman, a jury member who finds Stan guilty at his trial
- Jackson Rathbone as Robbie, a hippie inmate and former drug dealer
- M. Emmet Walsh as Lew Popper, a shyster whom Stan replaces with Mal during his trial
- David Carradine as The Master, a martial arts guru who trains Stan to survive prison
- Marcia Wallace as Alma
- Randy Couture as Carnahan
- Brandon T. Jackson as Deshawn, an inmate
- Richard Riehle as Judge Perry, a judge who presides over Stan's trial
- Kevin Gage as Bullard, a sympathetic prison guard
- Bob Sapp as Big Raymond, a tough inmate
- Tsuyoshi Abe as Dang, a Vietnamese Mafia member and one of the Master's students who is loyal to Gasque
- Salvator Xuereb as Patterson, the leader of the Nazi Prison Gang
- Dan Haggerty as a gay ex-con

Rob Schneider's mother Pilar cameos as one of the board of governors. Wes Takahashi, former animator and visual effects supervisor for Industrial Light & Magic, makes a cameo appearance as a bartender.

== Reception ==
On Rotten Tomatoes the film has an approval rating of 11% based on reviews from nine critics (one positive, eight negative), with an average rating of 3.00/10.

Julie Rigg of the Australian Broadcasting Corporation was highly critical of the rape-based humor, and concluded "I wasted two valuable hours of my life on Big Stan—don't make the same mistake." Writing for The Sydney Morning Herald, Paul Byrnes asked "If there's been a clumsier, dumber, more casually put together collection of badly timed gags, racial stereotypes and lazy performances this year, I have yet to see it... How could [Schneider] be in so many movies over a 20-year career and learn so little about making a movie?" Brian Orndorf of DVD Talk called it "a forgettable, unfunny waste of time". He criticized the "unrelenting" repetition of rape jokes, but believed that Schneider acted the character's fear of rape convincingly. Despite this, he concluded that the film's 'failure to find even the slightest punchline deviation is depressing'.

MovieHole rated it 3.5 out of 5 and called it Schneider's best film since The Hot Chick.
