= Triumph Films =

Defunct film producer and distributor

- Final logo used from 1994 to 2014
- Formerly: Triumph Releasing Corporation (1988–1994)
- Type: In-name-only division
- Industry: Film
- Predecessor: SVS Films (first relaunch)
- Founded: 1982; 44 years ago (original); 1988; 38 years ago (first relaunch); 2003; 23 years ago (second relaunch); 2014; 12 years ago (third relaunch)
- Defunct: 1985; 41 years ago (original); 1997; 29 years ago (first relaunch); 2008; 18 years ago (second relaunch); 2014; 12 years ago (third relaunch)
- Fate: Dormant
- Successor: Studios: Sony Pictures Classics; Destination Films; Screen Gems; Stage 6 Films; Library: Sony Pictures Entertainment (with some exceptions)
- Headquarters: 10202 West Washington Boulevard, Culver City, California, United States
- Key people: Samuel White (Co-president); Benjamin Lewis (executive chairman)
- Products: Motion pictures
- Parent: Columbia Pictures (1982–1985); Gaumont (1982–1985); Sony Pictures Entertainment (1988–2014)

Triumph Films (also known as Triumph Releasing Corporation) was an American independent film studio division of Sony Pictures Entertainment, that geared towards theatre and direct-to-video film production and distribution.

== History ==
It was founded in 1982 as a joint venture between Columbia Pictures and the French company Gaumont to distribute foreign films in the US. In 1984, Marcie Bloom, who was formerly of the New York Film Festival, joined Triumph Films to serve as New York publicity director (Bloom would later co-found Sony Pictures Classics).

In 1985, Triumph Films announced that they would cut back down on their production slate, focusing on foreign-language films with English subtitles. Shortly afterwards, Gaumont decided to cut ties, and Columbia Pictures, now the sole owner, decided to shutter Triumph Films, and fold it into the Columbia Pictures label. The arthouse functions were later taken by Sony Pictures Classics in 1992.

On January 5, 1988, the then-newly founded Columbia Pictures Entertainment announced that they would revive the Triumph brand as a new worldwide subsidiary, Triumph Releasing Corporation; this incarnation of Triumph provided administrative services related to the distribution of Columbia Pictures and Tri-Star Pictures in the U.S. and Canada, while internationally, Triumph would be responsible for the sales, marketing and distribution of Columbia and Tri-Star films under the direction of each individual studio. It was officially incorporated on March 24, 1988.

In 1989, Triumph began to distribute films from Crédit Lyonnais's Epic Productions Inc. under a theatrical distribution agreement. The company also started distributing films from 21st Century Film Corporation and SVS Films (owned by Sony) around the time, the latter after Sony acquired Columbia Pictures Entertainment.

In 1991, when SVS was reorganized, SVS Films was absorbed as the production branch of Triumph Releasing Corporation, while the home video unit of SVS was reorganized as SVS/Triumph before the home video unit shuttered.

In March 1992, David Saunders, who was business partner with Zalman King, and former president of The Guber-Peters Entertainment Company, became president of Triumph Releasing Corporation, which transferred from distributing films by Epic Productions and Vision International to focus itself on low-budget productions. In 1994, the company entered into a pact with Crystal Sky Pictures for production of two low-budget family feature films.

On November 23, 1994, Triumph Releasing Corporation was renamed as Sony Pictures Releasing Corporation, and the Triumph name was spun off at film production as Triumph Films, now primarily a label for low-budget and direct-to-video releases.

The company shuttered in 1997, as many of these films made under the Triumph name were flopped at the box office, and also as part of a cost-cutting measure by Sony Pictures Entertainment's new president, John Calley, and many of Triumph's finished films like In God's Hands and Baby Geniuses was transferred to TriStar Pictures. The role as a genre label would later been taken by Screen Gems.

After being shut down in 1997, the Triumph Films label was re-activated in 2003. The label went dormant again in 2008, becoming an in-name-only division of Sony Pictures Releasing Corporation. The company came after the formation of a new entity, Sony Pictures Worldwide Acquisitions. In 2014, the label was revived yet again for the release of The Remaining. Their direct-to-video role has been taken by Destination Films within Sony.

== Notable films ==
Notable films include To Gillian on Her 37th Birthday, The Ambulance, Brainscan, Magic in the Water (co-released by TriStar Pictures), The Golden Laws, Steamboy (co-distributed by Destination Films), the controversial Ghosts Can't Do It, and the critically panned SuperBabies: Baby Geniuses 2.

== 1980s ==
Release date	Title
February 10, 1982	Das Boot
June 21, 1982	La vie continue
June 23, 1982	Bob le flambeur (Note: Owned by StudioCanal)
September 14, 1982	Josepha
October 6, 1982	Yol
January 23, 1983	Parsifal
February 11, 1983	We of the Never Never (Note: Owned by Umbrella Entertainment)
February 16, 1983	That Night in Varennes (Note: Retained by Gaumont)
April 21, 1983	Invitation au voyage
April 29, 1983	Querelle
May 13, 1983	Ready for Love
May 27, 1983	The Trout
September 9, 1983	Moon in the Gutter
September 28, 1983	Danton
November 11, 1983	Purple Haze (Note: Owned by MGM)
December 14, 1983	The Eyes, the Mouth
January 26, 1984	And the Ship Sails On
May 18, 1984	Danny Boy (Note: Owned by Film4 Productions)
May 25, 1984	Heat of Desire
June 12, 1984	Le Dernier Combat (Note: U.S. distribution rights to this film have since been transferred to sister company Sony Pictures Classics, which in turn acquired them from producer Gaumont)
June 21, 1984	After the Rehearsal
September 20, 1984	Carmen
October 13, 1984	À Nos Amours
November 9, 1984	The Little Bunch
November 9, 1984	A Love in Germany
August 2, 1985	Death in a French Garden
August 26, 1985	My Other Husband
October 18, 1985	Acqua e sapone
November 1, 1985	Sotto, sotto
December 8, 1989	Triumph of the Spirit (Note: Rights now belong to Amazon MGM Studios)

== 1990s ==
Release date	Title	Notes
January 12, 1990	Ski Patrol	distribution only; produced by Epic Productions
February 16, 1990	Courage Mountain	distribution only; produced by Epic Productions
March 9, 1990	Bad Influence	distribution only; produced by Epic Productions
April 20, 1990	Modern Love	distribution only; produced by SVS Films
April 20, 1990	Why Me?	distribution only; produced by Epic Productions, Sarlui / Diamant and Carolina Productions
April 27, 1990	Wild Orchid	distribution only; produced by Vision PDG
June 1, 1990	Ghosts Can't Do It	distribution only; produced by Epic Productions
July 20, 1990	Clownhouse	distribution only: produced by Commercial Pictures
August 24, 1990	Men at Work	distribution only; produced by Epic Productions
September 28, 1990	Dark Angel	distribution only; produced by Vision PDG
October 19, 1990	The Ambulance	distribution only; produced by Epic Productions and Esparza / Katz Productions
October 26, 1990	Sonny Boy	distribution only; produced by Trans World Entertainment
November 2, 1990	Waiting for the Light	distribution only; produced by Epic Productions
November 9, 1990	Mister Frost	distribution only; produced by SVS Films
November 21, 1990	Robot Jox	distribution only; produced by Empire Pictures
April 12, 1991	Eminent Domain	distribution only; produced by SVS Films
October 9, 1991	Homicide	U.S. distribution only (Note: Distribution rights now belong to Quiver Distribution)
November 1, 1991	Year of the Gun	
February 28, 1992	Gate 2: The Trespassers	distribution only; produced by Vision PDG
March 27, 1992	Ruby	distribution only; produced by PolyGram Filmed Entertainment
April 15, 1992	Brenda Starr	
May 8, 1992	Wild Orchid II: Two Shades of Blue	distribution only; produced by Vision PDG
August 1, 1992	Jersey Girl	distribution only; produced by Electric Pictures
October 23, 1992	Zebrahead	
March 5, 1993	Shadow of the Wolf	distribution only; produced by Vision PDG
April 9, 1993	Sidekicks	distribution only; produced by Vision PDG and Gallery Films (Note: Distribution rights now belong to Samuel Goldwyn Films)
April 22, 1994	Brainscan	
March 3, 1995	Nina Takes a Lover	
April 12, 1995	Jury Duty	co-production with TriStar Pictures
August 30, 1995	Magic in the Water	co-production with TriStar Pictures
January 26, 1996	Screamers	co-production with Columbia Pictures
August 23, 1996	Solo	
October 18, 1996	To Gillian on Her 37th Birthday	co-production with Rastar
April 14, 1997	Bliss	
May 2, 1997	Truth or Consequences, N.M.	
August 22, 1997	Masterminds	co-production with Columbia Pictures
September 12, 1997	The Disappearance of Garcia Lorca	co-production with Sony Pictures Releasing
September 26, 1997	The Assignment	

== 2000s ==
Release date	Title	Notes
December 5, 2003	The Golden Laws	
August 27, 2004	Superbabies: Baby Geniuses 2	co-production with ApolloMedia, Crystal Sky Pictures and Hador BG2 Productions Ltd.
March 18, 2005	Steamboy	US distribution only; co-distributed by Destination Films, produced by Sunrise and Toho
February 17, 2006	The Second Chance	co-production with Provident Films, Ruckus Film and Cedar Partners
January 2, 2007	Shottas	co-distributed by Destination Films
April 18, 2008	Zombie Strippers	theatrical distribution only; produced by Stage 6 Films

== 2010s ==
Release date	Title	Notes
September 5, 2014	The Remaining	distribution only; produced by Affirm Films; Final film from Triumph Films altogether.
