= Catwoman (film) =

2004 superhero film directed by Pitof

- Theatrical release poster
- Directed by: Pitof
- Screenplay by: John Brancato Michael Ferris; John Rogers
- Story by: Theresa Rebeck; John Brancato; Michael Ferris
- Based on: Catwoman by Bob Kane, Bill Finger & DC Comics
- Produced by: Denise Di Novi; Edward L. McDonnell
- Starring: Halle Berry; Benjamin Bratt; Lambert Wilson; Frances Conroy; Sharon Stone
- Cinematography: Thierry Arbogast
- Edited by: Sylvie Landra
- Music by: Klaus Badelt
- Production companies: Village Roadshow Pictures; Di Novi Pictures; Frantic Films; Maple Shade Films; Catwoman Films
- Distributed by: Warner Bros. Pictures
- Release dates: July 19, 2004 (Los Angeles); July 23, 2004 (United States)
- Running time: 104 minutes
- Country: United States
- Language: English
- Budget: $100 million
- Box office: $82.4 million

Catwoman is a 2004 American superhero film directed by Pitof and written by John Rogers, John Brancato and Michael Ferris from a story by Theresa Rebeck, Brancato and Ferris, with music by Klaus Badelt. It is loosely based on the DC Comics character Catwoman. The film stars Halle Berry as the title character, along with Benjamin Bratt, Lambert Wilson, Frances Conroy and Sharon Stone.

The film's story centers on Patience Phillips, a meek graphic designer, who discovers a conspiracy within the cosmetics company she works for that involves a dangerous product that could cause widespread health problems. After being discovered and murdered by the conspirators, Patience is revived by an Egyptian Mau cat that grants her cat-like metahuman abilities, allowing her to become the crime-fighting superheroine Catwoman.

Produced by Village Roadshow Pictures and Denise Di Novi's Di Novi Pictures, Catwoman was released in the United States by Warner Bros. Pictures on July 23, 2004. The film was a box-office bomb, grossing $82.4 million worldwide against a budget of $100 million, and was universally panned by critics and audiences alike, with many considering it to be one of the worst films ever made. Additionally, it also received seven Golden Raspberry Award nominations, winning Worst Picture, Worst Director, Worst Actress (Berry), and Worst Screenplay.

== Plot ==
Artist Patience Phillips works for the cosmetics company Hedare Beauty, which is ready to ship a new skin cream called Beau-line that is able to reverse the effects of aging.

However, when Patience visits the R&D laboratory facility to deliver a revised ad design, she overhears a discussion between scientist Dr. Ivan Slavicky and Laurel Hedare, the wife of company-owner George Hedare, about the dangerous side effects from continual use of the product. Laurel's guards discover Patience and are ordered to dispose of her.

Patience tries to escape using a conduit pipe, but it is soon sealed off by the guards, who flush the pipe with water. Left for dead she washed up on shore, Patience is mysteriously revived by the Egyptian Mau cat Midnight, which had appeared at her apartment earlier. From that moment on, she develops cat-like metahuman attributes. From Midnight's owner, eccentric researcher Ophelia Powers, Patience learns that Egyptian Mau cats serve as messengers of the goddess Bast. Patience realizes that she is now a "Catwoman", reborn with abilities that are both a blessing and a curse that turn her away from her former meek people-pleasing qualities.

While at home, Patience is annoyed by the ruckus caused by her neighbor's party and lashes out by spraying the amplifiers with water to mute the noise. She disguises herself as a mysterious vigilante named Catwoman to hide her identity, then, under the cover of darkness, searches for answers about what led to her supposed death and subsequent framing for the murder of Slavicky, who she discovers was killed. When Patience confronts George (who is attending an opera with another woman) as Catwoman, he reveals that he knows nothing about the side effects.

The police, led by Patience's love interest, detective Tom Lone, arrive, and Catwoman escapes. Later on, Laurel murders George for his growing suspicions and infidelity and admits to having Dr. Slavicky killed because he wanted to cancel the product's release. She contacts Catwoman and frames her for the murder, planning to release Beau-line to the public the following day. Tom then takes Catwoman into custody.

Patience slips out of her cell and confronts Laurel in her office, rescuing Tom, who came to question Laurel after second thoughts about Patience's guilt, in the process, and revealing that Laurel is the one responsible for her death. As they fight, Patience sees she is unable to hurt Laurel.

Laurel reveals the product's side effects: discontinuing its use makes the skin disintegrate, while continuing its use makes the skin as hard as marble and the user impervious to pain. During the fight, Patience scratches Laurel's face several times, causing her to fall out of a window and grab onto a broken glass pipe. Laurel sees her rapidly disfiguring face in a window's reflection. Horrified, she fails to grab hold of Patience's outstretched hand, causing her to lose her grip and falls to her death.

Although Patience is cleared of any charges made against her regarding the deaths of Dr. Slavicky and the Hedares, she decides to end her relationship with Tom so as to continue living outside the law and enjoy her newfound freedom as Catwoman.

== Cast ==
- Halle Berry as Patience Phillips / Catwoman
- Sharon Stone as Laurel Hedare
- Benjamin Bratt as Detective Tom Lone
- Lambert Wilson as George Hedare
- Frances Conroy as Ophelia Powers
- Alex Borstein as Sally
- Michael Massee as Armando
- Byron Mann as Wesley
- Christopher Heyerdahl as Rocker
- Kim Smith as Drina
- Peter Wingfield as Dr. Ivan Slavicky

Additional cast members include Berend McKenzie as Lance, Ona Grauer as Sandy, Landy Cannon as Randy, Michael Daingerfield as a police forensics analyst, Benita Ha as a forensics technician, and Ryan Robbins as a bartender. Missy Peregrym appears uncredited as the Hedare factory computer monitor image (Beau-line graphics model), depicting the bad effects of the beauty product. A photograph of Michelle Pfeiffer as Selina Kyle in Batman Returns is among various photographs that Ophelia uses to explain the history of former Catwomen.

== Production ==
=== Development ===
With Warner Bros. Pictures developing Batman Forever in June 1993, a Catwoman spin-off film was announced. Michelle Pfeiffer was cast to reprise her role from Batman Returns, Tim Burton became attached as director, and producer Denise Di Novi and writer Daniel Waters also returned. In January 1994, Burton was unsure of his plans to direct Catwoman or an adaptation of The Fall of the House of Usher. On June 16, 1995, Waters turned in his Catwoman script to Warner Bros., the same day Batman Forever was released. Burton was still being courted to direct. Waters joked that "turning it in the day Batman Forever opened may not have been my best logistical move, in that it's the celebration of the fun-for-the-whole-family Batman. Catwoman is definitely not a fun-for-the-whole-family script". In an August 1995 interview, Pfeiffer reiterated her interest in the spin-off but explained her priorities would be challenged as a mother and commitments to other projects.

The film labored in development hell for years with Ashley Judd as the lead in 2001, but she eventually dropped out so Nicole Kidman was considered. When Warner Bros. canceled a Batman vs. Superman film scheduled for 2004, the studio decided to quickly produce Catwoman as replacement, starring Halle Berry. Warner Bros. mandated that the film should be separate from the Batman universe and not have the character mentioned. Berry chose to be involved with the film after the cancellation of Jinx, a James Bond spin-off featuring her character Giacinta "Jinx" Johnson from Die Another Day (2002). Josh Lucas was considered for the role of Tom Lone.

The Catwoman character featured in the film is not Selina Kyle, her identity in the comics, but an original character named Patience Phillips. Screenwriter John Rogers claimed this was due to "an insane rights issue." The film likewise does not use any other characters or settings from DC Comics, aside from a picture of Michelle Pfeiffer as Kyle in Batman Returns.

I checked out some to see how Catwoman is treated in the comics, to make sure that our Catwoman was in the same vein. But I didn't want to be too influenced by the comic book, because the whole point of the movie is to be first a movie, and to be different. Different from Batman, different from Spider-Man – this movie has its own identity. I tried to find my sources more in the character of Catwoman herself. To me, the Catwoman we're filming now with Halle Berry is in the continuity of the others. She's different than Michelle Pfeiffer's character, different from anybody who's played Catwoman in the past. But she is Catwoman. When you look at the differences between the comic book Catwoman and the TV or movie Catwoman, they're all different – but there's a feeling that they are all Catwoman. Halle brings her own personality through her attitude and through her outfit.

— Director Pitof

=== Costume ===
The catsuit was designed by Academy Award-winning costume designer Angus Strathie together with Berry, director Pitof, and producers Di Novi and McDonnell. Strathie explained that they wanted a "reality-based wardrobe to show the progression from demure, repressed Patience to the sensual awakening of a sexy warrior goddess".

=== Choreography and training ===
Berry started intensive fitness training with Harley Pasternak in June 2003. Choreographer Anne Fletcher instructed Berry in cat-like movement, and in the Brazilian martial art style Capoeira. Berry was trained to crack a whip by coach Alex Green.

=== Filming ===
Principal photography began in late September 2003. Shooting took place on 4th Street in downtown Los Angeles, California, in Winnipeg, Manitoba, at Lionsgate Film Studios, Vancouver, British Columbia, and at Warner Bros. Studios Burbank, 4000 Warner Boulevard, Burbank, California. Most of the cats cast in the film came from animal shelters throughout California. Filming finished in March 2004.

Pitof said reshoots happened as late as June 2004 — one month before release — after working cuts yielded confusing, incomplete dialogue sequences and awkward visual transitions. New scenes were added, including a fresh ending that shifted Patience's relationship with Tom from a "romantic comedy"-style conclusion, as Pitof calls it, to a darker, open-ended closer.

Writer John Rogers claimed he was fired during filming due to arguments with the producers, saying "nobody in power knew what movie they wanted."

== Release ==
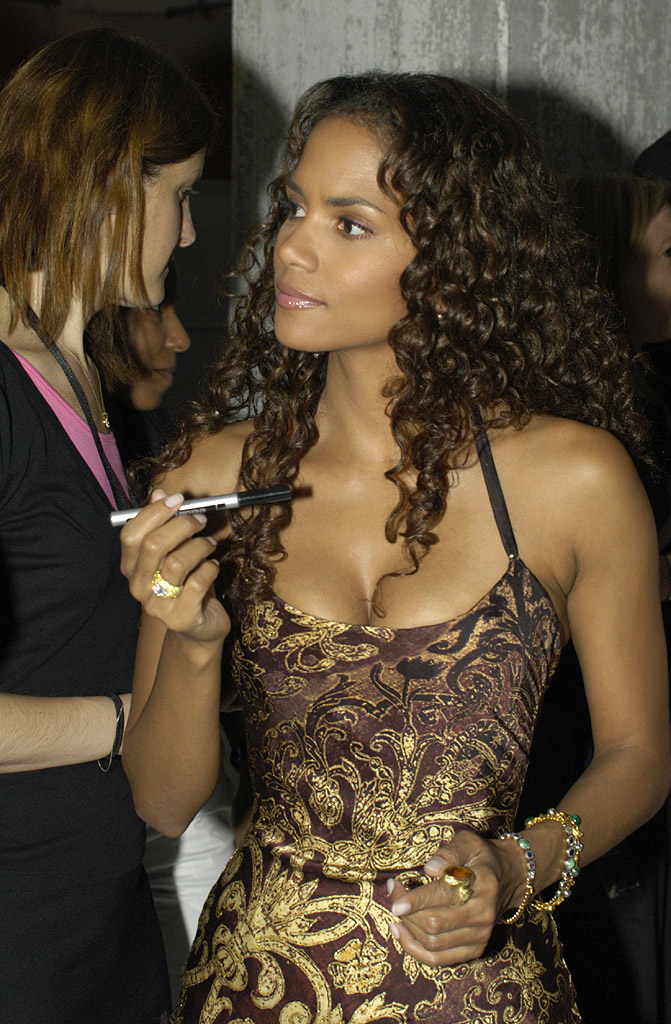
Halle Berry at the Catwoman premiere in Hamburg, Germany

=== Theatrical ===
Catwoman was initially slated for a simultaneous IMAX release alongside its general theatrical debut, as promoted by marketing materials featuring the tagline "CATch Her in IMAX." However, on June 30, 2004, Warner Bros. announced the cancellation of the IMAX release due to delays in the film's visual effects, which prevented sufficient time for remastering the film for the IMAX format.

=== Home media ===
Catwoman was released on VHS and DVD on January 18, 2005, and later on Blu-ray on September 8, 2009.

== Reception ==
=== Box office ===
Catwoman grossed $40.2 million in the United States and Canada, and $42.2 million in other territories, for a worldwide total of $82.4 million against a production budget of $100 million, becoming a box office flop.

The film grossed $16.7 million in its opening weekend at 3,117 theaters with a $5,366 per-theatre average, ranking third behind The Bourne Supremacy and I, Robot. The biggest market in other territories being France, Spain, Japan and Mexico where the film grossed $5.2 million, $4.05 million, $3.05 million and $2.9 million, while topping the Bulgarian weekend listing.

=== Critical response ===
Catwoman was widely panned by critics upon release. The Village Voice reported that critics "universally—and predictably—tore apart Catwoman".

On the review aggregator Rotten Tomatoes, 8% of 195 reviews are positive, with an average rating of 3.3/10. The site's consensus reads: "Halle Berry is the lone bright spot, but even she can't save this laughable action thriller." On Metacritic, it has a weighted average score of 27 out of 100, based on 35 critics, indicating "generally unfavorable" reviews. Audiences polled by CinemaScore gave the film an average grade of "B" on an A+ to F scale.

San Diego Metropolitan Magazine praised Berry's appearance in the costume and the film's action sequences but criticized the script and narrative coherence, finding the actors struggling "to make sense" of the material and calling it one of the worst films of the year. Kirk Honeycutt of The Hollywood Reporter compared the film to Showgirls (1995), suggesting it might gain traction as a cult favorite for its camp value.

Roger Ebert included the film in his list of most hated movies. In his review, he criticized the lack of depth in Berry's character and the film's failure to explore her transformation, stating that the focus was instead on "Halle Berry's beauty, sex appeal, figure, eyes, lips, and costume design." On At the Movies, both Ebert and co-host Richard Roeper gave the film a "thumbs down".

In a gender studies critique of female-led action films, Caroline Heldman argued that Catwoman portrays female agency and power as derivative of sexualization, using the feminist concept of the "male gaze" as a point of contention about the film. Bill Muller of The Arizona Republic commented that Berry should "give back her Academy Award" for participating in the film.

In July 2024, marking the film's 20th anniversary, IndieWire described Catwoman as a "superhero cult classic" and a "sleeper hit". Director Pitof defended the film, stating that it was "ahead of its time" and that audiences were unprepared for a superhero film led by an African American woman. He noted that younger viewers have received the film more positively, in part due to shifts in inclusivity and expectations within the genre. Conversely, the film's screenwriter, John Rogers, called it "a shit movie" with "zero cultural relevance" in 2018.

Despite its critical reception, Berry has expressed affection for the film in retrospect, stating that she enjoyed the experience and appreciates its growing cult following.

=== Accolades ===
Berry accepted the Golden Raspberry Award for Worst Actress in person at the 25th Golden Raspberry Awards for her performance in Catwoman. Arriving on stage with her Academy Award for Best Actress for Monster's Ball (2001) in hand, Berry delivered a humorous and self-deprecating acceptance speech, describing Catwoman as a "god-awful movie" and joking, "It was just what my career needed."

In a later interview, Berry revealed that Warner Bros. was aware of her plans to attend the ceremony and supported her decision to approach it with humor. She stated, "I don't think it's a God-awful film, but I was at the Razzies, so I had to do what they do; I shit on it because they shit on it!" She also noted the speech was carefully written to show she did not take the criticism too seriously, adding, "You can never take away my Oscar, no matter how bad you bash me!"

Award	Ceremony date	Category	Subject	Result	Ref.
Golden Raspberry Awards	February 26, 2005	Worst Picture	Warner Bros.	Won	
Golden Raspberry Awards	February 26, 2005	Worst Director	Pitof	Won	
Golden Raspberry Awards	February 26, 2005	Worst Actress	Halle Berry	Won	
Golden Raspberry Awards	February 26, 2005	Worst Supporting Actor	Lambert Wilson	Nominated	
Golden Raspberry Awards	February 26, 2005	Worst Supporting Actress	Sharon Stone	Nominated	
Golden Raspberry Awards	February 26, 2005	Worst Screen Couple	Halle Berry and either Benjamin Bratt or Sharon Stone	Nominated	
Golden Raspberry Awards	February 26, 2005	Worst Screenplay	John Brancato and Michael Ferris, John Rogers	Won	
Stinkers Bad Movie Awards	2005	Worst Picture	Warner Bros.	Won	
Stinkers Bad Movie Awards	2005	Least "Special" Special Effects	Warner Bros.	Won	
Stinkers Bad Movie Awards	2005	Most Intrusive Musical Score	Warner Bros.	Nominated	
Stinkers Bad Movie Awards	2005	Worst Screenplay	Warner Bros.	Nominated	
Stinkers Bad Movie Awards	2005	Worst Director	Pitof	Won	
Stinkers Bad Movie Awards	2005	Worst Actress	Halle Berry	Won	
Stinkers Bad Movie Awards	2005	Worst Supporting Actress	Sharon Stone	Won	

== Video game ==
A video game based on Catwoman was developed by Argonaut Games and published by Electronic Arts UK. The game features voice acting by Jennifer Hale as the titular character. Although it draws inspiration from the film, the game's plot differs significantly. Upon release, it received negative reviews like the film it was based on and holds a low rating on Metacritic.

== Cancelled animated film ==
In 2003, Warner Bros. approached Batman: The Animated Series producer Boyd Kirkland to write a script for a direct-to-video Catwoman animated feature intended as a tie-in to the film. Although the script was completed, the project was ultimately cancelled following the film's critical and commercial failure.

== See also ==
- List of films based on DC Comics publications
- List of 21st-century films considered the worst
