= Sweta Rai =

Indian film producer

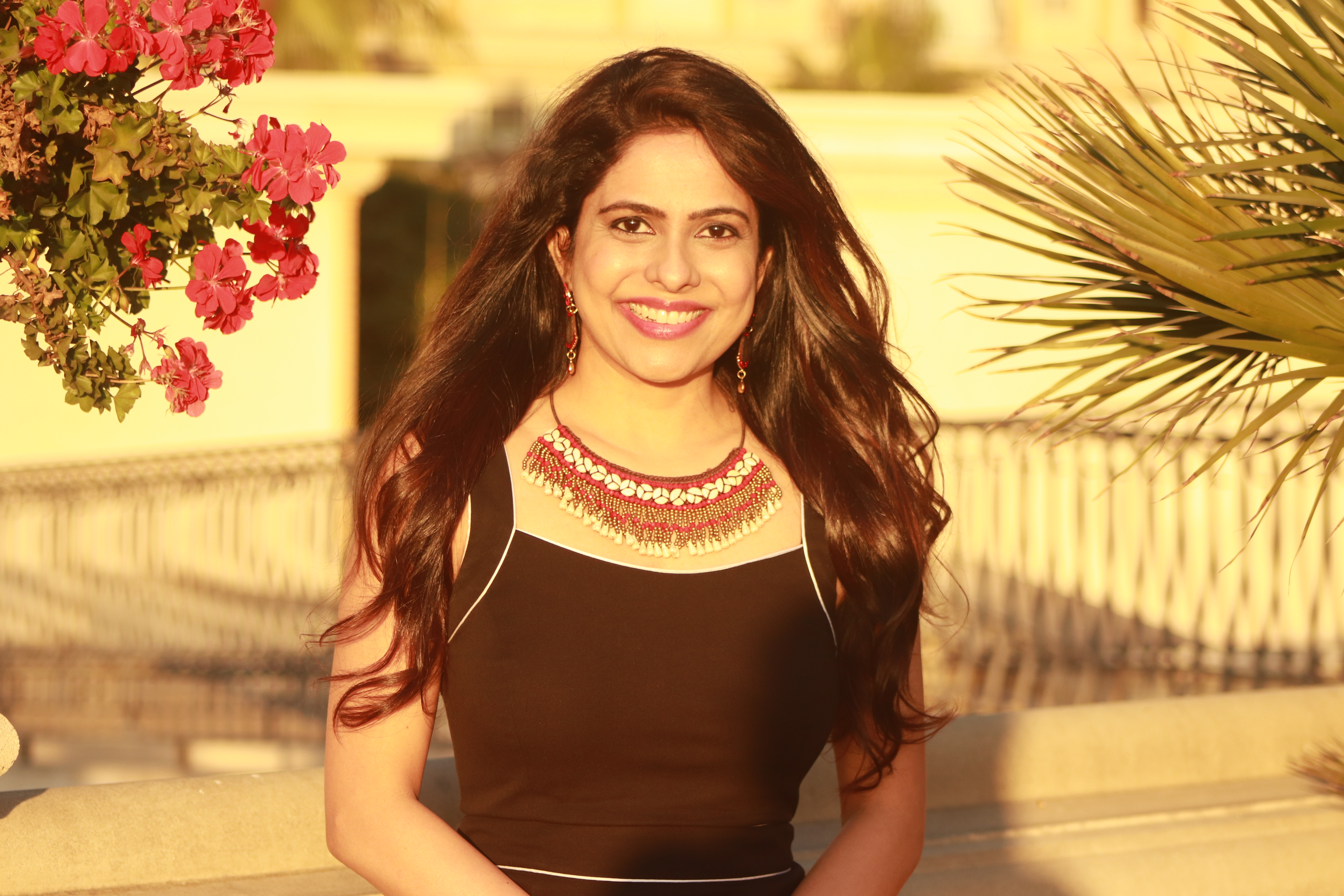
- Sweta Rai in 2020
- Occupations: Film producer entrepreneur film director
- Organization(s): Indo Holly Films; Diverse Cinema
- Website: www.sweta-rai.com

Sweta Rai is an Indian film producer, director and entrepreneur who is based in the United States.

== Film career ==
She runs her own film production company called Indo Holly Films and over-the-top content platform Diverse Cinema. Sweta has a Master of Fine Arts degree in producing from the American Film Institute and she was one of the jury members of the 17th Beverly Hills Film Festival.

Sweta Rai was one of the producers for Surviving the Wild, featuring Jon Voight and Jamie Kennedy. Later, she worked as a supervising producer on the 2020 Hallmark Channel feature film J.L. Family Ranch 2: The Wedding Gift featuring James Caan, Bo Derek, and Trevor Donovan. She has also worked as a co-producer and executive producer for some other films.

In 2020, she produced and directed a documentary feature film called A Pandemic: Away from the Motherland based on COVID-19 pandemic. The film was also in the race for the 93rd Academy Awards.

== Filmography ==
Year	Title	Credited as			Notes	Ref(s)
Year	Title	Producer	Director	Writer	Notes	Ref(s)
2018	Surviving the Wild	Yes	No	No	Co-producer; Directed by Patrick Alessandrin; Co-produced by Steven Paul, Patrick Alessandrin, Vail Bloom, and Michael Givens.	
2020	JL Family Ranch: The Wedding Gift	Yes	No	No	Supervising producer It is the sequel to JL Ranch (2016); Featuring Bo Derek, Skyler Shaye, James Caan, Dylan Walsh, Jon Voight and Abby Brammell.	
2020	A Pandemic: Away from the Motherland	Yes	Yes	Yes	Film was in the race for the 93rd Academy Awards	
TBA	Shades	Yes	Yes	Yes	About skin complexion biases that women face in different parts of the world.	

== Awards and accolades ==
In 2022, she was awarded Women Impact Tech award by American Business Women’s Association as a part of American Business Women's Day.
