= Omar Doom =

American actor and musician (born 1976)

- Born: Omar Makhdomi; June 29, 1976 (age 50); Easton, Pennsylvania, U.S.
- Occupations: Actor; musician; artist
- Years active: 2007–present
- Spouse: Isabella Knight (2010–2013)

Omar Doom (born June 29, 1976) is an American actor, musician, and painter. He played the role as Private First Class Omar Ulmer in the 2009 film Inglourious Basterds, directed by Quentin Tarantino. His current musical project is an electronic/techno/EBM endeavor called STRAIGHT RAZOR.

== Early life and education ==
Omar Doom was born Omar Makhdomi (pronounced Makhdoomi) in Easton, Pennsylvania, to Dr. Rashid and Jawahira Makhdomi, who both are immigrants from Kashmir. His father is a physician at Easton Hospital. He was one of three children, including his two sisters. Doom's parents took the family to a cultural institution or exhibit weekly, including to operas and plays in Manhattan, New York City, or films at a local art house theater.

Doom graduated from Easton Area High School in Easton in 1994. Following graduation, Doom attended Parsons School of Design in Manhattan, where he pursued a degree in painting. During his sophomore year, Doom studied abroad at Parsons Paris.

== Career ==
Doom's initial experience with music was fronting a band called Ordeal in the nineties when he was in high school, and he later returned to a music career after Parsons when he became the frontman of a two-person electronic rock band called Doomington, along with Stretch Armstrong, a successful DJ and music producer. The duo is now defunct.

Doom met director Quentin Tarantino in Los Angeles in 1998 through mutual friends. They have reportedly been close friends ever since. Tarantino has been known to invite Doom over to his home for movie marathons. At one point, Tarantino held a birthday party for Doom. The party included screening of old television shows, cartoons, and films, including Hammerhead and The Mack.

=== Acting ===
Tarantino encouraged Makhdomi to both pursue an acting career and adopt the shorter stage name Omar Doom. Doom was not pursuing acting at the time. Instead, he was working as a musician and co-running a clothing line called Diabla with his sister Saira, where he primarily focused on the clothing line's artwork. Following Tarantino's advice, Doom began studying acting. In an interview during a press junket in Berlin for Inglourious Basterds, Doom described Tarantino's encouragement, "Quentin told me I'd be great in movies. He really pushed me. I decided to go for it. I took his advice, and studied acting."

Tarantino hired Doom for his first acting role, a small part as Vanessa Ferlito's character's love interest, Nate, in the 2007 film Death Proof. Tarantino further cast Doom in a larger role in his next film, Inglourious Basterds. Doom did not know he was cast in the movie until Tarantino called him two weeks before shooting was scheduled to start. Doom was cast as one of the film's eight Basterds, a group of Jewish-American soldiers charged with hunting down and killing Nazi soldiers in occupied France during World War II. Doom attended the Cannes Film Festival with the cast in May 2009. Tarantino would cast Doom once again for the role of Donnie in Once Upon a Time in Hollywood.

=== Music ===
Doom's first release under the name STRAIGHT RAZOR, "Whiskey & Ativan", debuted on Lil Death Records on August 20, 2013. STRAIGHT RAZOR is a blend of industrial, electronic, and EBM styles, and is partly inspired by horror film scores Doom grew up on. The project name was inspired by the black-gloved killers from Italian Giallo films of the 1960s. The single "Whiskey & Ativan" was accompanied by remixes by Monsieur Monsieur (Bromance Records), Thee Mike B (Play it Down Records) and Sinden (Grizzly).

Doom released the first EP under the STRAIGHT RAZOR name, Vol. 1, on July 9, 2021 on Negative Gain Records. A second EP, Vol. 2, followed on July 17, 2022. Doom described Vol. 1 as having a dark and driving intensity to it, while Vol. 2 opened the sound up more. ""I grew up playing in metal bands so creating those same riffs on a synth was a lot of fun," Doom said of Vol. 1. The track "Lady Midday" from Vol. 2 was featured as the title song for the film Spree, starring Joe Keery of Stranger Things. Doom supported the releases with small tours and shows across the US.

A remix album, REMIXED, was released on April 28, 2023 and was the debut release under Doom's own record label, Doom Vision Records. REMIXED features reworked tracks from Vol. 1 & Vol. 2, including remixes by Gost, Corvad, MORIS BLAK, Nightcrawler, Destryur, and Electronic Substance Abuse (ESA). Doom re-released Vol. 1 and Vol. 2 under Doom Vision Records in the summer of 2023.

In addition to his work as STRAIGHT RAZOR, Doom also DJs under the name STRAIGHT RAZOR and Omar Doom.

== Filmography ==
- Grindhouse (2007) – Nate (segment "Death Proof")
- Death Proof (2007) – Nate
- Inglourious Basterds (2009) – Pfc. Omar Ulmer
- Higher Power (2018) – Dario
- The Maestro (2018) – Kubrick
- Once Upon a Time in Hollywood (2019) – Donnie

== Discography ==
=== STRAIGHT RAZOR ===
- Whiskey & Ativan (2013)
- Vol. 1 (2021)
- Vol. 2 (2022)
- REMIXED (2023)
- Casualty (2024)
