= Grindhouse (film) =

2007 double feature consisting of Planet Terror and Death Proof

- Theatrical release poster
- Directed by: Robert Rodriguez; Quentin Tarantino
- Written by: Robert Rodriguez; Quentin Tarantino
- Produced by: Elizabeth Avellán; Erica Steinberg; Robert Rodriguez; Quentin Tarantino
- Starring: Rose McGowan; Freddy Rodriguez; Michael Biehn; Jeff Fahey; Josh Brolin; Marley Shelton; Kurt Russell; Rosario Dawson; Vanessa Ferlito; Jordan Ladd; Sydney Tamiia Poitier; Tracie Thoms; Mary Elizabeth Winstead; Zoë Bell
- Cinematography: Robert Rodriguez; Quentin Tarantino
- Edited by: Robert Rodriguez; Ethan Maniquis; Sally Menke
- Music by: Robert Rodriguez; Graeme Revell; Carl Thiel
- Production companies: Rodriguez International Pictures; Troublemaker Studios
- Distributed by: Dimension Films
- Release date: April 6, 2007 (United States)
- Running time: 191 minutes
- Country: United States
- Language: English
- Budget: $53–67 million
- Box office: $25.4 million (Note: This number only counts the amount grossed when the two films were released collectively as a double bill.)

Grindhouse is a 2007 American anthology film written and directed by Robert Rodriguez and Quentin Tarantino. Presented as a double feature, it combines Rodriguez's Planet Terror, a horror comedy about a group of survivors who battle zombie-like creatures, and Tarantino's Death Proof, a thriller about a murderous stuntman who kills young women with modified vehicles. The former stars Rose McGowan, Freddy Rodriguez, Michael Biehn, Jeff Fahey, Josh Brolin, and Marley Shelton; the latter stars Kurt Russell, Rosario Dawson, Vanessa Ferlito, Jordan Ladd, Sydney Tamiia Poitier, Tracie Thoms, Mary Elizabeth Winstead, Rose McGowan, and Zoë Bell. Grindhouse pays homage to exploitation films of the 1970s, with its title deriving from the now-defunct theaters that would show such films. As part of its theatrical presentation, Grindhouse also features fictitious exploitation trailers directed by Rodriguez, Rob Zombie, Edgar Wright, Eli Roth, and Jason Eisener.

The film was released theatrically by Dimension Films on April 6, 2007, to positive reviews for its tone, thrills, and tribute to exploitation cinema. However, Grindhouse was a commercial failure, grossing $25.4 million on a $53–67 million budget. Due to underperforming at the domestic box office, Planet Terror and Death Proof were released separately in other countries. Initial home media releases also separated Planet Terror and Death Proof; the theatrical version with both films and the fictitious trailers did not appear on home media until 2010. Despite the box office failure, Rodriguez and Tarantino have expressed interest in a possible sequel due to Grindhouse's positive reviews and successful home media sales. The fictitious trailers directed by Rodriguez, Eisener, and Roth later became the basis for their feature films Machete, Hobo with a Shotgun, and Thanksgiving.

== Planet Terror ==
An ordinary evening in a small Texas town becomes a grisly nightmare when a horde of flesh-eating zombies goes on the prowl. Cherry, a go-go dancer, and Wray, her ex-lover, band together with other survivors in a no-holds barred effort to escape the carnage. The odds become a bit more even when Cherry, who lost her leg to a hungry ghoul, gets a machine-gun appendage and lets the bullets fly.

Cast

- Rose McGowan as Cherry Darling
- Freddy Rodriguez as "El Wray"
- Josh Brolin as Dr. William Block
- Marley Shelton as Dr. Dakota Block
- Jeff Fahey as J.T. Hague
- Michael Biehn as Sheriff Hague
- Rebel Rodriguez as Tony Block
- Bruce Willis as Lieutenant Muldoon
- Naveen Andrews as Dr. John "Abby" Abbington
- Julio Oscar Mechoso as Romy
- Fergie as Tammy Visan
- Nicky Katt as Joe
- Hung Nguyen as Dr. Crane
- Tom Savini as Deputy Tolo
- Carlos Gallardo as Deputy Carlos
- Skip Reissig as Skip
- Electra and Elise Avellan as Crazy Babysitter Twins
- Quentin Tarantino as Lewis, Rapist #1
- Greg Kelly as Rapist #2
- Michael Parks as Earl McGraw
- Jerili Romero as Ramona McGraw
- Felix Sabates as Dr. Felix

== Death Proof ==
Stuntman Mike is a professional body double who likes to take unsuspecting women for deadly drives in his free time. He has doctored his car for maximum impact; when Mike purposely causes wrecks, the bodies pile up while he walks away with barely a scratch. The insane Mike may be in over his head, though, when he targets a tough group of female friends, including real-life stuntwoman Zoë Bell, who plays herself.

Cast

- Kurt Russell as Stuntman Mike McKay
- Zoë Bell as herself
- Rosario Dawson as Abernathy Ross
- Vanessa Ferlito as Arlene/Butterfly
- Sydney Tamiia Poitier as Jungle Julia Lucai
- Tracie Thoms as Kim Mathis
- Jordan Ladd as Shanna
- Rose McGowan as Pam
- Mary Elizabeth Winstead as Lee Montgomery
- Quentin Tarantino as Warren
- Marcy Harriell as Marcy
- Eli Roth as Dov
- Omar Doom as Nate
- Michael Bacall as Omar
- Monica Staggs as Lanna Frank
- Jonathan Loughran as Jasper
- Michael Parks as Texas Ranger Earl McGraw
- James Parks as Ranger Edgar McGraw
- Marley Shelton as Dr. Dakota Block

== Fictitious trailers ==
Before each segment, trailers advertising fake films are shown, as well as vintage theater snipes and an ad for a fictional restaurant called Acuña Boys. According to Robert Rodriguez, Quentin Tarantino had the idea to film fake trailers for Grindhouse. "I didn't even know about it until I read it in the trades. It said something like 'Rodriguez and Tarantino doing a double feature and Tarantino says there's gonna be fake trailers.' And I thought, 'There are?'" Rodriguez and Tarantino had originally planned to make all of the film's fake trailers themselves. According to Rodriguez, "We had so many ideas for trailers. I made Machete. I shot lobby cards and the poster and cut the trailer and sent it to Quentin, and he just flipped out because it looked so vintage and so real. He started showing it around to Eli Roth and to Edgar Wright, and they said, 'Can we do a trailer? We have an idea for a trailer!' We were like, 'Hey, let them shoot it. If we don't get around to shooting ours, we'll put theirs in the movie. If theirs come out really great, we'll put it in the movie to have some variety.' Then Rob Zombie came up to me in October at the Scream Awards and said, 'I have a trailer: Werewolf Women of the SS.' I said, 'Say no more. Go shoot it. You got me.'" Each trailer was shot in two days. While Wright and Roth shot only what ended up on screen, Zombie shot enough footage to work into a half-hour short film and was particularly pained to edit it down. Some Canadian screening releases included the South by Southwest-winning trailer Hobo with a Shotgun.

=== Machete ===
Rodriguez wrote Machete in 1993 as a full feature for Danny Trejo. "I had cast him in Desperado and I remember thinking, 'Wow, this guy should have his own series of Mexploitation movies like Charles Bronson or like Jean-Claude Van Damme.' So I wrote him this idea of a federale from Mexico who gets hired to do hatchet jobs in the U.S. I had heard sometimes FBI or DEA have a really tough job that they don't want to get their own agents killed on, they'll hire an agent from Mexico to come do the job for $25,000. I thought, 'That's Machete. He would come and do a really dangerous job for a lot of money to him, but for everyone else over here it's peanuts.' But I never got around to making it." Trejo had previously portrayed the character in a supporting capacity in the Spy Kids film series, also directed by Rodriguez. The trailer was made into a feature film, which was released in September 2010; a sequel, Machete Kills, followed in 2013.

=== Werewolf Women of the SS ===
Rob Zombie's contribution, Werewolf Women of the SS, starred Nicolas Cage as Fu Manchu, Udo Kier as Franz Hess, the commandant of Death Camp 13, Zombie's wife, Sheri Moon Zombie, and Sybil Danning as SS officers/sisters Eva and Gretchen Krupp (the She-Devils of Belzac). Professional wrestlers Andrew "Test" Martin and Oleg "Vladimir Kozlov" Prudius also featured, plus Olja Hrustic, Meriah Nelson, and Lorielle New as the Werewolf Women. According to Zombie, "Basically, I had two ideas. It was either going to be a Nazi movie or a women-in-prison film, and I went with the Nazis. There're all those movies, like Ilsa, She Wolf of the SS, Fräulein Devil, and Love Camp 7—I've always found that to be the most bizarre genre." Zombie is also quoted as saying, "I was getting very conceptual in my own mind with it. ... A lot of times these movies would be made like, 'Well, you know, I've got a whole bunch of Nazi uniforms, but I got this Chinese set, too. We'll put 'em together!' They start jamming things in there, so I took that approach."

=== Don't ===
Edgar Wright's contribution, Don't, was produced in the style of a 1970s Hammer House of Horror film trailer featuring a trio of upper class ivy leaguers being attacked at an estate inhabited by a murderous inbred family of deranged blade-wielding attackers. The trailer featured appearances from Jason Isaacs, Matthew Macfadyen, singer Katie Melua, Lee Ingleby, Georgina Chapman, Emily Booth, Stuart Wilson, Lucy Punch, Rafe Spall, Wright regulars Simon Pegg and Nick Frost, and a voice-over by Will Arnett. Mark Gatiss, MyAnna Buring, Peter Serafinowicz, Michael Smiley, and Nicola Cunningham (who played the zombie "Mary" in Shaun of the Dead), among others, made uncredited cameo appearances. To get the necessary 1970s look, Wright used vintage lenses and old-style graphics. During editing, he scratched some of the film with steel wool and dragged it around a parking lot to make it appear neglected by wayward projectionists. According to Wright, "In the '70s, when American International would release European horror films, they'd give them snazzier titles. And the one that inspired me was this Jorge Grau film: In the UK, it's called The Living Dead at Manchester Morgue. In Spain and in Italy, I think it's called Do Not Speak Ill of the Dead. But in the States, it was called Don't Open the Window. I just loved the fact that there isn't a big window scene in the film—it's all based around the spin and the voiceover not really telling you what the hell is going on in the film." On the Charlie Rose talk show, Quentin Tarantino also pointed out another aspect of American advertising of British films in the 1970s that was being referenced—none of the actors has any dialogue in the trailer, as if the trailer was intentionally edited to prevent American viewers from realizing that the film is British.

=== Thanksgiving ===
Eli Roth directs the fictitious trailer Thanksgiving.

Eli Roth's contribution is a promotion for the slasher opus Thanksgiving. Produced in the style of holiday-themed slasher films such as Halloween, My Bloody Valentine, Silent Night, Deadly Night, and April Fool's Day, the trailer starred Jeff Rendell as a killer who stalks victims while dressed as a Pilgrim, Jordan Ladd, Jay Hernandez, and Roth himself as his intended victims, and Michael Biehn as the Sheriff. The design for the titles in Thanksgiving was based on a Mad magazine slasher parody titled Arbor Day. Excerpts of the score from Creepshow were used in the faux trailer.

According to Roth, "My friend Jeff, who plays the killer Pilgrim – we grew up in Massachusetts, we were huge slasher-movie fans and every November we were waiting for the Thanksgiving slasher movie. We had the whole movie worked out: A kid who's in love with a turkey, and then his father killed it, and then he killed his family and went away to a mental institution and came back and took revenge on the town. I called Jeff and said, 'Dude, guess what, we don't have to make the movie, we can just shoot the best parts.'" "Shooting the trailer was so much fun," Roth has stated, "because every shot is a money shot. Every shot is decapitation or nudity. It's so ridiculous, it's absurd. It's just so wrong and sick that it's right."

Roth's fake trailer contained elements that almost earned Grindhouse an NC-17 rating, including a cheerleader simultaneously stripping, bouncing on a trampoline, and getting stabbed in the vulva, and three decapitations, the first victim dressed as a Pilgrim turkey at a parade gets decapitated and his headless body stumbles around in an exaggerated manner, the second occurs as the victim's girlfriend performs fellatio on him, and the last decapitation occurs on a man while he is being kissed by a female victim. According to Roth, "Instead of seeing it spread out in a feature, watching it all jammed together nonstop makes it more shocking. But we had a great discussion with the ratings board. They got it. Once they saw it with all the bad splices and the distress and scratches they were fine with it."

In 2010, Roth confirmed in an interview with Cinema Blend's Eric Eisenberg that he and co-writer Jeff Rendell were working on a possible feature film. Roth announced in January 2023 that he had left reshoots of the 2024 Borderlands film to work on shooting Thanksgiving, though was still involved with the Borderlands project and had given his replacement Tim Miller his blessing to complete the reshoots. The feature film was released in November 2023 by TriStar Pictures.

=== Hobo with a Shotgun ===
Some screenings of Grindhouse (mainly in Canada) also featured a fake trailer for a film titled Hobo with a Shotgun. The trailer, created by Dartmouth, Nova Scotia filmmakers Jason Eisener, John Davies, and Rob Cotterill, won Robert Rodriguez's South by Southwest Grindhouse trailers contest. In the trailer, David Brunt plays a vagabond with a 20-gauge shotgun, who becomes a vigilante. In the trailer, he is shown killing numerous persons, ranging from armed robbers to corrupt cops to a pedophilic Santa Claus. The trailer was available in certain selected movie theaters in the United States and Canada.

In 2010, the trailer was made into a full-length feature film starring Rutger Hauer as the hobo, with Brunt playing a dirty cop. Hobo with a Shotgun was the second of Grindhouse's fake trailers to be turned into a feature film. The film was released March 25, 2011 in Canada, April 1, 2011 on American video on demand, and May 6, 2011, in U.S. theatres.

== History and development ==
The poster for a double feature consisting of the films Dragstrip Girl and Rock All Night sparked the idea for Grindhouse.

The idea for Grindhouse came to Robert Rodriguez and Quentin Tarantino when Tarantino set up screenings of double features in his house, complete with trailers before and in between the films. During one screening in 2003, Rodriguez noticed that he owned the same double-feature movie poster as Tarantino for the 1957 films Dragstrip Girl and Rock All Night. Rodriguez asked Tarantino, "I always wanted to do a double feature. Hey, why don't you direct one and I'll do the other?" Tarantino quickly replied, "And we've got to call it Grindhouse!"

The film's name originates from the American term for theaters that played "all the exploitation genres: kung fu, horror, giallo, sexploitation, the 'good old boy' redneck car-chase movies, blaxploitation, spaghetti Westerns—all those risible genres that were released in the 70s." According to Rodriguez, "The posters were much better than the movies, but we're actually making something that lives up to the posters."

Rodriguez first came up with the idea for Planet Terror during the production of The Faculty: "I remember telling Elijah Wood and Josh Hartnett, all these young actors, that zombie movies were dead and hadn't been around in a while, but that I thought they were going to come back in a big way because they'd been gone for so long. I said, 'We've got to be there first.' I had [a script] I'd started writing. It was about 30 pages, and I said to them, 'There are characters for all of you to play.' We got all excited about it, and then I didn't know where to go with it. The introduction was about as far as I'd gotten, and then I got onto other movies. Sure enough, the zombie [movie] invasion happened and they all came back again, and I was like, 'Ah, I knew that I should've made my zombie film.'" The story was approached again when Tarantino and Rodriguez developed the idea for Grindhouse.

As Planet Terror took shape, Tarantino developed the story for Death Proof, based on his fascination for the way stuntmen would "death-proof" their cars. As long as they were driving, stuntmen could slam their cars headfirst into a brick wall at 60 mph (100 km/h) and survive. This inspired Tarantino to create a slasher film featuring a deranged stuntman who stalks and murders sexy young women with his "death-proof" car. Tarantino remembers, "I realized I couldn't do a straight slasher film, because with the exception of women-in-prison films, there is no other genre quite as rigid. And if you break that up, you aren't really doing it anymore. It's inorganic, so I realized—let me take the structure of a slasher film and just do what I do. My version is going to be fucked up and disjointed, but it seemingly uses the structure of a slasher film, hopefully against you."

According to Rodriguez, "[Tarantino] had an idea and a complete vision for it right away when he first talked about it. He started to tell me the story and said, 'It's got this death-proof car in it.' I said, 'You have to call it Death Proof.' I helped title the movie, but that's it." Of the car chases, Tarantino stated, "CGI for car stunts doesn't make any sense to me—how is that supposed to be impressive? ... I don't think there have been any good car chases since I started making films in '92—to me, the last terrific car chase was in Terminator 2. And Final Destination 2 had a magnificent car action piece. In between that, not a lot. Every time a stunt happens, there's twelve cameras and they use every angle for Avid editing, but I don't feel it in my stomach. It's just action."

== Production ==
=== Direction ===
According to actress Marley Shelton, "Rodriguez and Tarantino really co-directed, at least Planet Terror. Quentin was on set a lot. He had notes and adjustments to our performances and he changed lines every once in a while. Of course, he always deferred to Robert on Planet Terror and vice versa for Death Proof. So it's really both of their brainchild." Tarantino has stated, "I can't imagine doing Grindhouse with any other director in the way me and Robert did it because I just had complete faith and trust in him. So much so that we didn't actually see each other's movie completed until three weeks before the film opened. It was as if we worked in little vacuums and cut our movies down, and then put them together and watched it all play, and then made a couple of little changes after that, and pretty much that was it."

=== Casting ===
Many of the cast members had previously worked with both directors. Before appearing in Grindhouse, Marley Shelton had auditioned for The Faculty, but Rodriguez chose not to cast her. She was eventually cast in the role of a customer in the opening sequence of Sin City. Bruce Willis had appeared in both Tarantino's Pulp Fiction and Rodriguez's Sin City, in addition to having a cameo appearance in a segment Tarantino directed for the anthology film Four Rooms. Tom Savini had previously acted in From Dusk till Dawn, which was written by Tarantino and directed by Rodriguez. Michael Parks reprises the role of Texas Ranger Earl McGraw in Planet Terror and Death Proof. Parks first portrayed the role in From Dusk Till Dawn. His son, James, appears in Death Proof as Edgar McGraw, a character that first appeared in From Dusk till Dawn 2: Texas Blood Money. The first time the two characters appeared together was in Tarantino's Kill Bill. Tarantino himself plays small roles in both segments of Grindhouse, and director Eli Roth, who contributed the fake trailer Thanksgiving and whose film Hostel was produced by Tarantino, has a Supporting Role in Death Proof.

Tarantino attempted to cast both Kal Penn and Sylvester Stallone in Death Proof, but both were unable to work due to prior commitments. In an interview, Tarantino revealed that he decided to cast Kurt Russell as the killer stunt driver because "for people of my generation, he's a true hero ... but now, there's a whole audience out there that doesn't know what Kurt Russell can do. When I open the newspaper and see an ad that says 'Kurt Russell in Dreamer,' or 'Kurt Russell in Miracle,' I'm not disparaging these movies, but I'm thinking: When is Kurt Russell going to be a badass again?"

Rodriguez later revealed that he cast Rose McGowan as Cherry Darling in response to McGowan's blacklisting from the productions of The Weinstein Company (then the parent company of Grindhouse's distributor Dimension Films) following Harvey Weinstein's alleged sexual assault of her.

=== Cinematography ===
Rodriguez and Tarantino each acted as cinematographer on their segments. Although Rodriguez had previously worked as the cinematographer on six of his own feature films, Death Proof marked Tarantino's first credit as a cinematographer. The director of photography for Rob Zombie's fake trailer Werewolf Women of the SS was Phil Parmet, with whom Zombie had first worked on The Devil's Rejects. The director of photography for Eli Roth's fake trailer Thanksgiving was Milan Chadima, with whom Roth had previously worked on Hostel.

=== Special effects ===
The intentionally "aged" look of the film, as seen in the trailer Machete

Though set in the modern day, the film uses various unconventional techniques to make the films look like those that were shown in grindhouse theaters in the 1970s. Throughout both feature-length segments and the fake trailers, the film is intentionally damaged to make it look like many of the exploitation films of the 1970s, which were generally shipped around from theater to theater and usually ended up in bad shape. To reproduce the look of damaged film reels in Planet Terror, five of the six 25,000-frame reels were edited with real film damage, plug-ins, and stock footage.

Planet Terror makes heavy use of digital effects throughout the film. Perhaps the most notable effect is Cherry's (Rose McGowan) fake leg. To accomplish the fake leg that Cherry sports after her accident, during post-production, the effects teams digitally removed McGowan's right leg from the shots and replaced it with computer-generated props—first a table leg and then an M16 rifle. During shooting for these scenes, McGowan wore a special cast which restricted her leg movement to give her the correct motion, and helped the effects artists to digitally remove it during post-production.

=== Editing ===
During editing, Tarantino and Rodriguez came up with the idea of inserting "missing reels" into the film. "[Quentin] was about to show an Italian crime movie with Oliver Reed", Rodriguez recalls, "and he was saying, 'Oh, it's got a missing reel in it. But it's really interesting because after the missing reel, you don't know if he slept with a girl or he didn't because she says he did and he says that he didn't. It leaves you guessing, and the movie still works with 20 minutes gone out of it.' I thought, 'Oh, my God, that's what we've got to do. We've got to have a missing reel!' I'm going to use it in a way where it actually says 'missing reel' for 10 seconds, and then when we come back, you're arriving in the third act. ... The late second acts in movies are usually the most predictable and the most boring, that's where the good guy really turns out to be the bad guy, and the bad guy is really good, and the couple becomes friends. Suddenly, though, in the third act, all bets are off and it's a whole new story anyway."

On the editing of Death Proof, Tarantino stated, "There is half-an-hour's difference between my Death Proof and what is playing in Grindhouse. ... I was like a brutish American exploitation distributor who cut the movie down almost to the point of incoherence. I cut it down to the bone and took all the fat off it to see if it could still exist, and it worked." An extended, 127-minute version of Death Proof was screened in competition for the Palme d'Or at the 60th Cannes Film Festival. Tarantino is quoted as saying, "It works great as a double feature, but I'm just as excited if not more excited about actually having the world see Death Proof unfiltered. ... It will be the first time everyone sees Death Proof by itself, including me."

Grindhouse is rated R in the United States for "strong graphic bloody violence and gore, pervasive language, some sexuality, nudity, and drug use". Shortly after, the film officially received an R-rating from the MPAA. Ain't It Cool News reported that according to Tarantino, only minimal cuts were made which ended up totaling 20 seconds.

=== Soundtrack influences ===
The music for Planet Terror was composed by Rodriguez. Inspiration for his score came from John Carpenter, whose music was often played on set. A cover version of the Dead Kennedys' "Too Drunk to Fuck" performed by Nouvelle Vague was also featured. The soundtrack for Death Proof consists entirely of nonoriginal music, including excerpts from the scores of other films. Soundtrack albums for both segments were released on April 3, 2007.

== Reception ==
=== Box office ===
Grindhouse performed poorly at the box office, surprising box-office analysts and fans alike given the strong reviews and favorable media buzz. Costing $53 million to produce, Grindhouse opened poorly with "a disappointing $11.5 million" in the United States, making a per-theater average of $4,417; box office analysts originally predicted an opening weekend total of at least $20–$30 million.

The opening weekend box-office total stood below not only the second weekends of Blades of Glory and Meet the Robinsons, but also fell below the opening weekend gross of the poorly reviewed Are We Done Yet?. In an attempt to explain the film's disappointing opening weekend, box-office analyst Brandon Gray suggested that Grindhouse "suffered the usual horror comedy dilemma that afflicted Snakes on a Plane and Slither, among others - too funny to be scary, too scary to be funny." Box-office analyst Lee Tistaert of tracking website Lee's Movie Info compared the result with what may have happened if Tarantino's Kill Bill saga had been released as one film, instead of two separate volumes. "Is it possible that Tarantino got his wish this time as a result of two back-to-back $60 million grosses?" he asked. Others attributed the film's disappointing opening to the timing of Easter weekend, noting that the weekend is more tailored for family-oriented films or light comedy, not exploitative horror films. The film's length—running more than three hours—also hurt, keeping away casual theater-goers and limiting the number of screenings that could be held in a day.

Quentin Tarantino was quoted as saying about the film's box-office results, "It was disappointing, yeah. But the movie worked with the audience. ... People who saw it loved it and applauded. ... I'm proud of my flop." Harvey Weinstein said that he was so "incredibly disappointed" with the film's opening weekend that he was considering re-releasing it as two separate films and possibly adding back the "missing" scenes. The film altogether earned $25,422,088 in ticket sales. Grindhouse was separated and released internationally: Death Proof grossed $30,663,961, while Planet Terror grossed $10,871,224, bringing Grindhouse's total gross to $67 million.

In 2017, Rodriguez told Variety that he thinks Weinstein "buried" the film, due to the director's decision to cast Rose McGowan in Planet Terror. The actress had previously accused Weinstein of raping her.

In 2020, Tarantino said he considers Grindhouse his most misunderstood film:

"With Grindhouse, I think me and Robert just felt that people had a little more of a concept of the history of double features and exploitation movies. No, they didn't. At all. They had no idea what the fuck they were watching. It meant nothing to them, alright, what we were doing. So that was a case of being a little too cool for school."

=== Critical reception ===
Review aggregator website Rotten Tomatoes reported that 84% of 194 critics gave the film a positive review, with an average rating of 7.4/10. The site's critics consensus reads, "Grindhouse delivers exhilarating exploitation fare with wit and panache, improving upon its source material with feral intelligence." Metacritic assigned the film an average rating system of 77 out of 100 based on 36 critics, indicating "generally favorable" reviews. Audiences polled by CinemaScore gave the film an average grade of "B+" on an A+ to F scale.

Entertainment Weekly awarded the film a "B+" rating, praising it as a "crazily funny and exciting tribute to the grimy glory days of 1970s exploitation films" that "will leave you laughing, gasping, thrilled at a movie that knows, at long last, how to put the bad back in badass." Peter Travers of Rolling Stone gave the film a positive review, commenting, "by stooping low without selling out, this babes-and-bullets tour de force gets you high on movies again." Critic James Berardinelli also enjoyed the film, but was not as positive as other critics. Awarding the film three stars (out of four), Berardinelli found the film to be "cinema as an expression of pulp with attitude ... [Rodriguez and Tarantino] are speaking from the hearts ... but that doesn't mean everyone sitting in the theater will get it."

The critics who did not like the film were not amused by the film's graphic and comical violence, with Larry Ratliff of San Antonio Express-News noting, "this ambitious, scratched, and weathered venture never manages a real death grip on the senses." Mick LaSalle of the San Francisco Chronicle awarded the film a high rating, but noted, "the Rodriguez segment is terrific; the Tarantino one long-winded and juvenile." Others considered Death Proof to be a deeper and more noteworthy segment. Critic A. O. Scott of The New York Times noted, "[a]t a certain point in Death Proof, the scratches and bad splices disappear, and you find yourself watching not an arch, clever pastiche of old movies and movie theaters, but an actual movie." Chicago Sun-Times critic Roger Ebert was divided. He gave Grindhouse as a whole two and a half stars out of four, awarding Planet Terror two stars and Death Proof three stars. Ebert also noted the irony of grindhouse films largely being superseded by many big-budget, R-rated, mainstream films that included a great deal of nudity and graphic violence.

Critics generally enjoyed the fake trailers. Geoff Pevere of the Toronto Star wrote that the use of the trailers helps the film establish "its credibility as both mock-artifact and geeky fetish object even before the opening feature." Todd McCarthy of Variety claimed that the trailers were "excellent candidates for exploitation immortality". Jeff Vice of Deseret News, who gave the feature films negative reviews, called the trailers "the strongest aspect of the entire presentation". Maitland McDonagh of TV Guide added, "With the exception of Werewolf Women, which tries a little too hard, they're all spot-on pastiches."

The double feature appeared at number six on Jack Mathews and Owen Gleiberman's respective top-10 lists for New York Daily News and Entertainment Weekly, and at number seven on Stephanie Zacharek's list for Salon. Marc Savlov listed Death Proof at number 10 on his list for The Austin Chronicle.

== Release ==
=== Theatrical ===
Outside the US and Canada, Planet Terror and Death Proof were released separately in extended versions, about two months apart. The poster artwork for each film's release in the Netherlands claimed that Death Proof would feature "coming attractions" from Rodriguez, while Planet Terror would feature "coming attractions" from Tarantino. While the separated version of Planet Terror includes the Machete trailer, none of the other fake trailers was included when the features were released individually.

In reaction to the possibility of a split in a foreign release, Tarantino stated, "Especially if they were dealing with non-English language countries, they don't really have this tradition ... not only do they not really know what a grindhouse is, they don't even have the double-feature tradition. So you are kind of trying to teach us something else." Many European fans saw the split as an attempt to increase profits by forcing audiences to pay twice for what was shown as a single film in the United States.

In the United Kingdom, Death Proof was released on September 21, 2007. The release of Planet Terror followed on November 9 with an eventual, theatrical, limited run of the entire Grindhouse feature the following year. Death Proof was screened in Europe in the extended version that was presented in competition at the Cannes film festival. The additional material includes scenes that were replaced in the American theatrical release version with a "missing reel" title card, such as the lap dance scene. A total of about 27 minutes was added for this version. In Australia, the edited version of Death Proof was first screened on November 1, 2007, as a separate film. However, from January 17, 2008, Grindhouse had limited screenings. In April 2008, Grindhouse was screened by Dendy Cinemas in one venue at a time across the country, through the use of a traveling 35 mm reel. In South America, Planet Terror was released in January 2010, while Death Proof was released in July 2010 at least in Brazil.

=== Home media ===
Death Proof and Planet Terror were released separately on DVD in the United States. The trailers were omitted from Death Proof, with the exception of Machete which was from Planet Terror. Death Proof was released on September 18, 2007, with Planet Terror following on October 16, 2007. Both were two-disc special editions featuring extended versions of the films. Robert Rodriguez stated in his 10-Minute Film School that a box set of the two films would be available soon, and that his 10-Minute Cook School would appear on it. This release would also reportedly include Hobo with a Shotgun. A six-DVD edition of the film was released on March 21, 2008, in Japan, featuring the films in both their individual extended versions and in the abridged double feature presentation along with previously unreleased special features.

Planet Terror and Death Proof were released individually on Blu-ray Disc on December 16, 2008, in North America. The Blu-ray edition of Planet Terror also contained a "scratch-free" version of the film that removed much of the damage effects, while the Blu-ray edition of Death Proof only contained the "damaged" version of the film. The theatrical version of Grindhouse was released on Region 2 DVD and the stand-alone version of Death Proof HD DVD was released in Germany on December 31, 2009.

A two-disc Blu-ray "Special Edition" of Grindhouse was released on October 5, 2010, in the US by Vivendi Entertainment and has exclusive bonus features. This release marked the first time that US viewers could view the full Grindhouse "Double Feature Presentation" experience at home as it was originally released in theaters. The first disc of the 2-disc set contains Death Proof and Planet Terror, along with the faux trailers, including the "trailer" for Machete. The theatrical cut was released on DVD in Canada from Alliance Atlantis. All of the extras from the previous individual DVD releases were included, however none of the extras from the Special Edition Blu-ray were included.

Bill Moseley stated at FanExpo on August 27, 2010, that the Blu-ray would also include a 5-minute version of Werewolf Women of the SS.

== Future ==
In 2010, Rodriguez wrote and co-directed a feature-length adaptation of his fake trailer, Machete. Many of the original actors from the trailer returned to their roles for it, including Danny Trejo in the title role. Machete screened September 1 at the Venice Film Festival and was released across cinemas in the US on September 3, 2010. It proved to be more of a success at the box office than Grindhouse, grossing $44 million internationally against a just-over $10 million budget. Two sequels were announced at the end of the film, which Rodriguez confirmed were scheduled to be filmed. Machete Kills, the second film, was released in 2013, but was unable to match the critical and commercial success of its predecessor. In 2015, Trejo said filming was scheduled to begin on Machete Kills Again... In Space, the planned third film, but no updates on the project have been made since.

A trailer that played in some theaters in the United States and Canada, Hobo with a Shotgun, was adapted into a feature in 2011. Rutger Hauer replaced David Brunt as the eponymous character, with Brunt making a cameo as a corrupt cop.

In 2023, it was announced a feature film based on Roth's Thanksgiving trailer was in the works from Spyglass Media Group, which owns the Weinstein Company library, with Roth directing from a script by Jeff Rendell and Roger Birnbaum and Roth producing. The film features a different cast from the fictitious trailer, led by Patrick Dempsey. It was released by TriStar Pictures in November 2023.

Both Rodriguez and Tarantino have said that they are interested in making a sequel to Grindhouse. Tarantino said that he wants to shoot an "old-school Kung Fu movie in Mandarin with subtitles in some countries, and release a shorter, dubbed cut in others" for his segment. It has also been reported by Rotten Tomatoes that Edgar Wright may expand Don't into a feature film. According to Eli Roth, Wright and he have discussed the possibility of pairing Don't with Thanksgiving for a Grindhouse sequel. Roth is quoted as saying "We're talking to Dimension about it. I think they're still trying to figure out Grindhouse 1 before we think about Grindhouse 2, but I've already been working on the outline for it and I would do it in a heartbeat."

Electra and Elise Avellan, Rodriguez's nieces, who play the Crazy Babysitter Twins in both films, originally stated their uncle wanted to do a sequel featuring both Machete and The Babysitter Twins, but the latter concept did not materialize with the former's release. "Robert mentioned something about the end of the world and Hollywood action films, where we'd be trained in Mexico to come back here and fight", Electra Avellan told Bloody Disgusting.

== See also ==
- List of films featuring fictional films
- Movie Movie (1978)

== Bibliography ==
- Church, David. Grindhouse Nostalgia: Memory, Home Video, and Exploitation Film Fandom. Edinburgh University Press, 2015.
- Tarantino, Quentin. Death Proof: A Screenplay. Weinstein Books, 2007. ISBN 1602860092.
- Tarantino, Quentin and Rodriguez, Robert. Grindhouse: The Sleaze-filled Saga of an Exploitation Double Feature. Weinstein Books, 2007. ISBN 1602860149. The book includes forewords by both directors, interviews, a history of grind houses, and behind-the-scenes information about the production of the film, such as the soundtrack from director John Carpenter. In addition, the book also includes the complete scripts for Planet Terror and the faux trailers Machete and Thanksgiving.
