= Electra and Elise Avellan =

Venezuelan actresses

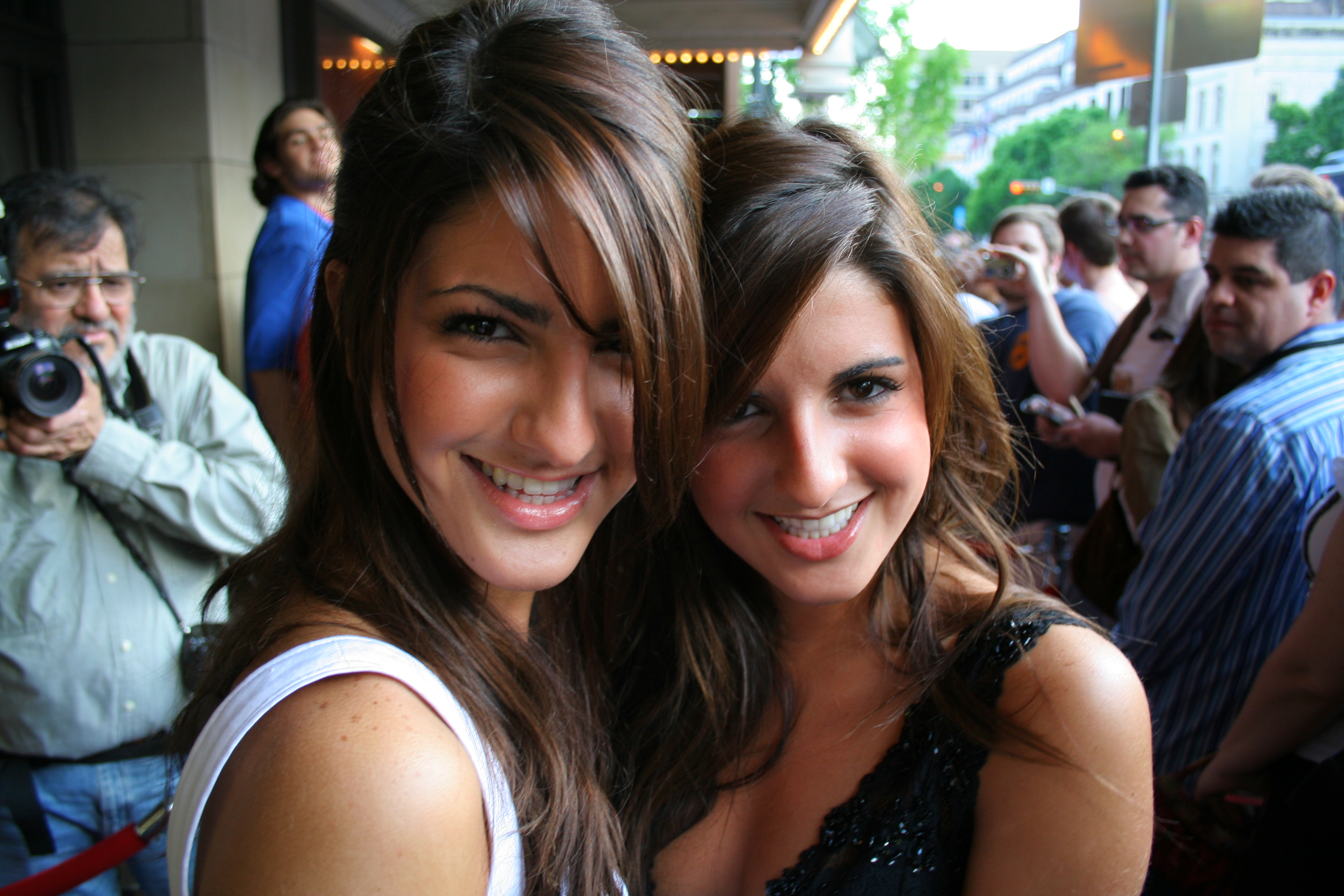
- The twins at the premiere of Grindhouse in Austin, Texas, March 2007
- Born: August 12, 1986 (age 39); Caracas, Venezuela
- Occupation(s): producer actress
- Years active: 2007–present

Electra Amelia Avellan and Elise Avellan (born Electra Isabel) (identical twins, born August 12, 1986) are Venezuelan actresses. They are best known for their roles as the "Crazy Babysitter Twins" in the 2007 film Grindhouse and as Nurses "Mona and Lisa" in 2010's Machete. Electra and Elise reprised these roles in the 2013 Machete follow-up Machete Kills. They were born in Caracas, Venezuela. Their father is a sibling of producer Elizabeth Avellan, who was married to director Robert Rodriguez. Their mother was a model and actress. The twins appear together in the April 2007 issue of Maxim En Espanol.

== Electra's filmography ==
Year	Film	Role	Notes
2007	Grindhouse	Crazy Babysitter Twin	Segment: Death Proof
2007	Grindhouse	Crazy Babysitter Twin	Segment: Planet Terror
2008	The Horrorhound	Herself	
2009	The Black Waters of Echo's Pond	Renee	
2009	Pearblossom (Sunset Vampires)	Rhea	
2010	Machete	Nurse Mona	
2010	Now Here	Rena Lopez	
2011	Not Another Not Another Movie	Associate Producer	
2012	Sushi Girl	Co-Producer	
2012	Stripped	Candice	
2013	Counterpunch	Co-Producer	
2013	Machete Kills	Nurse Mona	
2013	Flying Monkeys	Sonya	
2014	Hidden in the Woods	Anny	TV movie
2014	The Final Breath	Actress	
2015	Space Awards	Host	(with Danny Trejo)
2020	Son of Monarchs	Lucía	

== Elise's filmography ==
Year	Film	Role	Notes
2007	Grindhouse	Crazy Babysitter Twin	Segment: Death Proof
2007	Grindhouse	Crazy Babysitter Twin	Segment: Planet Terror
2008	The Horrorhound	Herself	
2009	The Black Waters of Echo's Pond	Erica	
2010	Machete	Nurse Lisa	
2013	Machete Kills	Nurse Lisa	
2015	Space Awards	Host	(with Danny Trejo)
