= Machete Kills =

2013 film by Robert Rodriguez

- Theatrical release poster
- Directed by: Robert Rodriguez
- Screenplay by: Kyle Ward
- Story by: Robert Rodriguez; Marcel Rodriguez
- Produced by: Robert Rodriguez; Rick Schwartz; Sergei Bespalov; Alexander Rodnyansky; Aaron Kaufman; Iliana Nikolic
- Starring: Danny Trejo; Michelle Rodriguez; Sofía Vergara; Amber Heard; Lady Gaga; Carlos Estévez; Antonio Banderas; Cuba Gooding Jr.; Walton Goggins; William Sadler; Demián Bichir; Mel Gibson
- Cinematography: Robert Rodriguez
- Edited by: Robert Rodriguez; Rebecca Rodriguez
- Music by: Carl Thiel; Robert Rodriguez
- Production companies: AR Films; Demarest Films; Quick Draw Productions; Aldamisa Entertainment; Overnight Productions; 1821 Pictures
- Distributed by: Open Road Films
- Release dates: September 19, 2013 (Austin Fantastic Fest); October 11, 2013 (United States)
- Running time: 108 minutes
- Country: United States
- Languages: English; Spanish
- Budget: $20 million
- Box office: $17.5 million

Machete Kills (also known as Robert Rodriguez's Machete Kills) is a 2013 American action exploitation film directed by Robert Rodriguez, with a screenplay by Kyle Ward, from a story by Robert and Marcel Rodriguez. Starring Danny Trejo, who returns in his role as the eponymous character, it is a sequel to Machete (2010), and is the third film based on a fake trailer in Grindhouse (2007). Michelle Rodriguez, Tom Savini, Electra and Elise Avellan, Felix Sabates, and Jessica Alba reprise their roles from the first film, and are joined by series newcomers Sofía Vergara, Amber Heard, Lady Gaga, Charlie Sheen (credited by his birth name of "Carlos Estévez"), Antonio Banderas, Cuba Gooding Jr., Walt Goggins, William Sadler, Demián Bichir and Mel Gibson. The film follows the titular ex-federal (Trejo) as he is recruited by the U.S. President (Sheen) to stop an arms dealer (Gibson) and a revolutionary (Bichir).

Machete Kills was released in the United States by Open Road Films on October 11, 2013.

== Plot ==
Machete Cortez and agent Sartana Rivera attempt to arrest corrupt military members involved in a weapons deal with a Mexican drug cartel group. The gangsters wipe out the military team, but they in turn are wiped by another party of masked men headed by a luchador-masked leader who kills Sartana. Machete is arrested and hanged by corrupt Sheriff Doakes and Deputy Clebourne. However, he survives the hanging and the officers receive a call from US President Rathcock. At the White House, Rathcock offers to wipe Machete's criminal record and grant him citizenship if he can confirm a threat from Marcos Mendez, a psychopath who wants to fire a nuclear missile at Washington, D.C. if the American government does not stop the cartels and the corrupt Mexican government.

Machete travels to San Antonio, where he meets handler and beauty contestant Blanca Vasquez. At Acapulco he looks for Cereza, who can lead him to Mendez, but is attacked by brothel madam Desdemona, Cereza's mother. As Mendez's beloved virgin, Cereza warns Machete about Mendez's split personality. As they travel to Mendez's headquarters, Mendez's enforcer Zaror receives a call from Mendez and shoots Cereza.

Machete learns that Mendez has wired the missile's launch device to his own heart so that if he dies, the missile fires. Mendez kills the device's designer and activates its 24-hour timer. Killing Zaror along the way, Machete intends to escort Mendez to the US and find a way to disarm the missile. Mendez shares that he is a self-proclaimed secret agent who tried to expose his corrupt superiors, only to be betrayed and forced to watch his wife and family being tortured and killed, causing him to develop a split personality.

As they head to the border, a hit is put on Machete, and the two are targeted by multiple assailants including Desdemona and her prostitute assassins, a shapeshifting hitman called El/La Camaleón, Doakes and Clebourne, and various locals. Machete and Mendez evade the assailants, only to be caught by a reborn Zaror and the masked mercenaries who killed Sartana. Zaror decapitates Mendez, and Machete is riddled with bullets.

Machete wakes up to find himself in a healing tank. He meets businessman and weapons inventor Luther Voz, who has preserved Mendez's beating heart in a jar. Voz shares his plan to manipulate extremists throughout the world to fire nuclear weapons at each other, to escape to an orbiting space station to rebuild society in space, and to have Machete succeed Zaror as a prototype for his army of cloned enforcers. Machete escapes the facility, meeting up with his old comrade Luz, who then refers him to Osiris, a former enemy who has since joined Luz's network and could possibly disarm the device.

Machete contacts Vasquez to update her on progress but is betrayed and ambushed at their meeting since Vasquez has sided with Voz. Machete follows her to the desert by jumping on her vehicle's rooftop but is thrown off. Machete gets a ride from El Camaleón, who tries to kill him one last time, but he escapes, leaving El Camaleón to be killed by a racist group of rednecks, including Billy from the first film, on border patrol. Machete and Luz's Network infiltrate a fundraiser at Voz's base of operations, but Voz shoots the jar and kills Osiris. Machete realizes Voz is the masked man who killed Sartana and fights him. He severely burns Voz's face, forcing him to retreat and don a metallic silver mask. Meanwhile, Vasquez shoots Luz in her good eye, completely blinding her. Luz fights and kills Vasquez, but she in turn is frozen in carbonite and captured by Voz.

While Voz and his group depart to space, Machete jumps on Mendez's missile as it launches, disarming it in mid-air, and sending it into the Rio Grande. Rathcock's forces retrieve Machete; he tells him that the other missiles have been disarmed. Learning that Voz is in space, Rathcock then asks Machete to follow them there on a SpaceX rocket.

Framing the beginning and end of the film are trailers that promote Machete Kills Again...In Space.

== Cast ==
- Danny Trejo (Note: Danny Trejo, Michelle Rodriguez, Alexa Vega, and Lady Gaga are also mentioned by name in the in-film trailer for Machete Kills Again in Space) as Machete Cortez, an ex-Federale agent who is recruited by the President of the United States to investigate Mendez
- Michelle Rodriguez as Luz, aka Shé, the leader of an illegal immigrant aid movement known as the Network; which is investigating the mysterious disappearances of migrant workers. Rodriguez reprises her role from the first film.
- Amber Heard as "Miss San Antonio" Blanca Vasquez, a beauty contestant in Texas who serves as Machete's handler for the Mendez mission.
- Sofía Vergara as Madame Desdemona, the madam of a bordello in Acapulco; she has a number of weaponized clothing articles.
- Lady Gaga as La Camaleón, one of the identities of the Chameleón.
- Vanessa Hudgens as Cereza, Desdemona's daughter. Mendez considers her his cereza, his "virgin".
- Alexa Vega as Killjoy, Desdemona's henchwoman. Although she played Carmen in the Spy Kids films, she convinced Robert Rodriguez to cast her in the film as she was no longer a kid, at 24 years old.
- Jessica Alba as Sartana Rivera in an uncredited cameo appearance.
- Mel Gibson as Luther Voz, a businessman in advanced military weapons technology.
  Voz is loosely based on entrepreneur Elon Musk; Robert Rodriguez said that he was inspired to make Voz a Star Wars junkie after having met Musk at a Hollywood party and touring Musk's SpaceX facility.
- Demián Bichir as Marcos Mendez, a revolutionary who has a split personality, believed to have a nuclear missile aimed at the United States.
- Charlie Sheen (credited under his birth name Carlos Estévez) as President Rathcock (credited as Mr. President), the American president who personally hires Machete for the mission. Expected to be a one-time move, it was Sheen's idea to use his birth name for the film, due to the film's Hispanic theme. The trailer and opening credits for the film use an "and introducing..." tag when showing Sheen's birth name.
- Walton Goggins as El Camaleón 1, one of the identities of the Chameleón.
- Cuba Gooding Jr. as El Camaleón 2, one of the identities of the Chameleón.
- Antonio Banderas as El Camaleón 4, one of the identities of the Chameleón. Banderas played the role of Machete’s younger brother Gregorio in the Spy Kids films.
- Tom Savini as Osiris Amanpour, an assassin who has since become a priest, joining Luz's Network.
- Electra and Elise Avellan, Robert Rodriguez's twin nieces, as Nurse Mona and Nurse Lisa.
- Marko Zaror as Zaror, Mendez's enforcer, an expert in martial arts.
- William Sadler as Sheriff Doakes.
- Elon Musk as himself as a cameo in the film.

== Production ==
On June 10, 2012, Rodriguez announced that principal photography for Machete Kills had begun. Principal photography took only 29 days, as shooting wrapped on July 28, 2012.

The film was produced by Robert Rodriguez, as well as Aaron Kaufman and Iliana Nikolic, through their QuickDraw Productions, Sergei Bespalov of Aldamisa Films, Alexander Rodnyansky of AR Films, and Rick Schwartz of Overnight Productions.

Lindsay Lohan, who played April Booth in the first film, did not appear in this installment. Rodriguez said that he liked Lohan's character but she "didn't fit into the story".

== Promotion ==
On October 9, 2013, Lady Gaga's Vevo released a lyric video for "Aura", a song from her third studio album Artpop, to promote the film.

== Release ==
=== Theatrical ===
Machete Kills was released theatrically in the United States on October 11, 2013, by Open Road Pictures; the film's release date was initially set for September 13, but was pushed back to avoid competition with Insidious: Chapter 2.

=== Home media ===
Machete Kills was released on DVD and Blu-ray by Universal Pictures Home Entertainment on January 21, 2014 in the United States.

== Reception ==
Rotten Tomatoes gave the film a rating of 29% based on 124 reviews, with an average of 4.6/10. The website's critical consensus reads, "While possessed with the same schlocky lunacy as its far superior predecessor, Machete Kills loses the first installment's spark in a less deftly assembled sequel." On Metacritic, which assigns a rating based on reviews from mainstream critics, the film has received a score of 41 out of 100, based on 33 critics, indicating "mixed or average reviews". Audiences polled by CinemaScore gave the film an average grade of "B−" on an A+ to F scale.

Gaga was nominated for a Golden Raspberry Award for Worst Supporting Actress for her performance, but lost to Kim Kardashian for Temptation: Confessions of a Marriage Counselor.

== Future ==
At the end of the first film's theatrical version, two sequels are mentioned, Machete Kills and Machete Kills Again. However, the trailer for a third film that precedes Kills is instead titled, Machete Kills Again... In Space and is labeled as a "Coming Attraction". In 2015, Trejo told Halloween Daily News that the third film is happening. In 2022, when asked about the progress of the project, Trejo said, "Send an email to Robert Rodriguez and tell him to stop being afraid and do it!" In 2023, Rodriguez addressed the possibility of making Machete in Space stating that "we have to do it [and] give it to them."
