= The Black Waters of Echo's Pond =

- Theatrical film poster
- Directed by: Gabriel Bologna
- Written by: Michael Berenson; Gabriel Bologna; Sean Clark
- Produced by: Raymond J. Markovich; Jason Loughbridge
- Starring: Robert Patrick; Danielle Harris; James Duval; Nick Mennell; Mircea Monroe
- Cinematography: Massimo Zeri, AIC
- Edited by: Andrew Cohen; Michael Spencer
- Music by: Harry Manfredini
- Production companies: Parallel Media; Project 8 Films
- Distributed by: Parallel Media
- Release dates: 11 October 2009 (Freak Show); 9 April 2010 (United States)
- Country: United States
- Language: English
- Budget: $5 million
- Box office: $4,224,409

The Black Waters of Echo's Pond is a 2009 fantasy horror film directed by Italo-American film maker Gabriel Bologna. It stars Robert Patrick, Danielle Harris, and James Duval.

== Plot ==
A group of friends vacation in a plush mansion, where they find a mysterious board game which draws out the nastiest qualities in all its players.

== Cast ==
- Robert Patrick as Pete
- Danielle Harris as Kathy
- Sean Lawlor as Charles
- James Duval as Rick
- Mircea Monroe as Veronique
- Nick Mennell as Josh
- Arcadiy Golubovich as Anton
- Electra Avellan as Renee
- Elise Avellan as Erica
- Walker Howard as Trent
- M.D. Walton as Robert
- Declan Joyce as Danny
- Nitsa Benchetrit as Florence
- Adamo Palladino as Niegel
- Jason Loughridge as Clint
- Steve Eoff as the butler
- Melissa Barker as the innkeeper
- Julie Stensland as the maid
- Tom Proctor as Thomas
- Richard Tyson as Nicholas
- Kurt Carley as The Pan

== Production ==
The film was shot in California (USA), at the HIP Studios (West Hollywood), Malibou Lake (Agoura Hills), Topanga Canyon and finally in Turkey. On 20 March 2010, Parallel Media released the official six-minute theatrical TV advertisement. The film is based on a screenplay by Sean Clark (the author of Bloody Disgusting), Michael Berenson and the director himself. In the lead roles, director Gabriel Bologna cast Robert Patrick, Danielle Harris, James Duval, Nick Mennell, Electra and Elise Avellan.

== Release ==
It was premiered on October 11, 2009, as part of the Freak Show Horror Film Festival at the yearly Spooky Empire horror convention. and the limited theatrical release was on April 9, 2010.

== Reception ==
On Rotten Tomatoes, the film holds an approval rating of 22% based on 18 reviews, with a weighted average rating of 3.5/10. On Metacritic, which assigns a normalized rating to reviews, the film has a weighted average score of 31 out of 100, based on seven critics, indicating "generally unfavorable reviews".

Marc Savlov from the Austin Chronicle awarded the film three out of a possible five stars, writing, "Far better (and, freakishly, more subtle) at recalling the tone and spirit of Eighties teen moviegoing than the faux-dopey slapstick of Hot Tub Time Machine, Bologna's homage to exsanguinations past is a bloody good updating of past arterial spurters." Dennis Harvey from Variety gave the film a negative review, writing, "Silly, scareless The Black Waters of Echo’s Pond finds yet another group of disposable youths unleashing yet another ancient evil something or other, to their inevitable detriment. Though this generic horror meller would be most at home debuting on Syfy — perhaps double-billed with Pinata: Survival Island".

== Soundtrack ==
The score was composed by the Italo-American jazz-soloist and film composer Harry Manfredini.
