= Surviving the Wild =

2018 film by Patrick Alessandrin

Surviving the Wild a.k.a. Riley's Peak is a 2018 American family adventure film directed by Patrick Alessandrin and written by Mark Hefti. It stars Jon Voight, Jamie Kennedy, Vail Bloom, Matt Bevin, and Aidan Cullen. It was released in select theaters across America on January 12, 2018. It was produced by Steven Paul, Patrick Alessandrin, Vail Bloom, Sweta Rai, and Michael Givens.

== Plot ==
Against the wishes of his parents (who are in the midst of a messy divorce), a young boy steals the ashes of his dead Grandfather and runs away into the wilderness with his dog. The boy is determined to fulfill his beloved Grandpa's dying wishes and spread his ashes atop a remote mountain. Along the treacherous journey, the boy and the dog are accompanied by the ghost of his Grandpa, who helps them on their journey, brings the family back together and gives the boy one last chance to say goodbye.

== Cast ==
- Jon Voight as Grandfather Gus
- Jamie Kennedy as Kristopher
- Aidan Cullen as Shaun
- Vail Bloom as Rachel
- Matt Bevin as Gus' friend

== Distributor ==
Crystal Sky Pictures, SP Releasing.
