= Double Dare (film) =

- Directed by: Amanda Micheli
- Produced by: Karen Johnson; Danielle Renfrew
- Starring: Zoë Bell; Jeannie Epper
- Edited by: Purcell Carson
- Music by: Marco D'Ambrosio
- Release date: April 15, 2004
- Running time: 81 minutes
- Country: United States
- Language: English

Double Dare is a 2004 documentary film about stuntwomen, specifically Jeannie Epper and Zoë Bell, directed by Amanda Micheli. The documentary follows Epper and Bell over several years, Epper from 1997 and Bell from the end of Xena: Warrior Princess in 2001, to 2003.

== Synopsis ==
The film begins with Bell finishing her work on Xena and Epper searching for continuing work in Hollywood despite her age, even considering liposuction before forgoing cosmetic surgery. Xena ends its run and Bell struggles with what to do next in her career. Meanwhile, Epper negotiates to have a women's category included in the Taurus World Stunt Awards (also called the World Stunt Awards). Bell is invited to the United States for a Xena convention. There she meets Epper and, obtaining a ticket with the help of the documentary crew, attends the stunt awards. Though initially receiving an offer to work on a series starring Victoria Pratt, Bell ultimately does not get the job and returns home to New Zealand.

The film resumes one year later with Bell still training, though unemployed, and planning a move to America. She stays with Epper, who is attempting to get a job working on 2 Fast 2 Furious with Terry Leonard. Epper helps Bell assemble the necessary elements for her to start her career in America, such as a CV and head shots. She also warns Bell about the deceptive nature of Hollywood, instructing her to list her weight as 130 lbs when Bell actually judges herself to weigh 145. Epper takes her to a training session, where they encounter Quentin Tarantino's stunt scout Kenny Lesco, who is looking for someone to double Uma Thurman in Kill Bill. Lesco arranges for an audition on the same day as the training session. Epper and Bell drive to Tarantino's Culver City training center for the audition, there meeting Tarantino himself as he evaluates Bell. Much to her delight, she earns the job doubling Thurman and is sent to train in Beijing with Yuen Wo Ping.

Eventually Bell begins filming for Kill Bill Vol. 1; the documentary shows her working on the fight between Beatrix Kiddo (Thurman) and O-Ren Ishii (Lucy Liu) and her bodyguards, as well as several other fight scenes. The film ends with Epper being honored by the Stuntmen's Association and Bell speaking optimistically about her future as an adult.

== Cast ==
- Jeannie Epper as herself
- Zoë Bell as herself (credited as Zoe Bell)
- Lynda Carter as herself
- Lucy Lawless as herself
- Eurlyne Epper as herself
- Ken Howard as himself
- Terry Leonard as himself
- Quentin Tarantino as himself
- Steven Spielberg as himself
- May Boss as herself
- Terry Frick as himself
- Conrad E. Palmisano as himself

== Reception ==
On review aggregator website Rotten Tomatoes, the film holds an approval rating of 97% based on 37 reviews, with an average rating of 7.5/10.

== Awards ==
- AFI Audience Award - Best Documentary - 2003
- San Francisco International Film Festival - Audience Award
- Woodstock Film Festival - Best Documentary and Best Editing
- Independent Film Festival of Boston - Jury and Audience Award
- Sonoma Valley Film Festival - Audience Award
