= Nick Mennell =

American actor (born 1976)

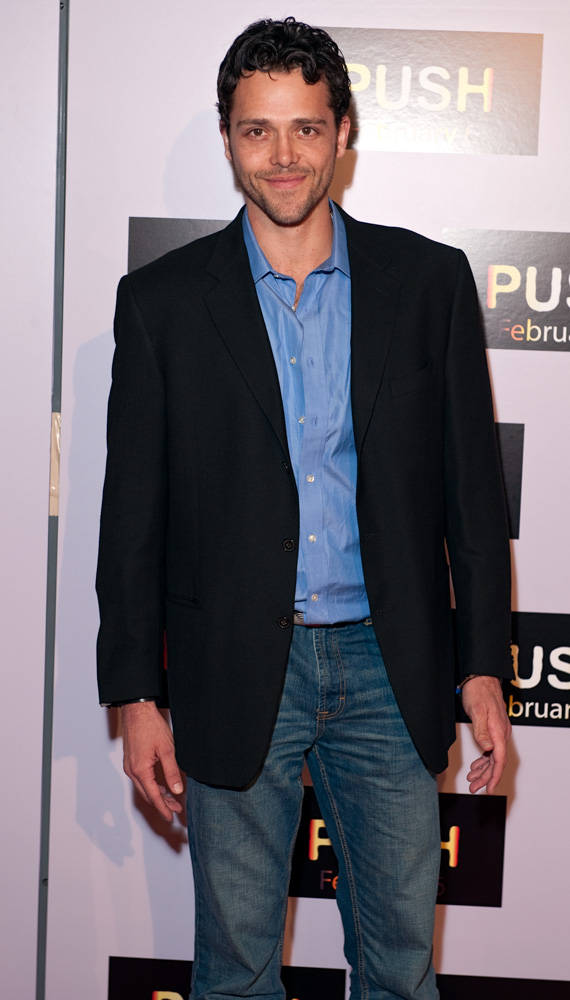
- Born: 1976 (age 48–49)
- Education: Juilliard School (BFA)
- Occupation: Actor
- Years active: 1998–present

Nick Mennell is an American actor known for his stage work as well as his roles in the horror/slasher remakes of Halloween, and Friday the 13th.

== Life and career ==
Mennell graduated from Juilliard School in 2005.

In 2007, Mennell was cast as Bob Simms, in the remake of the 1978 John Carpenter classic Halloween. The film was directed by Rob Zombie, and starred Scout Taylor-Compton, Danielle Harris, Malcolm McDowell, and Tyler Mane as Michael Myers. The film opened on August 31, 2007, and debuted at number one at the box office.

In 2008, Mennell was cast as Mike in the 2009 version of Friday the 13th and was directed by Marcus Nispel. The film also starred Amanda Righetti, Jared Padalecki, Danielle Panabaker, and Derek Mears as Jason Voorhees. The film opened on February 13, 2009, and debuted at number one at the box office. He stars also in the 2009 shot Fantasy horror film The Black Waters of Echo's Pond, which is directed by Gabriel Bologna.

== Filmography ==
Year	Film	Role	Other notes
2002	My Little Eye	The Cop	
2007	Halloween	Bob Simms	
2009	Friday the 13th	Mike	
2009	The Black Waters of Echo's Pond	Josh	
2010	The Lost Tribe	Tom	
2010	Rachel	Cowboy	short film
2013	Crystal Lake Memories: The Complete History of Friday the 13th	Himself	Documentary film
Television
Year	Title	Role	Notes
1998	Sins of the City	Steve	Episode: "Wolf Among the Flock"
2008	Numb3rs	Evan Ricci	Episode: "Scan Man"
2009	His Name Was Jason: 30 Years of Friday the 13th	Himself	Documentary film
2009-2011	Southland	Dealer	3 episodes
