= Gary Epper =

American stunt performer, coordinator and occasional actor

- Publicity Photo of Gary Epper
- Born: Gary Alan Epper; December 31, 1944; Los Angeles, California
- Died: December 1, 2007 (aged 62); Los Angeles, California
- Occupation(s): Stuntman, coordinator, actor
- Years active: 1952–1999
- Children: 5
- Parents: John Epper (father); Frances Epper (mother)
- Relatives: Jeannie Epper (sister); Tony Epper (brother)

Gary Alan Epper (December 31, 1944 – December 1, 2007) was an American stunt performer, coordinator and occasional actor. Part of a major stunt family dynasty in Hollywood, he was the son of John Epper, the brother of fellow Star Trek stuntmen Tony Epper and Andy Epper and stuntwoman Jeannie Epper. His family traces its lineage back to "a colonel in Napoleon's army" and his great-grandson, a multi-lingual Swiss who eventually lived in California where he began the family tradition in stunt work and the tradition has passed down from each generation.

Epper worked on some of the most successful Hollywood blockbuster films and television series of all time, including Lassie (1954), Hawaii Five-O (1968), Beneath the Planet of the Apes (1970), Conquest of the Planet of the Apes (1972), Magnum Force (1973), Starsky and Hutch (1975-1979), Charlie's Angels (1980-1981), Blade Runner (1982), Scarface (1983), Top Gun (1986), The Untouchables (1987), Rambo III (1988), Lethal Weapon 2 (1989), The Hunt for Red October (1990), Days of Thunder (1990), Die Hard 2 (1990), Basic Instinct (1992), Jurassic Park (1993), Demolition Man (1993), Speed (1994), L.A. Confidential (1997), The Lost World: Jurassic Park (1997), Armageddon (1998) and Wild Wild West (1999).

As an actor, he is probably best known for playing the assimilated borg Ensign Lynch in Star Trek: First Contact.

Epper died on December 1, 2007, at age 62 in Los Angeles. Epper had five children, Lisa, Danielle, Gary, Madison and Nicole, and five grandchildren, Brie, Skyler, Emma, Maggie and Kate.

== Filmography ==
Year	Title	Role	Notes
1959	Westbound	Boy at Stagecoach Accident	Uncredited
1965	Shenandoah	Church Member	Uncredited
1972	The Cowboys	Rustler	
1975	Doc Savage: The Man of Bronze	Hood	Uncredited
1988	The Seventh Sign	Jimmy's Guard	
1990	Captain America	Mr. Erlich	
1991	V.I. Warshawski	Thug #2	
1991	Hook	Growling Pirate	
1993	Father Hood	Trucker	
1995	3 Ninjas Knuckle Up	Biker #1	
1996	Broken Arrow	Miller	(final film role)
