= Jeannie Epper =

American stuntwoman and actress (1941–2024)

- Epper in 2007
- Born: Jean Luann Epper; January 27, 1941; Glendale, California, U.S.
- Died: May 5, 2024 (aged 83); Simi Valley, California, U.S.
- Occupations: Stuntwoman, actress
- Years active: 1951–2019
- Known for: Wonder Woman; Charlie's Angels; The Bionic Woman; Romancing the Stone
- Spouses: Wes Fuller (divorced); Richard Spaethe (divorced); Lee Sanders (divorced); Tim Kimack
- Children: 3
- Relatives: John Epper (father); Tony Epper (brother); Gary Epper (brother)

Jean Luann Epper (January 27, 1941 – May 5, 2024) was an American stuntwoman and actress. She performed stunts in over 100 feature films and television series and is perhaps best known as Lynda Carter's stunt double on the 1970s television series Wonder Woman. She was featured in Amanda Micheli's 2004 documentary Double Dare, along with New Zealand stuntwoman and actress Zoë Bell. Entertainment Weekly noted that many consider her "the greatest stuntwoman who's ever lived."

Her acting roles included appearances in The Life and Times of Judge Roy Bean (1972), Foxy Brown (1974), Switchblade Sisters (1975), Drum (1976), Supernatural (2006), Beverly Hills Cop III (1994), Kill Bill: Volume 2 (2004), and Quarantine (2008).

== Early life ==
Jean Luann "Jeannie" Epper was born in Glendale, California, on January 27, 1941, to professional stunt performers John and Frances Epper. John had immigrated to the United States from Switzerland during the 1920s; Jeannie later spent part of her childhood at finishing school in Switzerland, though she "hated" the experience. After establishing a riding academy in Los Angeles, John Epper built a career as a stuntman specializing in horseback stunts. Jeannie Epper began learning stunt work from her father at the age of nine, and she became one of the first professional child stunt doubles. Her family traces its lineage back to "a colonel in Napoleon's army".

== Career ==
Although it was initially challenging for Epper to find work, as men had traditionally done the stunt work for many actresses, the industry began to open up to more women in the 1970s, and Epper made her breakthrough with regular stunt double work for Lynda Carter on Wonder Woman (1975–1979), Lindsay Wagner on The Bionic Woman (1976–1978) and Kate Jackson on Charlie's Angels (1976). Epper's subsequent stunt work included the film Romancing the Stone (1984), for which she received the 1985 Annual Stuntman Award for Most Spectacular Stunt (Feature Film). In the early 21st century, Epper performed stunts in Catch Me If You Can (2002), Minority Report (2002), and Kill Bill: Vol. 2 (2004).

Epper was a founding member of the Stuntwomen's Association of Motion Pictures in 1968, and in 1999 she served as its president. She was an honorary member of the Stuntmen's Association of Motion Pictures.

In May 2007, Epper received a lifetime achievement award from the Taurus World Stunt Awards, becoming the first woman selected for the honor. She continued to work as a stunt performer into her seventies, with later work including the film Hot Pursuit (2015). It is estimated that Epper has completed up to 150 stunts for film and television over the course of her career. Her final acting role was on an episode of The Rookie in 2019.

== Personal life ==
Beginning when she was sixteen, Epper was married four times; her first three marriages, to Wes Fuller, Richard Spaethe, and Lee Sanders, ended in divorce. Her fourth marriage, Tim Kimack, lasted until her death. She had three children, one of whom predeceased her. All of her children also followed her into stunt work.

In 2000, she donated a kidney to family friend Ken Howard, with whose wife Linda she had worked in the stunt community.

== Death ==
After a period of declining health, Epper died from complications of an infection at her home in Simi Valley, California, on May 5, 2024, at the age of 83. She was cremated at Hollywood Forever Cemetery.

== Filmography ==
=== Film ===
Year	Title	Role	Notes
1951	Elopement	Reagan Girl	Uncredited
1964	Cheyenne Autumn	Entertainer	Uncredited
1969	Hello Dolly	Float Girl	Uncredited
1972	The Life and Times of Judge Roy Bean	Whore	
1973	Soylent Green	Woman Picked Up by Scoop	Uncredited
1974	Foxy Brown	Bobbie	
1974	Earthquake	Blonde Woman Fleeing Theater · Blonde Woman in Elevator	Uncredited
1975	Switchblade Sisters	Matron #1	
1976	Drum	Woman Guest #2 (as Jean Epper)	
1976	Silver Streak	Running Woman in Train Station	Uncredited
1985	Fletch	Basketball Spectator	Uncredited
1985	Warning Sign	Woman on Video Screen	
1986	The Gladiator	Woman in Truck (uncredited)	TV Movie
1990	Total Recall	Restaurant Patron	Uncredited
1990	Don't Tell Her It's Me	Woman Thug	
1991	The Naked Gun 2½: The Smell of Fear	Gala Guest	Uncredited
1992	The Mighty Ducks	Woman in Mall (uncredited)	a.k.a. Champions
1994	Beverly Hills Cop III	Spider Rider	
1994	A Dangerous Place	Old Woman	
1995	Die Hard with a Vengeance	Woman at Subway Station	Uncredited
2002	Spider-Man	Board of Directors Member	Uncredited
2002	Men in Black II	Subway Passenger	Uncredited
2004	Kill Bill: Volume 2	Mrs. Harmony	
2004	I Heart Huckabees	Lady in Gown (as Jeannie Epper-Kimack)	
2004	Legacy	Old Lady	
2005	Fun with Dick and Jane	Gym Class Attendee	Uncredited
2008	Evilution	Mrs. Harris (as Jeannie Epper-Kimack)	
2008	Quarantine	Ms. Espinoza	
2013	Epic Chick Fight	Dianna Prince	Short
2015	Hot Pursuit	Senior Tour Passenger Closest to Cooper	Uncredited
2015	Made for Each Other	Old Lady	Short

=== Television ===
Year	Title	Role	Notes
1973	Medical Center	Girl #2 (as Jean Eppers)	Season 4 Episode 16: "Question of Guilt"
1977	Man from Atlantis	Bar Waitress (uncredited)	Season 1 Episode 8: "Giant"
1979	Laverne & Shirley	Red Team	Season 5 Episode 9: "We're in the Army, Now: Part 1"
1990	Tales from the Crypt	Ada Ritter	Season 2 Episode 16: "Television Terror"
2001	The Amanda Show		Season 2 Episode 17: "Episode #2.17"
2002	Charmed	Elderly Woman	Season 5 Episode 5: "Witches in Tights"
2005	Monk	Gladys	Season 4 Episode 8: "Mr. Monk and Little Monk"
2006	Supernatural	The Shtriga	Season 1 Episode 18: "Something Wicked"
2009	Eleventh Hour	Mrs. Friedman	Season 1 Episode 10: "H2O"
2009	Criminal Minds	Bus Passenger (uncredited) / Pharmacy Customer (uncredited)	2 episodes
2019	The Rookie	Aunt Sallie	Season 1 Episode 15: "Manhunt"
