= Brian Poth =

American actor (born 1975)

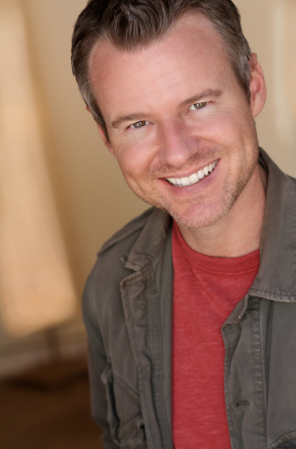
- Poth in 2012
- Born: June 9, 1975 (age 50); Tulare, California
- Occupation: Actor/Writer/Director/Activist

Brian Poth (born June 9, 1975) is an American actor.

== Biography ==
Poth got his start as a dancer on the show Kids Incorporated having to commute to Los Angeles every week. After his contract was up, he moved to LA to get a screen writing and film production degree from Loyola Marymount University. After graduating in 1997, he promptly won a guest starring role in Six Feet Under.

In 2003, Poth was cast in his first major role on TV, appearing for 30 episodes on CSI: Miami as multimedia lab tech Tyler Jensen. In 2010 he made his directorial debut with co-writer and co-director Elizabeth Beckwith in the musical comedy short Gleeclipse starring Linda Cardellini spoofing Jane Lynch's character from Glee. Poth recently finished production on his freshman effort sitcom pilot Family Style, written with director and creator Guy Shalem.

As of May 2016, Poth is the Executive Director of The Source LGBT+ Center in Visalia, California.

== Filmography ==
- Castle - Oscar Von Eckland (2016)
  - Hell to Pay
- Criminal Minds - Peter Folkmore (2015)
  - Scream
- Aquarius - Chris (2015)
  - Your Mother Should Know
  - Cease to Resist
- Bones - Jeremy Walford (2014)
  - The Lost Love in the Foreign Land
- True Blood - Matt (2013-2014)
  - Don't You Feel Me
  - Jesus Gonna Be Here
  - Fire in the Hole
- Grey's Anatomy - Hook Line and Sinner - Keith (2010)
- Angel of Death - Graham (2009)
- Saving Grace - What Would You Do - Russell Tupton (2009)
- CSI: New York - Sex Lies and Silicone - Hank Gorem (2008)
- Prison Break - "Blow Out" - Brian Anderson (2008)
- Cold Case - Justice - Jimmy Bartram (2007)
- Crossing Jordan - Greg Hewitt (2006)
- CSI: Miami - Tyler Jenson (2003–2005) 30 Episodes
- The West Wing - Access - Eric Schaeffer (2004)
- The X-Files - "Scary Monsters" - Gabe Rotter (2002)
- Six Feet Under - Marc Foster (2001)
  - A Private Life
  - Knock, Knock
- Judging Amy - Nick Dobson (2000)
  - Waterworld
  - The Out-of-Towners
- La Femme Nikita - Time to be Heroes - Patrick 'Darwin' Donoghue (2000)
- Buffy the Vampire Slayer - I Only Have Eyes for You - Fighting Boy (1998)
- Kids Incorporated - Brian (dancer) (1987–1989)
- Mr. Belvedere - The Play - Vincent (1986)
- Production Assistant on Kids Incorporated during the final 2 seasons.

== Articles ==
Brian Poth on Six Feet Under Entertainment Weekly at EW.com "Embalms Away"
