= Zoë Bell =

New Zealand actress and stuntwoman (born 1978)

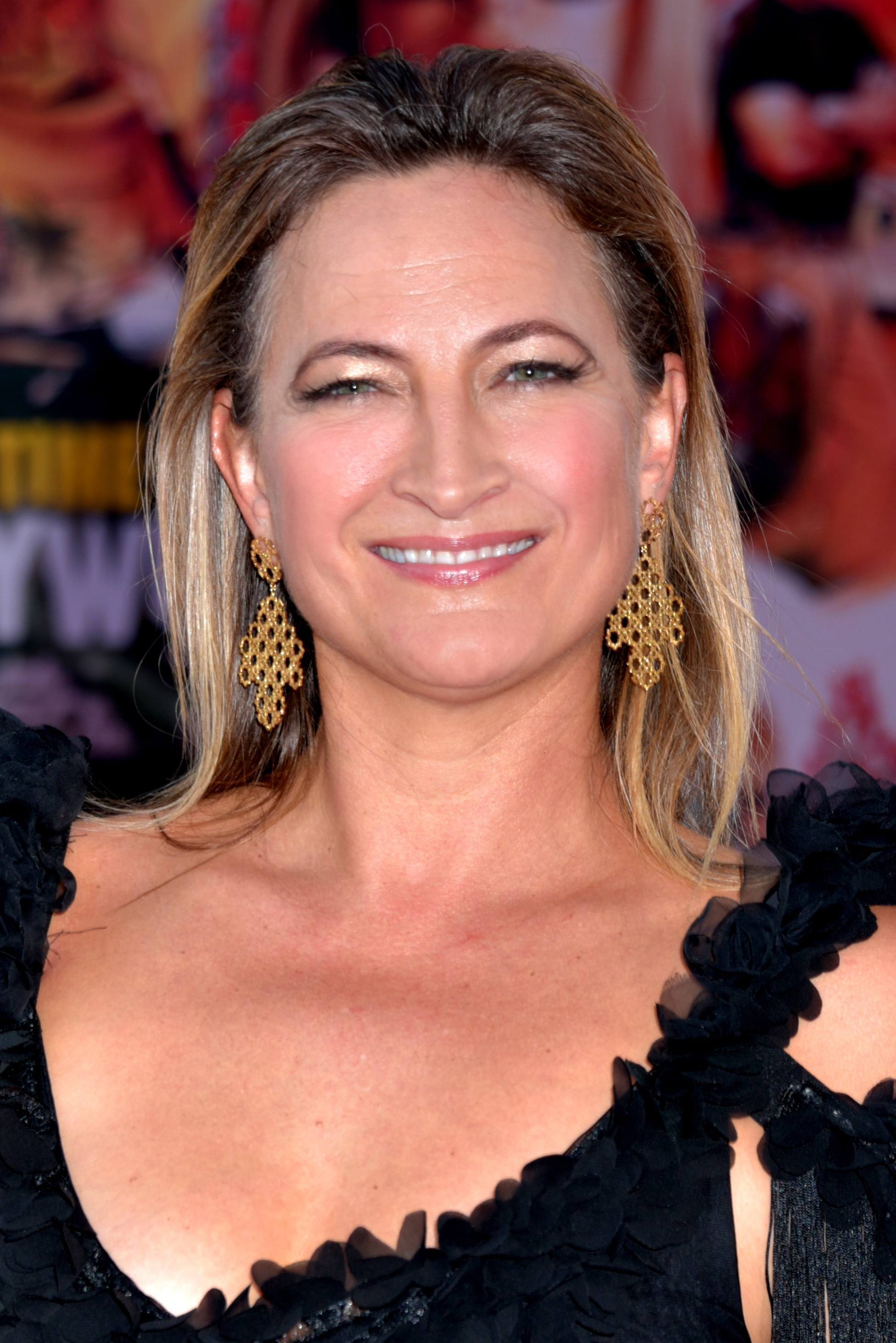
- Bell in 2019
- Born: Zoë E. Bell; 17 November 1978 (age 48); Waiheke Island, New Zealand
- Occupations: Actress; stuntwoman; stunt coordinator
- Years active: 1992–present

Zoë E. Bell (born 17 November 1978) is a New Zealand stuntwoman and actress. Some of her most notable stunt work includes doubling for Lucy Lawless in Xena: Warrior Princess and for Uma Thurman in Kill Bill.

As an actress, Bell has appeared on television and in feature films; she starred in the web series Angel of Death. She is best known for playing herself in the Quentin Tarantino film Death Proof. In 2015, she appeared in an acting role in Tarantino's film The Hateful Eight, and in 2019, she appeared in an acting role in Tarantino's Once Upon a Time in Hollywood, in addition to her role as stunt coordinator and stuntwoman.

She was Cate Blanchett's stunt double in the 2017 release Thor: Ragnarok.

== Early life ==
Bell was born on Waiheke Island, New Zealand, to Tish, a nurse, and Andrew Bell, a doctor. She has a younger brother named Jake and a foster brother named Leonhard, who is living in his old hometown in Germany. She grew up on Waiheke Island in Auckland.

At an early age, Bell participated in competitive gymnastics and at 15 began studying Taekwondo. She also participated in dance, high diving, scuba diving, and track and field. Bell attended Auckland Girls' Grammar School and Selwyn College.

== Career ==
Bell began her career in 1992 when her father treated a stuntman for a head injury and came home with a phone number for her to call. Her first stunt job was jumping out of a car in Shortland Street, a New Zealand soap opera.

She performed stunts for Hercules: The Legendary Journeys and Xena: Warrior Princess, both of which were filmed in New Zealand; by the fourth season of Xena, she was the stunt double for Lucy Lawless. She fractured vertebrae in her back doing wire work stunts on the show, but continued working for a week until another stunt, in which a breakaway chair was smashed on her back, incapacitated her.

After Xena, she worked on small films and TV, including stunt co-ordinating and playing a small role in the short film Reflections with Adrienne Wilkinson (with whom she had previously worked on Xena). She later doubled for Uma Thurman in Quentin Tarantino's Kill Bill.

Though she was initially hired as Thurman's "crash and smash" double, the stunt team realized Bell would also make an ideal double for fight-scenes and she was trained accordingly. Bell had to learn to fight in the wushu style. Near the end of filming for Kill Bill: Volume 2, she injured her ribs and the ligaments in her wrist while simulating being thrown backward by a shotgun blast. Bell required surgery and spent several months recuperating. After production finished on Kill Bill, she received "The Bells" sign which hung outside the home of the Vernita Green character. She later gave it to her parents. She later returned as Thurman's stunt double in 2025 for the Fortnite animated short film, The Lost Chapter: Yuki's Revenge, based on a cut section of the original Kill Bill script.

After both Kill Bill movies, she did stunt work for Catwoman, performing high falls and acting as a double for Sharon Stone.

In 2004, the documentary Double Dare was released. It focused primarily on Bell and veteran stuntwoman Jeannie Epper, following them as they traveled in Hollywood. The film presented opposing ends of the stuntwoman spectrum: the aging Epper continuing her search for work in an industry where age is not necessarily an asset, and Bell, then a Hollywood newcomer, trying to break into the industry. The filming of Double Dare covered Bell's career from the end of Xena to the beginning of her work on Kill Bill: Volume 1.

In 2004, Bell and Angela Meryl (Vivica A. Fox's stunt double) were nominated at the Taurus World Stunt Awards in the categories "Best Overall Stunt by a Woman" and "Best Fight" for their doubling of the knife fight between the characters Beatrix Kiddo and Vernita Green in Kill Bill: Volume 1. In 2005, Bell was nominated for a Taurus in the categories "Best Overall Stunt by a Woman", "Best Fight" and "Best High Work". She and Monica Staggs (Daryl Hannah's double) won Best Overall Stunt and Best Fight for their fight in Budd's trailer in Kill Bill: Volume 2. Her Best High Work nomination was for a fall of over 200 feet in the film Catwoman.

After Catwoman, Bell performed stunts in the action thriller The Kingdom and another Tarantino film, Inglourious Basterds.

Tarantino cast her in a leading role in his next film, Death Proof (2007), in which she played herself and performed her own stunts, the most notable of which occurred when she clung to the hood of a speeding 1970 Dodge Challenger.

In August 2007, Bell said she had signed to play the lead role in a film about an American soldier who, upon returning to the U.S. from a tour of duty in Iraq, helps a young girl in trouble. She said she would do her own stunts in the film, and that the American accent was "a big challenge".

Bell appeared in episode seven of the fourth season of Lost, playing the freighter team's radio contact, Regina. She said that the role required a little acting and some stunt work.

In 2008, Bell starred alongside her former Xena colleague Lucy Lawless in Sony (Crackle)'s web series Angel of Death which debuted online in early 2009.

Bell also played a medical technician who moonlights as "Bloody Holly", a roller derby star, in Drew Barrymore's 2009 directorial debut, Whip It.

She appeared alongside Wesley Snipes in the Italian director Giorgio Serafini's 2010 thriller, Game of Death. She can also be seen in the music video of Noel Gallagher's High Flying Birds' 2012 single "Dream On".

Bell signed with CAA in August 2020.

== Filmography ==
Year	Title	Actress	Stunts	Role	Notes
1992–2005	Shortland Street	No	Yes		
1995–1999	Hercules: The Legendary Journeys	No	Yes		
1998	The Chosen	No	Yes		
1998	Young Hercules				
1998–2001	Xena: Warrior Princess	No	Yes	Xena	Main actress: Lucy Lawless
1999	Jacksons Wharf				
1999	Amazon High	No	Yes		
2000	Jack of All Trades				
2000	Cleopatra 2525	Yes	No	Female Betrayer	
2002	The Bunker Murders				
2003	Riverworld	No	Yes		
2003	The Extreme Team (a.k.a. The X-Team)	No	Yes		
2003	Kill Bill: Volume 1	No	Yes	The Bride	Main actress: Uma Thurman
2004	Kill Bill: Volume 2	No	Yes	The Bride	Main actress: Uma Thurman
2004	Catwoman	No	Yes	Laurel Hedare	Main actress: Sharon Stone
2004	Double Dare	Yes	No	Herself	
2005	Alias	No	Yes	Kelly Peyton	Main actress: Amy Acker
2006	Devil's Den	No	Yes		
2006	Poseidon	No	Yes		
2006	Penny Dreadful	No	Yes		
2007	Grindhouse	Yes	Yes	Sicko Eating Paramedic #2	Segment: Planet Terror
2007	Grindhouse	Yes	Yes	Herself	Segment: Death Proof
2007	The Kingdom	No	Yes		
2008	Lost	Yes	Yes	Regina	4 episodes
2008	Reflections	Yes	Yes	Woman in Mirror	stunt coordinator
2009	The Chronicles of Nerm	Yes	No		voice
2009	The Collector	No	Yes		
2009	Bitch Slap	Yes	Yes	Rawhide	Stunt coordinator; fight choreographer
2009	Angel of Death	Yes	No	Eve	
2009	Gamer	Yes	No	Sandra	
2009	Whip It	Yes	No	Bloody Holly	
2009	Inglourious Basterds	No	Yes	Shosanna	Main actress: Mélanie Laurent
2009	Inglourious Basterds	No	Yes	Bridget von Hammersmark	Main actress: Diane Kruger
2009	The Proposal	No	Yes	Margaret	Main actress: Sandra Bullock
2009	The Final Destination	No	Yes		
2010	Fallout: New Vegas	Yes	No	Melissa / Diane / Linda Schuler / Alice Hostetler	Video game voice-over
2010	Game of Death	Yes	No	Floria	
2011	Gossip Girl	Yes	No	Herself	
2012	The Baytown Outlaws	Yes	No	Rose	
2012	Django Unchained	Yes	No	Tracker	
2013	Hansel and Gretel: Witch Hunters	Yes	No	Tall Witch	
2013	Oblivion	Yes	No	Kara	
2013	Iron Man 3	No	Yes		
2013	Raze	Yes	No	Sabrina	
2013	Hawaii Five-0	Yes	Yes	Dr. Shannon Morgan (Sugar Sticks)	
2014	Mercenaries	Yes	No	Cassandra Clay	
2015	The Hateful Eight	Yes	No	Six-Horse Judy	
2015	Camino	Yes	No	Avery Taggert	
2016	Paradox	Yes	Yes	Gale	
2016	Freshwater	Yes	Yes	Brenda Grey	
2017	Thor: Ragnarok	No	Yes	Hela	Main actress: Cate Blanchett
2019	Once Upon a Time in Hollywood	Yes	Yes	Janet Lloyd	Stunt Coordinator
2019	QT8: The First Eight	Yes	No	Herself	Documentary
2021	Malignant	Yes		Scorpion	

== Awards and nominations ==
Year	Event	Film	Award	Result
2009	Maverick Movie Awards	Reflections	Best Stunts	Won
2008	Screen Actors Guild Awards	The Kingdom	Outstanding Performance by a Stunt Ensemble in a Motion Picture	Nominated
2008	World Stunt Awards	Grindhouse	Best Overall Stunt by a Stunt Woman	Won
2008	World Stunt Awards	Grindhouse	Best Work With a Vehicle	Nominated
2005	World Stunt Awards	Kill Bill: Volume 2	Best Overall Stunt by a Stunt Woman	Won
2005	World Stunt Awards	Kill Bill: Volume 2	Best Fight	Won
2005	Women in Film and Television New Zealand Awards		Achievement in Film	Won
2005	World Stunt Awards	Catwoman	Best High Work	Nominated
2004	World Stunt Awards	Kill Bill: Volume 1	Best Overall Stunt by a Stunt Woman	Nominated
2004	World Stunt Awards	Kill Bill: Volume 1	Best Fight	Nominated
