= Too Late (2015 film) =

Film by Dennis Hauck

- Theatrical release poster
- Directed by: Dennis Hauck
- Written by: Dennis Hauck
- Produced by: Alexandra Barreto; Taylor Feltner; Dennis Hauck; Erich Lochner; Matt Miller
- Starring: John Hawkes; Vail Bloom; Joanna Cassidy; Jeff Fahey; Robert Forster; Brett Jacobsen; Dichen Lachman; Dash Mihok; Sydney Tamiia Poitier; Crystal Reed; Rider Strong; Natalie Zea
- Cinematography: Bill Fernandez
- Edited by: David Heinz
- Music by: Robert Allaire
- Production company: Foe Killer Films
- Distributed by: Vanishing Angle
- Release dates: June 11, 2015 (LA Film Festival); March 18, 2016 (United States); August 10, 2016 (Streaming)
- Running time: 107 minutes
- Country: United States
- Language: English
- Box office: $60,438

Too Late is a 2015 American neo-noir crime drama film written and directed by Dennis Hauck. The film was shot in 35 mm Techniscope in five long takes, each filmed with a single 20-minute uncut shot. In the film, a private investigator (John Hawkes) scours the streets of Los Angeles to track down a missing woman from his past. He then finds himself tangled up in a sleazy scandal involving strip clubs, petty drug dealers, and missing girls.

The film premiered at the LA Film Festival on June 11, 2015. It opened in theaters in Los Angeles on March 18, 2016, and in New York City on April 1, before expanding to Alamo Drafthouse cinemas nationwide.

== Plot ==
A young girl, Dorothy Mahler, is hiking on a nature trail near to downtown Los Angeles when two dimwitted street dealers, Jesse and Mathew, turn up by chance. She borrows the phone of one and calls Mel Samson, a private investigator, whom she had met earlier, saying she needs his help because some bad guys in the city are angry with her. While waiting for Samson to arrive, Dorothy takes ecstasy given to her by the dealers, who have to go but promise to come back for her later. Dorothy begins talking to Skippy Fontaine, a seemingly friendly park ranger. Dorothy and Fontaine chat until we see that there is a dead body nearby. Suddenly Fontaine attacks Dorothy and strangles her. The returning Jesse and Matthew come across her body and believe that she overdosed on the drugs they gave her, and they run away in fear. Samson arrives, too late, to find Dorothy dead.

In the second segment, Samson arrives at the home of sleazy strip club owner Gordy, saying he's been in a car accident and needs to use their phone. He speaks with Gordy's much-younger, neglected wife, Janet, and has a drink. When Samson eventually comes face to face with Gordy and Roger Fontaine, Skippy's father, he reveals his real identity and tells them the motivation for Dorothy's murder: Dorothy had photographs of Gordy receiving oral sex from another stripper, and Gordy arranged Dorothy's murder to keep Janet from finding out. Janet is incensed by Samson's story of her husband's infidelity and retrieves a gun. Provoked by Samson, she shoots Gordy and Roger dead, before (despite Samson's protests) turning the gun on herself. Samson remarks to himself that he needs to get his life together.

The third segment shows what would have been first chronologically. Samson sits in a strip club and is offered a lap dance from a performer named Jill, which he declines. He meets Dorothy and asks her to get a drink with him but she diverts him and leaves without him noticing. Samson goes to a neighboring club where a friend's band is performing live music. He finds Dorothy waiting for him and she joins him in a photo booth. He plays guitar and performs a song.

The fourth segment shows what would have been last chronologically. Jill is working at a drive-in movie theater, where she's approached by Samson, who has a non-deadly bullet wound in his chest. They discuss their year-long romantic relationship, which ended some time earlier. Samson reveals that he's come to the theater to confront one of its patrons, Fontaine. He gets into Fontaine's car and points a gun at him but Fontaine manages to stab him in the abdomen with a broken bottle and escape. Jill joins Samson in the car and holds him as he dies. He shows her the "Jilly Bean" tattoo he got in her honor.

In the final segment, Samson goes to see Dorothy's grandmother and mother about taking her case, but he insists on doing it at no cost, out of loyalty to Dorothy. Speaking privately to Dorothy's mother, Mary, Samson reminds her through an allegory that they had had a relationship many years earlier, revealing that Samson is Dorothy's father and had watched her grow up from a distance her whole life. Walking to his car, Samson is attacked and shot in the chest by Jesse and Matthew, who believe Dorothy died from the drugs they gave her and don't want to be implicated in Samson's investigation. They flee, and Samson gets into his car with painful but survivable injuries. Energized by glancing at the photos he and Dorothy took in the photo booth the night they met, he starts his car and drives off.

== Awards & Nominations ==
Award	Year	Category	Recipient	Result	Ref.
Oldenburg Film Festival	2015	Best Film	Dennis Hauck	Nominated	
Los Angeles Film Festival	2015	US Fiction Award	Dennis Hauck	Nominated	
Twin Cities Film Fest, US	2015	Breakthrough Achievement Award	Dennis Hauck	Winner	
Hollywood Music In Media Awards (HMMA)	2016	Best Original Song "Down With Mary"	John Hawkes	Nominated	

== Cast ==
- Crystal Reed as Dorothy Mahler
- John Hawkes as Samson
- Vail Bloom as Janet Lyons
- Jeff Fahey as Roger
- Natalie Zea as Mary Mahler
- Joanna Cassidy as Eleanor Mahler
- Robert Forster as Gordy Lyons
- Brett Jacobsen as Fontaine
- Dichen Lachman as Jilly Bean
- Dash Mihok as Jesse
- Sydney Tamiia Poitier as Veronica
- Rider Strong as Matthew
- David Yow as Arthur

== Reception ==
On the review aggregator website Rotten Tomatoes, the film holds an approval rating of 71% based on 34 reviews, with an average rating of 5.7/10. The website's critics consensus reads, "Too Late pays homage to its genre inspirations affectionately enough to beg forgiveness for relying on them so heavily." Metacritic, which uses a weighted average, assigned the film a score of 54 out of 100, based on 14 critics, indicating "mixed or average" reviews.

Ken Jaworowski of The New York Times praised the film, writing "Mr. Hauck's affection is apparent in every frame, yet outside of an occasionally clunky line or show-offy moment (O.K., sometimes it's more occasional than just occasionally), he rarely allows it to alter his aim. That aim is to make a modern noir. That aim is true."

Gary Goldstein of the Los Angeles Times wrote: "Hauck, with a strong assist from Bill Fernandez's clever, well-modulated Techniscope lensing, impressively choreographs the movie's continuous takes with a nice balance of intimacy and breadth. Hauck's a talent to watch."

Dennis Harvey of Variety magazine called it "a supremely self-conscious genre exercise" but praised Hawkes for his performance: "As a spiritually "lost" man searching for a more literally lost woman, Hawkes has just the offhand gravitas required for a noir hero. Yet in a movie where character backstory and plot coherence hardly figure, any emotional realism the actor provides is wholly his invention."

Sheri Linden of The Hollywood Reporter wrote: "With its overt nods to movies, nonlinear structure and purple-tinged dialogue, the self-conscious artifice of Hauck's first feature can be suffocating. This narrative puzzle should be more fun than it is."
