= Angel of Death (web series) =

Web series created by Ed Brubaker

- Genre: Action
- Created by: Ed Brubaker
- Directed by: Paul Etheredge
- Starring: Zoë Bell; Lucy Lawless; Doug Jones; Vail Bloom; Ted Raimi; Brian Poth; Justin Huen; Jake Abel
- Country of origin: United States
- Original language: English
- No. of seasons: 1
- No. of episodes: 10

Production
- Producer: John Norris
- Running time: 8-10 minutes

Original release
- Network: Crackle
- Release: March 2 – March 13, 2009

Angel of Death is an action web series created by Ed Brubaker. The series stars Zoë Bell as Eve, an assassin taking revenge on her former employers. The series also features Lucy Lawless. It is produced by White Rock Lake Production and distributed by Sony Pictures Television.

The episodes were released on Crackle from March 2 to March 13, 2009.

== Plot ==
The show is a thriller about the assassin, Eve, who is employed by a ruthless crime family. After suffering a severe head trauma (knife through her head) while on the job, she begins to hallucinate and becomes haunted by her victims. As a result of her injury, Eve is driven to seek revenge on those who ordered the hits in the first place—her mob employers.

== History ==
While developing the story about a cold-blooded killer growing a conscience, Brubaker's original idea for the series was a hitman afflicted with brain cancer, but then remembered watching a scene in an old PBS documentary series where a patient walked into the ER with a hunting knife stabbed right through his skull, and drew inspiration from that for Eve's head injury. Angel of Death is Brubaker's first online series.

The show reunites Lucy Lawless, Ted Raimi, and Zoë Bell - who all worked together on Xena: Warrior Princess. Bell was Lawless's stunt-double on the long-running series.

== Other formats ==
Once the show finished its original online broadcast, it was released on DVD, with new footage. The DVD was going to be released in June 2009, but instead ended up being released on July 28, 2009.

A feature-length compilation of the web series was broadcast on Spike TV and was available for viewing on Hulu until 2017.

== Cast ==
- Zoë Bell: Eve, the assassin.
- Lucy Lawless: Vera, Eve's next-door neighbor.
- Doug Jones: Dr. Rankin, who helps Eve after her head trauma.
- Vail Bloom: Regina Downes
- Ted Raimi: Jed Norton
- Brian Poth: Graham Prescott
- Justin Huen: Franklin
- Jake Abel: Cameron Downes
- Monica Staggs: The Madame

== Episodes ==
No.	Title	Original release date
1	"Edge"	March 2, 2009
The viewers are introduced to Eve, who winds up in a bad way after a botched job.
2	"Conscious"	March 9, 2009
Eve visits Dr. Rankin (Doug Jones), hoping he can extract the knife from her skull.
3	"Workday"	March 30, 2009
Eve goes back to work, helping to take out Jed Norton (Ted Raimi), but can't quite keep it together with her visions.
4	"Made Man"	April 6, 2009
In an effort to make her visions go away, Eve pays Arthur Max a violent visit.
5	"Escape"	April 27, 2009
After getting trapped in Max's office, Eve must fight her way out.
6	"Help"	May 11, 2009
Eve ends up in the care of Vera (Lucy Lawless) while her rivals try to get a handle on the situation.
7	"Old Man"	June 1, 2009
Going after the big boss, Eve only finds a sick old man and his weeping daughter, Regina Downes (Vail Bloom).
8	"Innocent"	June 8, 2009
Graham (Brian Poth) has figured a way out for him and Eve. But Regina makes sure her brother Cameron (Jake Abel) puts a stop to that.
9	"The Hunt"	June 15, 2009
Finding both Graham and Vera dead, Eve moves in for the kill at the big boss' funeral, which the Downes siblings are attending, along with her old protégé Franklin.
10	"Absolution"	June 22, 2009
Bursting into the funeral puts Eve at risk, but it is one she's willing to risk to avenge Graham's death.
