= Tony Epper =

American actor

- Publicity Photo of Tony Epper
- Born: October 1, 1938; Los Angeles, California
- Died: July 20, 2012 (aged 73); Salmon, Idaho
- Occupation(s): Actor, stuntman
- Years active: 1951–1996
- Spouse(s): Donna Epper (m. ?–2012; his death)
- Children: 4
- Parents: John Epper (father); Frances Epper (mother)
- Relatives: Jeannie Epper (sister); Gary Epper (brother)

John Anthony Epper (October 1, 1938 – July 20, 2012) was an American actor and stuntman. He was a member of the Epper family, whose members work as actors and stunt performers. Members include his sister, stuntwoman Jeannie Epper, and his brothers, Gary Epper and Andy Epper.

Epper, the son of stuntman John Epper, was born in Los Angeles, California. He began his stunt and acting career in the 1950s, performing as an uncredited actor in Carbine Williams in 1952, The Story of Will Rogers in 1952 and Ma and Pa Kettle at Home in 1954.

Epper alternated between stunt working and acting roles throughout his career. His stunt credits included Bram Stoker's Dracula, Con Air, Thelma & Louise, Jingle All the Way, Lethal Weapon 2, and Patriot Games. In addition to stunt work, Epper acted in numerous films including The Cowboys, Dick Tracy, The Beastmaster, Valdez Is Coming, National Lampoon's Christmas Vacation, The Scalphunters, Cutter's Way, and The Hitcher.

Epper's television work began in 1958 when he appeared in an episode of the sitcom Bachelor Father. He appeared in more than a dozen television series, including Batman, Charlie's Angels, MacGyver, and The A-Team. His last television role occurred in 1996, when he portrayed an inebriated Klingon in an episode of Star Trek: Deep Space Nine.

== Personal life ==
Epper and his wife, Donna, had four children together: stuntman and actor Danny Epper; and three daughters, Traci, Rona and Casey.

Epper died from cancer at his Idaho home on July 20, 2012, at the age of 73.

== Filmography ==
Year	Title	Role	Notes
1951	Elopement	Reagan Boy	Uncredited
1952	Carbine Williams	Wesley Williams	Uncredited
1954	Ma and Pa Kettle at Home	Donny Kettle	Uncredited
1964	Mail Order Bride	Cowboy	Uncredited
1968	The Scalphunters	Scalphunter	
1969	The Gay Deceivers	Vince	
1969	Paint Your Wagon	Miner	Uncredited
1971	Valdez Is Coming	Bodyguard	
1972	The Cowboys	Rustler #5	
1972	The Great Northfield Minnesota Raid	Lumberjack	Uncredited
1972	Ulzana's Raid	Trooper #5	
1977	Bad Georgia Road	Jessie	
1979	Buck Rogers in the 25th Century	Drunk	
1981	Cutter's Way	Guard #2	
1982	The Beastmaster	Jun Leader	
1984	The Wild Life	Redneck Drunk #1	
1985	Runaway Train	Hitman	
1986	The Hitcher	Trooper Conners	
1986	Hamburger: The Motion Picture	Biker Gang Leader	
1986	Bad Guys	Biker in Bar	Uncredited
1987	Outrageous Fortune	Russell	
1987	Shy People	Jake	
1988	Alien from L.A.	Terminating Hood	
1989	Homer and Eddie	Gas Station Attendant	
1989	National Lampoon's Christmas Vacation	Bozo #1	
1990	Dick Tracy	Steve the Tramp	
1990	Don't Tell Her It's Me	Gas Station Thug	
1990	Kid	Truck	
1991	Suburban Commando	Teeth	
1992	Freejack	Hungry Diner	
1993	Nowhere to Run	Fire Thug Al	
1993	Joshua Tree	Transport Guard #1	
1993	Excessive Force	Delivery Man	
1996	Sunchaser	Hay Hauler	
1996	Johns	Santa Claus	(final film role)
