= Monica Staggs =

American stuntwoman and actress (born 1970)

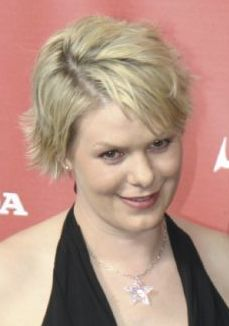
- Staggs in 2007
- Born: February 24, 1970 (age 56); Boulder, Colorado, U.S.
- Spouse: Gary Wayton (m. 2010; div. 2018)
- Website: http://www.monicastaggs.com/

Monica Staggs (born February 24, 1970) is an American stuntwoman and actress. Her acting credits include roles in The Settlement (1999), Sorority Boys (2002), Quentin Tarantino's Death Proof (2007), as Lanna Frank, Hesher (2010), 2009 web series Angel of Death, and Once Upon a Time in Hollywood (2019), as Connie.

== Early life ==
Staggs spent her youth in central Arkansas and graduated from Sylvan Hills High School in 1988. After taking a role as a stand-in actress in a low budget film in Arkansas, the role included some stunt work that caught the attention of stunt coordinator Gary Walton, whom she would later marry in 2010.

== Acting and stunt career ==
With more than 100 films and TV shows to her credit, Staggs was honored as the 2005 co-recipient of the World Stunt Award for Best Fight and Best Overall Stunt by a Stuntwoman, which she shared with Zoë Bell, for the opening fight in Kill Bill: Volume 2.
