= Death Proof =

- Theatrical release poster
- Directed by: Quentin Tarantino
- Written by: Quentin Tarantino
- Produced by: Elizabeth Avellán; Robert Rodriguez; Erica Steinberg; Quentin Tarantino
- Starring: Kurt Russell; Rosario Dawson; Vanessa Ferlito; Jordan Ladd; Rose McGowan; Sydney Tamiia Poitier; Tracie Thoms; Mary Elizabeth Winstead; Zoë Bell
- Cinematography: Quentin Tarantino
- Edited by: Sally Menke
- Production companies: Rodriguez International Pictures; Troublemaker Studios
- Distributed by: Dimension Films
- Release date: April 6, 2007 (Note: Released as part of the double feature Grindhouse)
- Running time: 96 minutes (US); 113 minutes (International)
- Country: United States
- Language: English
- Budget: $30 million
- Box office: $31.1 million

Death Proof is a 2007 American slasher film written, co-produced, shot and directed by Quentin Tarantino. It stars Kurt Russell as a stuntman who murders young women with modified cars he describes as "death-proof". Rosario Dawson, Vanessa Ferlito, Jordan Ladd, Rose McGowan, Sydney Tamiia Poitier, Tracie Thoms, Mary Elizabeth Winstead, and Zoë Bell co-star as the women he targets.

The film was originally released theatrically by Dimension Films on April 6, 2007, as part of Grindhouse, a double feature that combined Death Proof with Robert Rodriguez's Planet Terror. After Grindhouse underperformed at the domestic box office, Death Proof was released as a standalone feature in other countries and on home media. It received mostly positive reviews for its stunt sequences and tribute to exploitation cinema, although its pacing was criticized.

== Plot ==
Three friends, Arlene, Shanna and radio DJ "Jungle" Julia Lucai, drive down Congress Avenue in Austin, Texas, on their way to celebrate Julia's birthday. In a bar, Julia reveals that she made a radio announcement offering a free lap dance from Arlene in return for addressing her as "Butterfly", buying her a drink, and reciting a segment of the poem "Stopping by Woods on a Snowy Evening". Aging Hollywood stunt double "Stuntman" Mike trails the women to a bar and claims the lap dance. Arlene is suspicious, having seen Mike's car earlier that day, but he convinces her to give him the lap dance.

The women prepare to depart with Lanna, another friend. Pam, Julia's old classmate, accepts Mike's offer of a ride home. Mike takes Pam to his Hollywood stunt car rigged with a roll cage and tells her the car is "death proof", but only for the driver. He speeds and slams on the brakes, smashing Pam's skull on the dashboard, killing her. He catches up with the women's car and drives into it head-on at high speed, killing them. Mike survives with no serious injury. Texas Ranger McGraw believes Mike killed the women intentionally, but because Mike was sober while the women were intoxicated, he cannot be charged.

Fourteen months later, three young women, makeup artist Abernathy Ross, stunt driver Kim Mathis and actress Lee Montgomery, are driving through Lebanon, Tennessee on break from a film shoot. They stop at a convenience store, where Mike watches them from his car. The women pick up their friend, stuntwoman Zoë Bell, from the airport while Mike photographs them unaware. Zoë tells them she wants to test-drive a 1970 Dodge Challenger, the same type of car from the 1971 film Vanishing Point, and has found one for sale nearby. The owner, Jasper, lets them test-drive it unsupervised after Abernathy tells him Lee is a porn star, and she is left behind as collateral.

Zoë tells Abernathy and Kim that she wants to play a game they call "Ship's Mast", whereby she rides the hood holding belts fastened to the car while Kim drives at speed. Kim is hesitant but agrees. The three enjoy the stunt, unaware that Mike is watching them. He rear-ends them in his car, causing Zoë to lose her grip on both belts and be left holding on to the hood. After several more collisions, he T-bones them, throwing Zoë from the hood. Kim shoots Mike's left shoulder and he flees in his car. Abernathy and Kim cry over the apparent loss of their friend, until Zoë emerges uninjured. The three agree to catch up to Mike and kill him.

The women catch up to Mike as he is treating his wound and ram him, then Zoë gets out and beats him with a pipe. They continue chasing him as he pleads for mercy, finally flipping his car off the road. They drag him from the wreckage and beat him to death, then celebrating their victory.

== Cast ==
- Kurt Russell as Stuntman Mike McKay
- Zoë Bell as herself
- Rosario Dawson as Abernathy Ross
- Vanessa Ferlito as Arlene/Butterfly
- Sydney Tamiia Poitier as Jungle Julia Lucai
- Tracie Thoms as Kim Mathis
- Rose McGowan as Pam
- Jordan Ladd as Shanna
- Mary Elizabeth Winstead as Lee Montgomery
- Quentin Tarantino as Warren
- Marcy Harriell as Marcy
- Eli Roth as Dov
- Omar Doom as Nate
- Michael Bacall as Omar
- Monica Staggs as Lanna Frank
- Jonathan Loughran as Jasper
- Nicky Katt as Counter Guy
- Michael Parks as Texas Ranger Earl McGraw
- James Parks as Ranger Edgar McGraw
- Marley Shelton as Dr. Dakota Block

== Production ==
The story for Death Proof developed from Quentin Tarantino's fascination for the way stuntmen would "death-proof" stunt cars so a driver could survive horrific, high-speed crashes and collisions. This inspired Tarantino to create a slasher film featuring a deranged stuntman who stalks and murders young women with his "death-proof" car. Tarantino remembers, "I realized I couldn't do a straight slasher film, because with the exception of women-in-prison films, there is no other genre quite as rigid. And if you break that up, you aren't really doing it anymore. It's inorganic, so I realized—let me take the structure of a slasher film and just do what I do. My version is going to be fucked up and disjointed, but it seemingly uses the structure of a slasher film, hopefully against you."

According to Robert Rodriguez, "[Tarantino] had an idea and a complete vision for it right away when he first talked about it. He started to tell me the story and said, 'It's got this death-proof car in it.' I said, 'You have to call it Death Proof.' I helped title the movie, but that's it." Of the car chases, Tarantino stated: "CGI for car stunts doesn't make any sense to me—how is that supposed to be impressive? [...] I don't think there have been any good car chases since I started making films in '92—to me, the last terrific car chase was in Terminator 2. And Final Destination 2 had a magnificent car action piece. In between that, not a lot. Every time a stunt happens, there's twelve cameras and they use every angle for Avid editing, but I don't feel it in my stomach. It's just action." Death Proof marked Tarantino's first credit as a cinematographer.

Tarantino attempted to cast John Travolta, Denzel Washington, Willem Dafoe, John Malkovich, Mickey Rourke, Ron Perlman, Bruce Willis, Kal Penn, and Sylvester Stallone in Death Proof, but none were able to work due to prior commitments. In an interview, Tarantino revealed that he cast Kurt Russell as the killer stunt driver because "for people of my generation, he's a true hero ... but now, there's a whole audience out there that doesn't know what Kurt Russell can do. When I open the newspaper and see an ad that says, 'Kurt Russell in Dreamer,' or 'Kurt Russell in Miracle,' I'm not disparaging these movies, but I'm thinking: When is Kurt Russell going to be a badass again?" Eli Roth, Planet Terror leading actress Rose McGowan, and Tarantino himself appear in the film. Roth flew in from Europe, where he was filming Hostel: Part II, to film his scenes, which took one day.

After being stunned by stuntwoman Zoë Bell, who worked as Uma Thurman's stunt double in Tarantino's earlier film Kill Bill, Tarantino wrote her the leading female role. This was her first on-screen acting, which Bell initially thought was going to be a cameo role. The character Zoë was based on the stuntwoman herself and includes small stories based around her real-life experiences, some with Tarantino. When her name was featured on the film posters opposite Kurt Russell, Rosario Dawson and Rose McGowan, she realized how big the role was.

Death Proof uses various unconventional techniques to make the film appear more like those that were shown in grindhouse theaters in the 1970s. Throughout the feature, the film was intentionally damaged to make it look like many of the exploitation films of the 1970s which were generally shipped around from theater to theater and usually ended up in bad shape. A notable example of one of the film's deliberate jump-cuts is seen at the beginning, when the title Quentin Tarantino's Thunder Bolt is shown for a split second before abruptly being replaced by an insert with the title Death Proof, appearing in white lettering on a black background. (Exploitation films were commonly retitled, especially if they received bad press on initial release.)

On the editing of Death Proof, Tarantino stated, "There is half-an-hour's difference between my Death Proof and what is playing in Grindhouse. […] I was like a brutish American exploitation distributor who cut the movie down almost to the point of incoherence. I cut it down to the bone and took all the fat off it to see if it could still exist, and it worked." An extended, 127-minute version of Death Proof was screened in competition for the Palme d'Or at the 60th Cannes Film Festival. Tarantino is quoted as saying, "It works great as a double feature, but I'm just as excited if not more excited about actually having the world see Death Proof unfiltered. [...] It will be the first time everyone sees Death Proof by itself, including me."

== Soundtrack ==
The soundtrack for Death Proof consists entirely of non-original music, including excerpts from the scores of other films. It was released on April 3, 2007, alongside the Planet Terror soundtrack. Both albums featured dialogue excerpts from the film.

== Release ==
Death Proof was released in the US and Canada alongside Planet Terror as part of a double feature under the title Grindhouse. Both films were released separately in extended versions internationally, approximately two months apart. The additional material includes scenes that were replaced in the American theatrical release version with a "missing reel" title card, such as the lap dance scene. A total of 27 minutes were added for this version. One of the first screenings of Death Proof was made at the Edinburgh International Film Festival on August 20, 2007, with star Zoë Bell attending the screenings.

The Dutch poster artwork for Death Proof claimed that the film would feature "coming attractions" from Robert Rodriguez. In the United Kingdom, Death Proof was released on September 21, 2007, and in Australia on November 1, 2007. Explaining the split in foreign releases, Tarantino stated, "Especially if they were dealing with non-English language countries, they don't really have this tradition … not only do they not really know what a grindhouse is, they don't even have the double feature tradition. So you are kind of trying to teach us something else."

=== Critical reception ===
Death Proof received generally moderate reviews. On the review aggregator website Rotten Tomatoes, the film holds an approval rating of 67% based on 45 reviews, with an average rating of 5.3/10. The website's critics consensus reads, "Death Proof may feel somewhat minor in the context of Tarantino's larger filmography, but on its own merits, it packs just enough of a wallop to deliver sufficiently high-octane grindhouse goods." The French magazine Les Cahiers du cinéma ranked Death Proof second best film of the year 2007.

Damon Wise of Empire magazine gave the film four out of five stars and a mostly positive review, describing the film as "Tarantino driving wildly under the influence" and "seriously entertaining". The BBC's Anna Smith said that while there was "fun to be had" with the film, "its imitation of a defunct, low-budget style of movie-making is perhaps too accurate when it comes to the genre's flaws", and gave the film three out of five stars. Roger Ebert of the Chicago Sun-Times gave Grindhouse 2.5 out of 4 stars, writing that while Death Proof was the more enjoyable half of the bill, it was still marred by overlong scenes of expository dialogue.

The Guardian's Peter Bradshaw expressed admiration for the car crash scene, describing it as "a lethal roar of entertainment", but said that the film was padded with "long, long, long stretches of bizarrely inconsequential conversation [...] which are a big comedown from the glorious riffs from Reservoir Dogs and Pulp Fiction", and that overall "Tarantino's twisted genius is there for all to see – but, it must now be admitted, all too briefly". Tarantino said at a 2012 director's roundtable, "Death Proof has got to be the worst movie I ever made. And for a left-handed movie, that wasn't so bad, all right? — so if that's the worst I ever get, I'm good."

=== Home media ===
Death Proof was released on DVD in the US on September 18, 2007, in a two-disc special edition featuring the extended version of the film, documentaries on the casting of the film, the various muscle cars and Tarantino's relationship with editor Sally Menke, trailers, and an international poster gallery. On December 16, 2008, a BD release of identical content followed.

A Japanese DVD release has the films Grindhouse, Death Proof and Planet Terror, with extras and fake trailers, in a six-DVD box set (English with optional Japanese subtitles). Death Proof was also released as a German HD DVD, believed to be the last film published in the now-defunct format.

The Grindhouse double feature was eventually released on Blu-ray Disc in October 2010.

== See also ==
- List of works by Quentin Tarantino
