= Vanessa Ferlito =

American actress

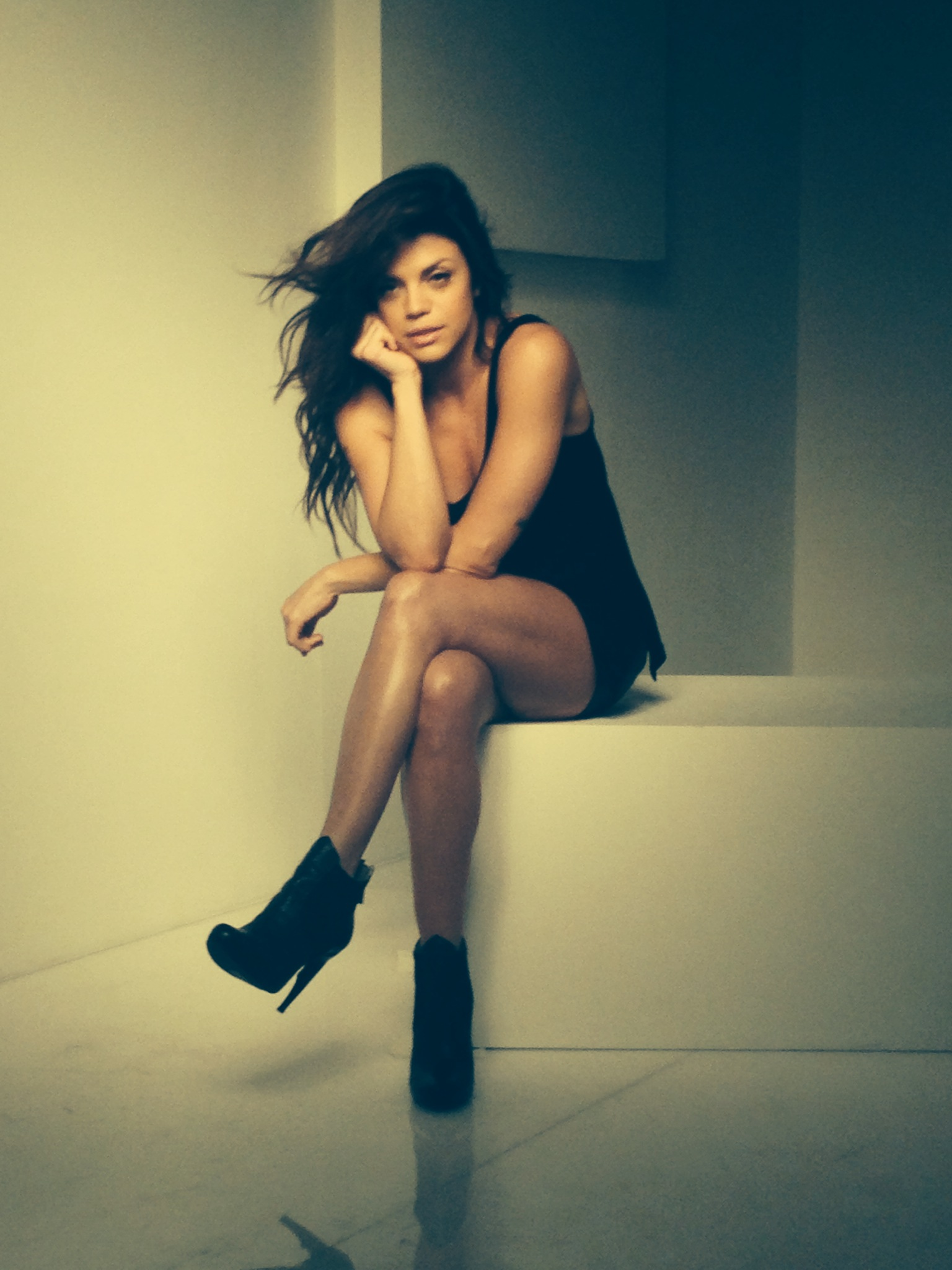
- Ferlito at a photoshoot in 2014
- Born: December 28, 1977 (age 48); Brooklyn, New York, U.S.
- Occupation: Actress
- Years active: 2001–present
- Known for: CSI: NY (2004–2006); Graceland (2013–2015); NCIS: New Orleans (2016–2021)
- Children: 1

Vanessa Ferlito (born December 28, 1977) is an American actress. She is known for playing Detective Aiden Burn in the first two seasons of the CBS crime drama CSI: NY, as well as for her recurring portrayal of Claudia Hernandez in FOX drama 24, and for her starring roles as FBI Agent Charlie DeMarco in the USA Network series Graceland and as Tammy Gregorio on the CBS crime drama series NCIS: New Orleans.

She has also appeared in a number of films, including Spider-Man 2 (2004), Shadowboxer (2005), Man of the House (2005), Gridiron Gang (2006), Death Proof (2007), Nothing like the Holidays (2008), Madea Goes to Jail (2009), Julie & Julia (2009), Wall Street: Money Never Sleeps (2010), and Stand Up Guys (2012).

== Early life ==
Vanessa Ferlito was born on December 28, 1977, in Brooklyn, New York City, to an Italian-American family. She was raised by her mother and her stepfather, who owned a hair salon in Brooklyn. Her father died of a heroin overdose when she was two years old. She said of her youth in Brooklyn: "I hung out with a rough crowd. And the neighborhood I grew up in was rough. We were scrappers. I fought my way through school."

She became a notable fixture in the late-night circuit in New York City, telling New York magazine in 1998: "It’s like a job, going out – every night we’re trying to get people to introduce us to people. It’s all about who you know and what you do with it."

== Career ==
Early in her career, Ferlito worked as a model for Wilhelmina Models. Ferlito developed acting aspirations early in her life and broke into the entertainment business through a series of guest spots and recurring roles.

In 2003, Ferlito starred as Lizette Sanchez in John Leguizamo's boxing drama Undefeated, which earned her an NAACP nomination for Outstanding Actress in a TV movie. This was followed in 2004 by a role in Spider-Man 2. In 2005 Ferlito appeared in Stephen Herek's Man of the House, opposite Tommy Lee Jones, for which she received positive notice, with Variety's Joe Leydon stating that "Vanessa Ferlito is the standout, mainly because she's the only one who gets enough to do to make a strong impression as a distinctive personality."

Ferlito was a series regular on the first two seasons (2004–2005) of CBS's CSI: NY, as Aiden Burn, a member of the forensic investigation team led by Mac Taylor (Gary Sinise). Ferlito has also appeared in other television series, including HBO's The Sopranos, NBC's Law & Order and Third Watch, and had a recurring role as Claudia in FOX's series 24.

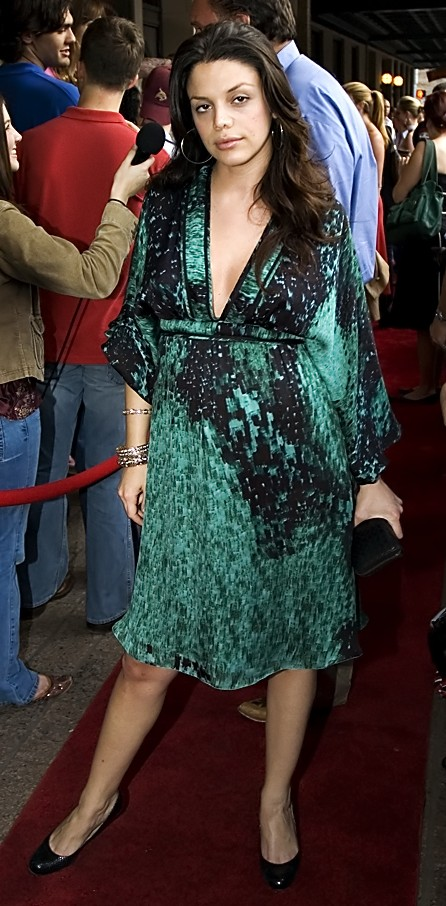
Ferlito at the premiere of Grindhouse (2007) in Austin, Texas.

After CSI: NY, Ferlito starred in several films, among them Wall Street: Money Never Sleeps; Nora Ephron's Julie & Julia opposite Meryl Streep, Stanley Tucci and Amy Adams; Tyler Perry's Madea Goes to Jail; and Alfredo De Villa's Nothing like the Holidays (originally titled Humboldt Park) with Alfred Molina, John Leguizamo and Jay Hernandez. Prior to these, Ferlito appeared in Quentin Tarantino's Death Proof opposite Kurt Russell, a role Tarantino wrote specifically for Ferlito. She also appeared in Lee Daniel's Shadowboxer with Helen Mirren and Cuba Gooding Jr.

In 2012, Ferlito was cast in the feature film, Stand Up Guys, opposite Al Pacino, Christopher Walken and Alan Arkin. She also played Charlie DeMarco on USA Network's Graceland, which ran between 2013 and 2015. In 2016, Ferlito was added to the cast of NCIS: New Orleans for the show's third season, playing an FBI special agent who is sent from DC to investigate the NCIS team.

== Personal life ==
Ferlito gave birth to a son in September 2007 and raised her child as a single mother. In her free time, she enjoys yoga, hiking, and cycling.

== Filmography ==
=== Film ===
| Year | Title | Role | Notes |
|---|---|---|---|
| 2002 | On Line | Jordan Nash | |
| 2002 | 25th Hour | Lindsay Jamison | |
| 2004 | Spider-Man 2 | Louise | |
| 2004 | The Tollbooth | Gina | |
| 2005 | Man of the House | Heather | |
| 2005 | Shadowboxer | Vicki | |
| 2006 | Gridiron Gang | Lisa Gonzales | |
| 2007 | Death Proof | Arlene "Butterfly" | |
| 2007 | Descent | Bodega Girl | |
| 2008 | Nothing like the Holidays | Roxanna Rodriguez | |
| 2009 | Madea Goes to Jail | Donna | |
| 2009 | Julie & Julia | Cassie | |
| 2010 | Wall Street: Money Never Sleeps | Audrey | |
| 2012 | Stand Up Guys | Sylvia | |
| 2013 | Duke | "Cookie" | |
| 2015 | All Mistakes Buried | Franki | Originally titled The Aftermath |

=== Television ===
| Year | Title | Role | Notes |
|---|---|---|---|
| 2001, 2004 | The Sopranos | Tina Francesco | Episodes: "Another Toothpick", "Rat Pack" |
| 2002 | Third Watch | Val | Episode: "Blackout" |
| 2003 | Law & Order | Tina Montoya | Episode: "Star Crossed" |
| 2003 | Undefeated | Lizette Sanchez | TV movie |
| 2003–2004 | 24 | Claudia Hernandez | Recurring role, 11 episodes |
| 2004 | CSI: Miami | Aiden Burn | Episode: "MIA/NYC Nonstop" |
| 2004–2006 | CSI: NY | Aiden Burn | Main role (seasons 1–2), 26 episodes |
| 2006 | Drift | Georgia Fields | Unsold TV pilot |
| 2011 | Cooper and Stone | Angela Stone | Unsold TV pilot |
| 2013–2015 | Graceland | Catherine "Charlie" DeMarco | Main role, 38 episodes |
| 2016–2021 | NCIS: New Orleans | Tammy Gregorio | Main role (season 3–7) |
| 2023 | Bookie | Lorraine Colavito | Main Cast, 13 episodes |
| 2024 | Griselda | Carmen Gutiérrez | Netflix miniseries |
