= Vail Bloom =

American actress

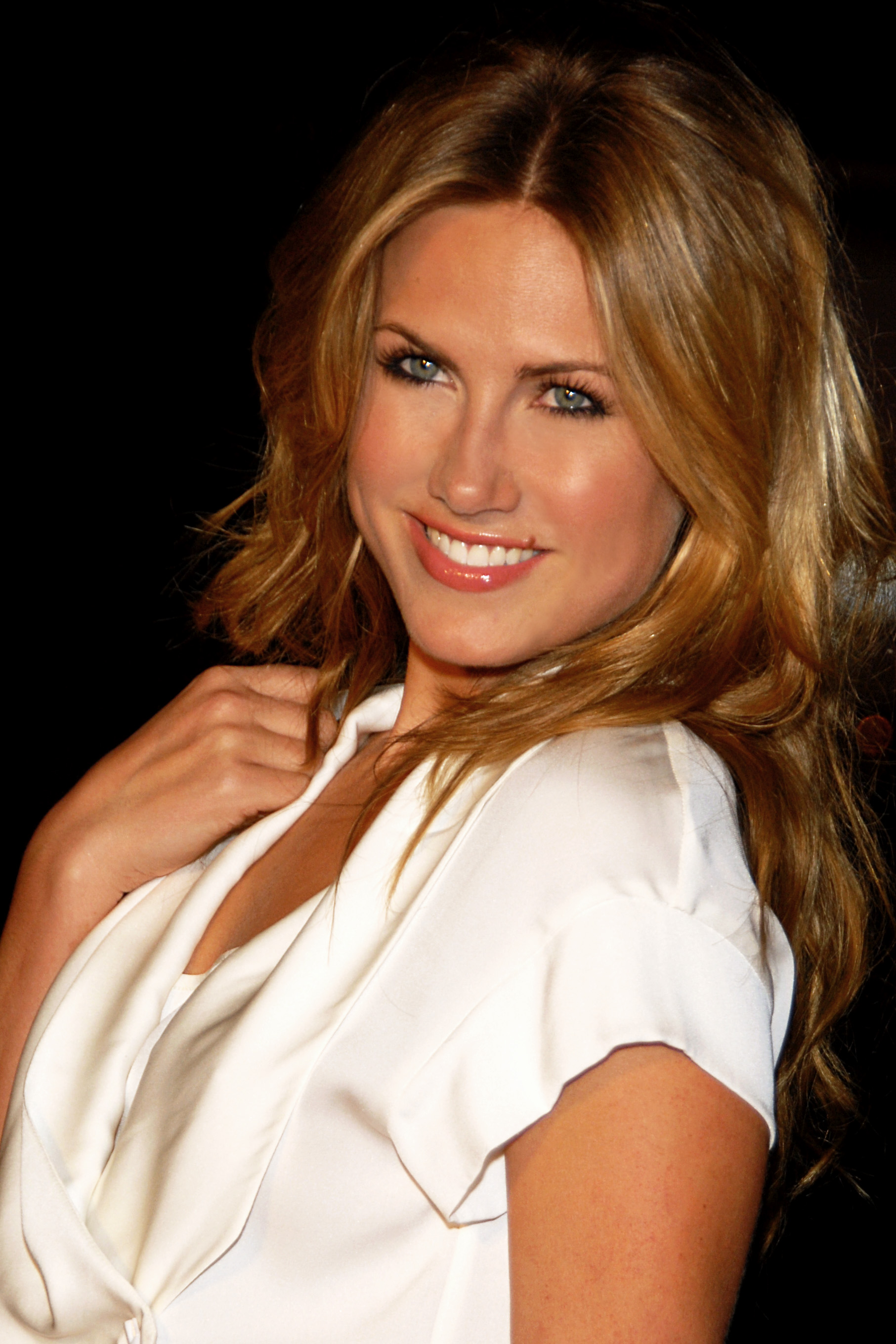
- Vail attending Maxim Magazine's 10th Annual Hot 100 Celebration, Santa Monica, CA on May 13, 2009
- Born: Boston, Massachusetts, U.S.
- Education: Princeton University (BA)
- Occupation: Actress
- Years active: 2006–present
- Children: 2

Vail Bloom is an American actress and producer. She played Heather Stevens on the CBS soap opera The Young and the Restless, a role for which she received a Daytime Emmy Award nomination for Outstanding Younger Actress in a Drama Series in 2008. Bloom has also appeared in films and television series including Finishing the Game, Las Vegas, Cold Case, Castle, Too Late, Surviving the Wild, Orphan Horse, and Vanderpump Rules. She graduated from Princeton University with a degree in architecture.

== Early life and education ==
Bloom was born in Boston, Massachusetts and grew up in Connecticut and Florida. She attended Princeton University, where she studied architecture and was a member of the diSiac Dance Company. She graduated in 2004 with a degree in architecture.

During her Sophomore year at Princeton, Bloom became interested in acting after a roommate asked her to appear in a student film. After graduating, she moved to California, hired a manager, and began attending acting classes.

== Career ==
Bloom's early acting credits included a guest role on Las Vegas and a role in the 2007 independent film Finishing the Game. In 2007, she joined the CBS soap opera The Young and the Restless as attorney Heather Stevens. She played the role from 2007 to 2010 and received a Daytime Emmy Award nomination for Outstanding Younger Actress in a Drama Series in 2008.

After leaving The Young and the Restless, Bloom appeared in projects including A Valentine's Date, Angel of Death, Cold Case, Hollywood Heights, and Hello Ladies.

In 2014, Bloom appeared as herself in the third season of the Bravo reality series Vanderpump Rules.

Bloom appeared in the films Too Late in 2015, Surviving the Wild, The Ghost Beyond, and Orphan Horse. She was also credited as an executive producer on Surviving the Wild and as a producer on Style Queens.

In 2023, Bloom returned to the Young and the Restless as Heather Stevens. She exited the role again in 2024 after the character was killed off.

In 2023, Bloom appeared in the television film How to Frame a Family. In 2026, she appeared in My Granddaughter Has Your Son's Face.

== Personal life ==
In 2014, Bloom admitted that she had a drug problem during her years on The Young and the Restless. "I was on The Young and the Restless for just under three years and I was starting to get into this whole like… what seemed like the Hollywood lifestyle, and I was starting to get into a little bit of trouble with drugs," Bloom said in an episode of Vanderpump Rules.

In February 2018, Bloom filed for a restraining order against her ex-boyfriend Hayes Stuppy. Bloom claimed that she only dated Stuppy for three weeks in 2017 and that the reason for the restraining order was because he had sent her several unwanted emails and has a history of stalking.

Bloom has a child, Charlie (born in August 2018).

== Filmography ==
Year	Title	Role	Notes
2006	Las Vegas	Woman #2	Episode: "Delinda's Box, Part 1"
2007–2010; 2023–2024	The Young and the Restless	Heather Stevens	Role from: July 13, 2007 – April 6, 2010, Recurring: February 15, 2023 – September 26, 2024
2007	Finishing the Game	Cassie	Film
2008	Time	Annie	Short film
2009	Angel of Death	Regina Downes	Web series
2009	Entourage	Amy's assistant	Episode: "One Car, Two Car, Red Car, Blue Car"
2009	Fantasy Over Reality	Whole Foods Sarah	Television film
2009	Cold Case	Alyssa Lane	Episode: "Forensics"
2010	The Somnambulist	Irene Bailey	Film
2011	Your Love Never Fails	Beth	Video
2011	Life at the Resort	Allison	Film
2012	Hollywood Heights	Bree	Episode: "The Text Spoof"
2012	Aspen the Series	Madison Hartman	6 episodes
2013	Castle	Tiffany Shaw	Episode: "Death Gone Crazy"
2013	Hello Ladies	Ashley	Episode: "The Limo"
2014	Overwatch	Megan	Short film
2014–2015	Vanderpump Rules	Herself	Reality series
2015	Too Late	Janet Lyons	Film
2016	Style Queens	Herself	Also producer
2018	Surviving the Wild	Rachel	Film; also executive producer
2018	The Ghost Beyond	Jennifer Burrows	Film
2018	Orphan Horse	Caroline Crowley	Film

== Accolades ==
Year	Award	Category	Work	Result	Ref
2008	Daytime Emmy Award	Outstanding Younger Actress in a Drama Series	The Young and the Restless	Nominated	
