= List of awards and nominations received by Mariah Carey =

Mariah Carey awards and nominations
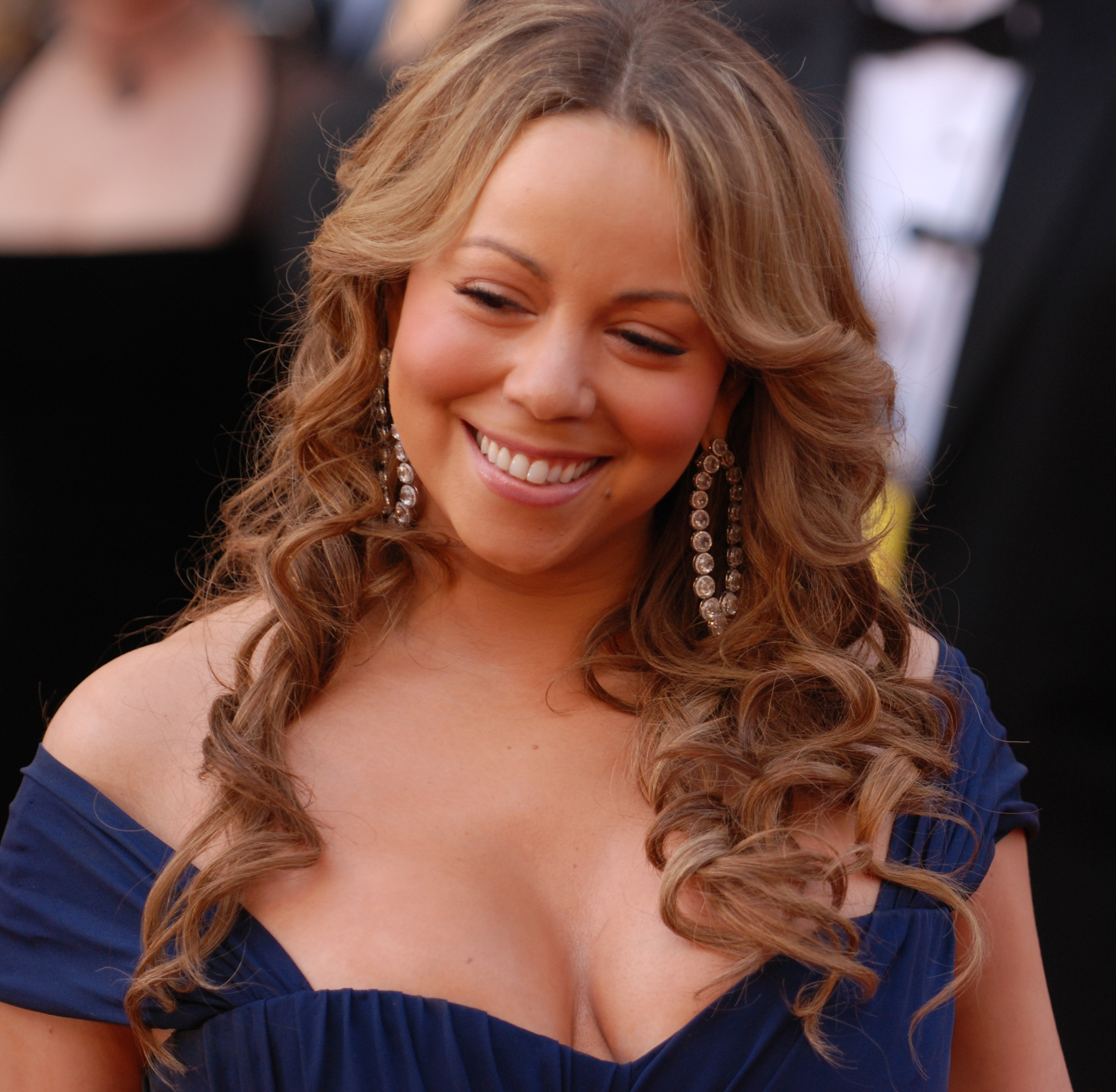
- Carey at the 82nd Academy Awards
Awards and nominations
Award	Wins	Nominations
American Music Awards	10	39
Billboard	14	22
Grammy	5	34
MTV VMA	2	8
World Music	19	24
Golden Globe Awards	0	1
Tony Awards	0	1

Totals (Note: Certain award groups do not simply award one winner. They acknowledge several different recipients, have runners-up, and have third place. Since this is a specific recognition and is different from losing an award, runner-up mentions are considered wins in this award tally. For simplification and to avoid errors, each award in this list has been presumed to have had a prior nomination.)
- Wins: 217
- Nominations: 377

American singer-songwriter Mariah Carey has received many awards and honors throughout her career. Three of her major achievements include: Billboard's Artist of the Decade (1990s), World Music Awards' Best Selling Female Artist of the Millennium and a Grammy Award for Best New Artist in 1991. Throughout her career, Carey has won a total of 6 Grammy Awards (including a Grammy Global Impact Award), 19 World Music Awards, 14 Billboard Music Awards and 10 American Music Awards. She is also an inductee of the Songwriters Hall of Fame. In 2014, she was the eighth most awarded recording artist.

Carey's fifth studio album, Daydream received critical acclaim and the music industry took note of her success. Most notably Carey won many awards at the Billboard Music Awards, including the Hot 100 Singles Artist of the Year, Hot 100 Airplay ("Always Be My Baby"), Hot Adult Contemporary Artist of the Year and Special Award for 16 weeks at number-one for "One Sweet Day". Daydream went on to be one of the best-selling and most acclaimed albums of 1995. Despite this, Carey did not win any Grammy Awards at the 38th Annual Grammy Awards. In 2006, Carey's song "We Belong Together" was nominated for the Grammy Awards for Song of the Year but lost to U2. Vulture called it one of "the greatest Grammys snubs of all time" saying that the song "cemented a career resurgence for [Carey] and has aged flawlessly, becoming one of her best-known songs". The song won for Best R&B Song and Best Female R&B Vocal Performance. Her tenth studio album The Emancipation of Mimi received many award nominations including that for ten Grammy Awards. In 2024, the Recording Academy's Black Music Collective honored her with the Global Impact Award.

Throughout her career, Carey has been honoured several times for her musical and philanthropic work. In 1995, Carey was honoured as the Best-Selling World Recording Artist by the World Music Awards. In 1999, Carey was awarded a Congressional Award for her work with The Fresh Air Fund and the New York City Administration for Children's Services. In 2026, she was honored as Person of the Year by the Recording Academy's MusiCares. Towards the end of the '90s decade, Carey was named the Artist of the Decade by Billboard with Entertainment Tonight calling it one of her "biggest milestones". In August 2015, Carey was honored with a star on the Hollywood Walk of Fame. In 2017, Carey was honoured at the VH1 Hip Hop Honors for her contributions to R&B and hip-hop genre. In 2019, Carey was honoured by Variety's Power of Women for her work with The Fresh Air Fund's Camp Mariah alongside Jennifer Aniston, Awkwafina, and numerous others. Dubbed the "Queen of Christmas" by the media, Carey and her popular song "All I Want For Christmas Is You" set four Guinness World Records in 2019. In 2021, Carey broke three more Guinness Word Records. One of these records was becoming the first solo artist in history to top the Billboard Hot 100 in four consecutive decades.

Despite music being her primary source of accomplishment, Carey has also received nominations and awards for other works in retail and film. In 2007, Carey released her own fragrance, "M", in which went on to win a Basenotes Fragrance Award for Best Celebrity Women's Fragrance as well as being nominated in three other categories. Carey's first step in acting, for her film Glitter, was received with negative reviews. Carey won a Golden Raspberry Award for Worst Actress. The film is listed in Golden Raspberry Award founder John Wilson's book The Official Razzie Movie Guide as one of the 100 Most Enjoyably Bad Movies Ever Made. Conversely, in 2009, Carey starred in Precious, which went on to win numerous awards. Carey herself won the Breakthrough Performance Award at the Palm Springs International Film Festival for her work in Precious. In 2023, she was nominated for the Tony Award for Best Musical for producing the Broadway show Some Like It Hot.

== Awards and nominations ==
Name of the award, year the award was awarded, recipient or nominee, category and result
Award	Year (Note: Indicates the year of ceremony. Each year is linked to the article about the awards held that year, wherever possible.)	Recipient(s) and nominee(s)	Category	Result	Ref.
Alliance of Women Film Journalists	2009	Cast of Precious	Best Ensemble Cast	Nominated	
American Music Awards	1991	Herself	Favorite Pop/Rock Female Artist	Nominated	
American Music Awards	1991	Herself	Favorite Soul/R&B Female Artist	Nominated	
American Music Awards	1991	Herself	Favorite Pop/Rock New Artist	Nominated	
American Music Awards	1992	Herself	Favorite Pop/Rock Female Artist	Nominated	
American Music Awards	1992	Herself	Favorite Soul/R&B Female Artist	Won	
American Music Awards	1992	"Someday"	Favorite Dance Single	Nominated	
American Music Awards	1993	Herself	Favorite Pop/Rock Female Artist	Won	
American Music Awards	1993	Herself	Favorite Soul/R&B Female Artist	Nominated	
American Music Awards	1993	Herself	Favorite Adult Contemporary Artist	Nominated	
American Music Awards	1993	"I'll Be There"	Favorite Pop/Rock Single	Nominated	
American Music Awards	1993	MTV Unplugged EP	Favorite Adult Contemporary Album	Won	
American Music Awards	1993	MTV Unplugged EP	Favorite Soul/R&B Album	Nominated	
American Music Awards	1994	Herself	Favorite Pop/Rock Female Artist	Nominated	
American Music Awards	1994	Herself	Favorite Soul/R&B Female Artist	Nominated	
American Music Awards	1994	"Dreamlover"	Favorite Soul/R&B Single	Nominated	
American Music Awards	1995	Herself	Favorite Pop/Rock Female Artist	Won	
American Music Awards	1995	Herself	Favorite Adult Contemporary Artist	Nominated	
American Music Awards	1995	Music Box	Favorite Pop/Rock Album	Nominated	
American Music Awards	1995	Music Box	Favorite Soul/R&B Album	Nominated	
American Music Awards	1996	Herself	Favorite Pop/Rock Female Artist	Won	
American Music Awards	1996	Herself	Favorite Soul/R&B Female Artist	Won	
American Music Awards	1997	Herself	Favorite Pop/Rock Female Artist	Nominated	
American Music Awards	1997	Herself	Favorite Soul/R&B Female Artist	Nominated	
American Music Awards	1997	Herself	Favorite Adult Contemporary Artist	Nominated	
American Music Awards	1997	Daydream	Favorite Pop/Rock Album	Nominated	
American Music Awards	1997	Daydream	Favorite Soul/R&B Album	Nominated	
American Music Awards	1998	Herself	Favorite Soul/R&B Female Artist	Won	
American Music Awards	2005	Herself	Artist of the Year	Nominated	
American Music Awards	2005	Herself	Favorite Pop/Rock Female Artist	Nominated	
American Music Awards	2005	Herself	Favorite Soul/R&B Female Artist	Won	
American Music Awards	2005	The Emancipation Of Mimi	Favorite Pop/Rock Album	Nominated	
American Music Awards	2005	The Emancipation Of Mimi	Favorite Soul/R&B Album	Nominated	
American Music Awards	2006	Herself	Favorite Pop/Rock Female Artist	Nominated	
American Music Awards	2006	Herself	Favorite Soul/R&B Female Artist	Nominated	
American Music Awards	2006	The Emancipation Of Mimi	Favorite Soul/R&B Album	Nominated	
American Music Awards	2008	Herself	Favorite Pop/Rock Female Artist	Nominated	
American Music Awards	2008	E=MC²	Favorite Soul/R&B Album	Nominated	
Amigo Awards	1997	Herself	Best International Female Solo Artist	Nominated	
ALMA Awards	1999	Around the World	Outstanding Performance by Individual in a Music Series or Special	Nominated	
ALMA Awards	1999	The Prince of Egypt	Outstanding Performance of a Song for a Feature Film	Nominated	
ALMA Awards	1999	"When You Believe" (with Whitney Houston)	Outstanding Music Video	Nominated	
ALMA Awards	1999	"Honey"	Outstanding Music Video	Nominated	
ALMA Awards	2000	"Heartbreaker"	Outstanding Music Video Performers	Nominated	
ALMA Awards	2002	America: A Tribute to Heroes	Outstanding Performance by Individual in a Music Series or Special	Nominated	
ALMA Awards	2006	Herself	Favorite Female Music Artist	Nominated	
Bambi Awards	2005	Herself	Pop Artist of the Year	Won	
Basenote Awards	2008	"M" by Mariah Carey	Best Celebrity Women's Fragrance	Won	
Basenote Awards	2008	"M" by Mariah Carey	Best New Women's Fragrance	Nominated	
Basenote Awards	2008	"M" by Mariah Carey	Best Designer, Mainstream or Fine Fragrance	Nominated	
Basenote Awards	2008	"M" by Mariah Carey	Best Women's Fragrance for Day Wear	Nominated	
BET Awards	2005	Herself	Best Female R&B Artist	Nominated	
BET Awards	2006	Herself	Best Female R&B Artist	Nominated	
BET Awards	2006	"Don't Forget About Us"	Viewer's Choice	Nominated	
BET Awards	2008	Herself	Best Female R&B Artist	Nominated	
Billboard Music Awards	1991	Herself	Top Pop Artist	Won	
Billboard Music Awards	1991	Herself	Top Adult Contemporary Artist	Won	
Billboard Music Awards	1991	Herself	Top Hot 100 Singles Artist	Won	
Billboard Music Awards	1991	Mariah Carey	Album of the Year	Won	
Billboard Music Awards	1994	Herself	Top Female Artist	Won	
Billboard Music Awards	1994	"Hero"	Top Single	Nominated	
Billboard Music Awards	1996	Herself	Top Hot 100 Singles Artist	Won	
Billboard Music Awards	1996	"One Sweet Day"	Special Award (Note: For being number one for 16 weeks; the most for any artist at the time.)	Honoree	
Billboard Music Awards	1996	"One Sweet Day"	Single of the Year	Nominated	
Billboard Music Awards	1998	Herself	Special Award (Note: For achieving thirteen number one hits; the most or a female artist at the time.)	Honoree	
Billboard Music Awards	1999	Herself	Female Artist of the Year	Nominated	
Billboard Music Awards	2005	Herself	Female R&B/Hip-Hop Artist of the Year	Won	
Billboard Music Awards	2005	Herself	Female Billboard 200 Album Artist of the Yea	Won	
Billboard Music Awards	2005	Herself	Hot 100 Artist of the Year	Nominated	
Billboard Music Awards	2005	Herself	R&B/Hip-Hop Artist of the Year	Nominated	
Billboard Music Awards	2005	"We Belong Together"	Rhythmic Top 40 Title of the Year	Won	
Billboard Music Awards	2005	"We Belong Together"	Hot 100 Airplay of the Year	Won	
Billboard Music Awards	2005	"We Belong Together"	Top Hot R&B/Hip-Hop Song	Nominated	
Billboard Music Awards	2006	Herself	Female Billboard 200 Album Artist of the Year	Nominated	
Billboard Music Awards	2006	Herself	Female R&B/Hip-Hop Artist of the Year	Nominated	
Billboard Music Awards	2020	Herself	Chart Achievement Award	Nominated	
Billboard Music Awards	2023	"All I Want For Christmas Is You"	Chart Achievement Award	Won	
Billboard R&B/Hip-Hop Awards	2002	"Loverboy"	Top R&B/Hip-Hop Single - Sales	Won	
Billboard R&B/Hip-Hop Awards	2006	Herself	Top R&B/Hip Hop Artists	Won	
Billboard R&B/Hip-Hop Awards	2006	Herself	Top R&B/Hip Hop Female Artist	Won	
Billboard R&B/Hip-Hop Awards	2006	Herself	Hot R&B/Hip-Hop Songs Artist	Won	
Billboard R&B/Hip-Hop Awards	2006	Herself	Hot R&B/Hip-Hop Albums Artist	Won	
Billboard R&B/Hip-Hop Awards	2006	The Emancipation of Mimi	Top R&B/Hip-Hop Album	Won	
Billboard R&B/Hip-Hop Awards	2006	We Belong Together	Hot R&B/Hip-Hop Songs	Nominated	
Billboard R&B/Hip-Hop Awards	2006	Hot R&B/Hip-Hop Airplay Songs	Hot R&B/Hip-Hop Songs	Nominated	
Black Reel Awards	2010	Cast of Precious	Best Ensemble Cast	Won	
Black Reel Awards	2010	Best Supporting Actress	Herself	Nominated	
Blockbuster Entertainment Awards	1995	Herself	Favorite Pop Female Artist	Won	
Blockbuster Entertainment Awards	1996	"Fantasy"	Favorite Single	Won	
Blockbuster Entertainment Awards	1996	"One Sweet Day" (with Boyz II Men)	Favorite Adult Contemporary Single	Won	
Blockbuster Entertainment Awards	1998	Butterfly	Favorite Album by a Female Artist	Won	
Blockbuster Entertainment Awards	1999	Herself	Favorite Pop Female Artist	Won	
Blockbuster Entertainment Awards	2000	Herself	Favourite Female R&B Artist	Won	
Blockbuster Entertainment Awards	2000	"When You Believe" (with Whitney Houston)	Favorite Song from a Movie	Nominated	
BMI Pop Music Awards	1991	"Love Takes Time"	Song of the Year	Won	
BMI Pop Music Awards	1991	"Love Takes Time"	Best Songwriter	Won	
BMI Pop Music Awards	1991	"I Don't Wanna Cry"	Best Songwriter	Won	
BMI Pop Music Awards	1991	"Someday"	Best Songwriter	Won	
BMI Pop Music Awards	1991	"Vision of Love"	Best Songwriter	Won	
BMI Pop Music Awards	1992	Herself	Songwriter of The Year	Won	
BMI Pop Music Awards	1993	"Can't Let Go"	Best Song	Won	
BMI Pop Music Awards	1993	"Emotions"	Best Song	Won	
BMI Pop Music Awards	1993	"Make It Happen"	Best Song	Won	
BMI Pop Music Awards	1994	"Dreamlover"	Songwriter of the Year	Won	
BMI Pop Music Awards	1995	"Dreamlover"	Songwriter of the Year	Won	
BMI Pop Music Awards	1995	"Hero"	Songwriter of the Year	Won	
BMI Pop Music Awards	1995	"Anytime You Need a Friend"	Songwriter of the Year	Won	
BMI Pop Music Awards	1996	"Anytime You Need a Friend"	Songwriter of the Year	Won	
BMI Pop Music Awards	1997	"One Sweet Day"	Song of the Year	Won	
BMI Pop Music Awards	1997	"One Sweet Day"	Best Pop Songwriter	Won	
BMI Pop Music Awards	1997	"Fantasy"	Best Pop Songwriter	Won	
BMI Pop Music Awards	1997	"Forever"	Best Pop Songwriter	Won	
BMI Pop Music Awards	1997	"Always Be My Baby"	Best Pop Songwriter	Won	
BMI Pop Music Awards	1998	"Always Be My Baby"	Best Pop Songwriter	Won	
BMI Pop Music Awards	1999	Herself	Songwriter of the Year	Won	
BMI Pop Music Awards	1999	"Butterfly"	Songwriter of the Year	Won	
BMI Pop Music Awards	1999	"Honey"	Songwriter of the Year	Won	
BMI Pop Music Awards	1999	"My All"	Songwriter of the Year	Won	
BMI Pop Music Awards	2006	"We Belong Together"	Top Billboard Song	Won	
BMI Pop Music Awards	2006	"We Belong Together"	Most Performed Song	Won	
BMI Pop Music Awards	2006	"Don't Forget About Us"	Most Performed Song	Won	
BMI Pop Music Awards	2006	"Shake It Off"	Most Performed Song	Won	
BMI Pop Music Awards	2007	"Shake It Off"	Songwriter of the Year	Won	
BMI Pop Music Awards	2007	"Don't Forget About Us"	Songwriter of the Year	Won	
BMI Pop Music Awards	2008	"Touch My Body"	Songwriter of the Year	Won	
Boston Society of Film Critics	2009	Cast of Precious	Best Ensemble Cast	Won	
Brit Awards	1991	Herself	International Breakthrough Act	Nominated	
Brit Awards	1991	Herself	International Female Solo Artist	Nominated	
Brit Awards	1994	Herself	International Female Solo Artist	Nominated	
Brit Awards	1996	Herself	International Female Solo Artist	Nominated	
Brit Awards	2006	Herself	International Female Solo Artist	Nominated	
Brit Awards	2023	Herself	Brits Billion Award	Won	
Critics' Choice Movie Awards	2014	Cast of The Butler	Best Acting Ensemble	Nominated	
Drama League Awards	2023	Some Like It Hot	Outstanding Production of a Musical	Won	
Echo Awards	1995	Herself	International Rock/Pop Female Artist	Won	
Fifi Awards	2011	"Lollipop Bling" by Mariah Carey	Best Packaging of the Year	Nominated	
GMA Dove Awards	2026	"Jesus I Do" (with Mariah Carey)	Contemporary Gospel Recorded Song of the Year	Nominated	
Golden Globe Awards (Note: Note: "When You Believe" (from: The Prince of Egypt) was also nominated for the Best Original Song in 1999, however in this category the nomination is credited to the songwriters and not the performer. The song was written by Stephen Schwartz.)	2018	"The Star" (from: The Star)	Best Original Song	Nominated	
Golden Raspberry Awards	2002	Herself in Glitter	Worst Actress	Won	
Golden Raspberry Awards	2002	Herself and her cleavage in Glitter	Worst Screen Couple	Nominated	
Grammy Awards	1991	Mariah Carey	Album of the Year	Nominated	
Grammy Awards	1991	"Vision of Love"	Record of the Year	Nominated	
Grammy Awards	1991	"Vision of Love"	Song of the Year	Nominated	
Grammy Awards	1991	"Vision of Love"	Best Pop Vocal Performance, Female	Won	
Grammy Awards	1991	Herself	Best New Artist	Won	
Grammy Awards	1992	Herself (with Walter Afanasieff)	Producer of the Year, Non-Classical	Nominated	
Grammy Awards	1992	"Emotions"	Best Pop Vocal Performance, Female	Nominated	
Grammy Awards	1993	"I'll Be There" (with Trey Lorenz)	Best R&B Performance by a Duo or Group with Vocals	Nominated	
Grammy Awards	1993	MTV Unplugged EP	Best Pop Vocal Performance, Female	Nominated	
Grammy Awards	1994	"Dreamlover"	Best Pop Vocal Performance, Female	Nominated	
Grammy Awards	1995	"Hero"	Best Female Pop Vocal Performance	Nominated	
Grammy Awards	1995	"Endless Love" (with Luther Vandross)	Best Pop Collaboration with Vocals	Nominated	
Grammy Awards	1996	Daydream	Album of the Year	Nominated	
Grammy Awards	1996	Daydream	Best Pop Vocal Album	Nominated	
Grammy Awards	1996	"Fantasy"	Best Female Pop Vocal Performance	Nominated	
Grammy Awards	1996	"One Sweet Day" (with Boyz II Men)	Record of the Year	Nominated	
Grammy Awards	1996	"One Sweet Day" (with Boyz II Men)	Best Pop Collaboration with Vocals	Nominated	
Grammy Awards	1996	"Always Be My Baby"	Best Female R&B Vocal Performance	Nominated	
Grammy Awards	1998	"Honey"	Best Female R&B Vocal Performance	Nominated	
Grammy Awards	1998	"Honey"	Best R&B Song	Nominated	
Grammy Awards	1998	"Butterfly"	Best Female Pop Vocal Performance	Nominated	
Grammy Awards	2000	"When You Believe" (with Whitney Houston)	Best Pop Collaboration with Vocals	Nominated	
Grammy Awards	2001	"Thank God I Found You" (feat. Joe & 98 Degrees)	Best Pop Collaboration with Vocals	Nominated	
Grammy Awards	2006	The Emancipation of Mimi	Album of the Year	Nominated	
Grammy Awards	2006	The Emancipation of Mimi	Best Contemporary R&B Album	Won	
Grammy Awards	2006	"We Belong Together"	Record of the Year	Nominated	
Grammy Awards	2006	"We Belong Together"	Song of the Year	Nominated	
Grammy Awards	2006	"We Belong Together"	Best R&B Song	Won	
Grammy Awards	2006	"We Belong Together"	Best Female R&B Vocal Performance	Won	
Grammy Awards	2006	"It's Like That"	Best Female Pop Vocal Performance	Nominated	
Grammy Awards	2006	"Mine Again"	Best Traditional R&B Vocal Performance	Nominated	
Grammy Awards	2007	"Don't Forget About Us"	Best R&B Song	Nominated	
Grammy Awards	2007	"Don't Forget About Us"	Best Female R&B Vocal Performance	Nominated	
Grammy Awards	2009	"I Understand" (with Kim Burrell, Rance Allen & Bebe Winans)	Best Gospel Performance	Nominated	
Hungarian Music Awards	2009	E=MC²	Best Foreign Dance-Pop Album	Won	
IFPI Platinum Europe Awards	1996	Daydream	Platinum Europe Award	Won	
IFPI Platinum Europe Awards	1996	Merry Christmas	Platinum Europe Award	Won	
IFPI Platinum Europe Awards	1997	Butterfly	Platinum Europe Award	Won	
IFPI Platinum Europe Awards	1998	#1's	Platinum Europe Award	Won	
IFPI Platinum Europe Awards	1999	Rainbow	Platinum Europe Award	Won	
IFPI Platinum Europe Awards	2003	#1's (2x)	Platinum Europe Award	Won	
IFPI Platinum Europe Awards	2005	The Emancipation of Mimi	Platinum Europe Award	Won	
iHeartRadio Music Awards	2025	Herself	iHeartRadio Icon Award	Won	
Japan Golden Disc Awards	1995	Herself	International Artist of the Year	Won	
Japan Golden Disc Awards	1996	Herself	International Artist of the Year	Won	
Japan Golden Disc Awards	1996	Daydream	International Pop Album of the Year	Won	
Japan Golden Disc Awards	1998	Butterfly	International Pop Album of the Year	Won	
Japan Golden Disc Awards	1999	#1's	International Pop Album of the Year	Won	
Japan Golden Disc Awards	2000	Rainbow	International Pop Album of the Year	Won	
Japan Golden Disc Awards	2003	Charmbracelet	Pop & Rock Album of the Year	Won	
Juno Awards	1997	Daydream	Best Selling Album (Foreign or Domestic)	Nominated	
MTV Europe Music Awards	1994	Herself	Best Female	Won	
MTV Europe Music Awards	1999	Herself	Best R&B	Nominated	
MTV Europe Music Awards	2001	Herself	Best Female	Nominated	
MTV Europe Music Awards	2005	Herself	Best Female	Nominated	
MTV Europe Music Awards	2005	Herself	Best R&B	Nominated	
MTV TRL Awards	2003	Herself	Best Free Ride	Won	
MTV TRL Awards	2006	Herself	TRL's 1s Lady	Won	
MTV Video Music Awards	1996	"One Sweet Day" (with Boyz II Men)	Best R&B Video	Nominated	
MTV Video Music Awards	1998	"Honey" (Remix)	Best Female Video	Nominated	
MTV Video Music Awards	2003	"I Know What You Want" (with Busta Rhymes)	Best Hip-Hop Video	Nominated	
MTV Video Music Awards	2005	"We Belong Together"	Best Female Video	Nominated	
MTV Video Music Awards	2005	"We Belong Together"	Best R&B Video	Nominated	
MTV Video Music Awards	2006	"Shake It Off"	Best R&B Video	Nominated	
MTV Video Music Awards	2008	"Touch My Body"	Best Female Video	Nominated	
MTV Video Music Awards	2022	"Big Energy" (Remix) (with Latto)	Song of the Summer	Nominated	
MTV Video Music Awards	2025	"Type Dangerous"	Best R&B Video	Won	
MTV Immies	2005	Herself	Best International Female Pop Act	Won	
Music Week Awards	2021	Herself	Catalogue Marketing Campaign	Nominated	
Myx Music Awards	2006	"We Belong Together"	International Music Video	Won	
NAACP Image Awards	1996	Herself	Outstanding Female Artist	Nominated	
NAACP Image Awards	1996	"One Sweet Day" (as part of Fantasy, with Boyz II Men)	Outstanding Performance in a Variety Serials/Specials	Nominated	
NAACP Image Awards	1998	Herself	Outstanding Female Artist	Nominated	
NAACP Image Awards	1999	Number 1's	Outstanding Album	Nominated	
NAACP Image Awards	1999	"When You Believe" (with Whitney Houston)	Outstanding Duo or Group	Won	
NAACP Image Awards	1999	"When You Believe" (with Whitney Houston)	Outstanding Music Video	Nominated	
NAACP Image Awards	1999	"When You Believe" (with Whitney Houston)	Outstanding Song	Nominated	
NAACP Image Awards	2006	Herself	Outstanding Female Artist	Nominated	
NAACP Image Awards	2006	The Emancipation of Mimi	Outstanding Album	Won	
NAACP Image Awards	2006	"We Belong Together"	Outstanding Song	Nominated	
NAACP Image Awards	2006	"We Belong Together"	Outstanding Music Video	Nominated	
NAACP Image Awards	2009	Herself	Outstanding Female Artist	Nominated	
NAACP Image Awards	2010	Memoirs of an Imperfect Angel	Outstanding Album	Nominated	
NAACP Image Awards	2010	Herself in Precious	Outstanding Supporting Actress in a Motion Picture	Nominated	
NAACP Image Awards	2014	"#Beautiful" (with Miguel)	Outstanding Duo or Group	Nominated	
NAACP Image Awards	2026	"Jesus I Do" (with The Clark Sisters)	Outstanding Duo, Group or Collaboration (Traditional)	Nominated	
NAACP Image Awards	2026	"Jesus I Do" (with The Clark Sisters)	Outstanding Gospel/Christian Song	Nominated	
NARM Awards	1996	Daydream	Best Selling R&B Recording	Won	
NARM Awards	1996	"Fantasy"	Best Selling Dance Recording	Won	
NRJ Music Awards	2000	Herself	International Female Artist of the Year	Won	
Otto Bravo Magazine Awards	1994	Herself	Best Female Artist (Note: The Otto Bravo Magazine Awards rank the winners of the awards with Gold, Silver and Bronze positioning. Carey won the Gold award in 1994, Silver awards in 1995 and 1997, and the Bronze award in 1996. She did not receive any position in 1998.)	Won	
Otto Bravo Magazine Awards	1995	Herself	Best Female Artist	Won	
Otto Bravo Magazine Awards	1996	Herself	Best Female Artist	Won	
Otto Bravo Magazine Awards	1997	Herself	Best Female Artist	Won	
Otto Bravo Magazine Awards	1998	Herself	Best Female Artist	Nominated	
Palm Springs International Film Festival	2010	Herself in Precious	Breakthrough Performance Award	Won	
People's Choice Awards	1996	Herself	Favorite Female Musical Performer	Nominated	
Screen Actors Guild	2009	Cast of Precious	Outstanding Performance by a Cast in a Motion Picture	Nominated	
Screen Actors Guild	2013	Cast of The Butler	Outstanding Performance by a Cast in a Motion Picture	Nominated	
Soul Train Music Awards	1991	Herself	Best R&B/Soul or Rap New Artist	Won	
Soul Train Music Awards	1991	Mariah Carey	Best R&B/Soul Album, Female	Won	
Soul Train Music Awards	1991	"Vision of Love"	Best R&B/Soul Song of the Year	Nominated	
Soul Train Music Awards	1991	"Vision of Love"	Best R&B/Soul Single, Female	Won	
Soul Train Music Awards	1992	Emotions	Best R&B/Soul Album, Female	Nominated	
Soul Train Music Awards	1993	MTV Unplugged EP	Best R&B/Soul Album, Female	Nominated	
Soul Train Music Awards	1994	Music Box	Best R&B/Soul Album, Female	Nominated	
Soul Train Music Awards	1996	Daydream	Best R&B/Soul Album, Female	Nominated	
Soul Train Music Awards	2000	"Heartbreaker" (with Jay-Z)	Best R&B/Soul Single, Female	Nominated	
Soul Train Music Awards	2006	The Emancipation of Mimi	Best R&B/Soul Album, Female	Won	
Soul Train Music Awards	2006	"We Belong Together"	Best R&B Soul Single, Female	Won	
Soul Train Music Awards	2018	Herself	Best R&B/Soul Female Artist	Nominated	
Stellar Awards	2026	Contemporary Duo/Chorus Group of the Year	"Jesus I Do" (with the Clark Sisters)	Nominated	
Stinkers Bad Movie Awards	2001	Herself in Glitter	Worst Actress	Won	
Stinkers Bad Movie Awards	2001	"Loverboy"	Worst Song in a Film	Won	
Stinkers Bad Movie Awards	2001	Herself and Max Beesley	Worst On-Screen Couple	Nominated	
Teen Choice Awards	2005	Herself	Choice Music: R&B Artist	Won	
Teen Choice Awards	2005	"We Belong Together"	Choice Music: Love Song	Won	
Tony Awards	2023	Some Like it Hot	Best Musical	Nominated	
Vibe Awards	2005	Herself	Artist of The Year	Won	
Vibe Awards	2005	Herself	R&B Voice of The Year	Won	
Vibe Awards	2005	The Emancipation of Mimi	Album of The Year	Won	
Vibe Awards	2005	We Belong Together	Best R&B Song	Won	
World Music Awards	1995	Herself	Best Selling American Recording Artist	Won	
World Music Awards	1995	Herself	Best Selling Pop Artist	Won	
World Music Awards	1996	Herself	Best Selling Overall Female Recording Artist	Won	
World Music Awards	1996	Herself	Best Selling American Female Recording Artist	Won	
World Music Awards	1996	Herself	Best Selling Female Pop Artist	Won	
World Music Awards	1996	Herself	Best Selling Female R&B Artist	Won	
World Music Awards	1998	Herself	Best Selling Female R&B Artist	Won	
World Music Awards	2000	Herself	Best Selling R&B Female	Won	
World Music Awards	2005	Herself	Female Entertainer of the Year	Won	
World Music Awards	2005	Herself	Best Selling Pop Female Artist	Won	
World Music Awards	2005	Herself	Best Selling R&B Artist	Won	
World Music Awards	2005	Herself	Best Selling American Artist	Won	
World Music Awards	2008	Herself	Best Selling R&B Female Artist	Nominated	
World Music Awards	2014	Herself	Pop Icon Award	Won	
World Music Awards	2014	Herself	World's Best Female Artist	Nominated	
World Music Awards	2014	Herself	Solo Artist with the Most Number One Singles in America	Won	
World Music Awards	2014	Herself	World's Best Live Act	Nominated	
World Music Awards	2014	Herself	World's Best Entertainer of the Year	Nominated	
XM Nation Music Awards	2005	Herself	Best Comeback of The Year	Won	

== Other awards ==
=== Cultural honors ===
Name of the honor, year the honor was awarded, category and type of honor
Honor	Year	Category	Type	Ref.
African-American Film Critics Association	2021	Special Achievement Innovator Award	Honoree	
American Black Achievement Awards	1991	Career Achievement Award	Honoree	
American Heroes Awards	2002	Ongoing contributions to The Fresh Air Fund	Honoree	
American Music Awards	2000	Achievement Award	Honoree	
American Music Awards	2008	Honorary Award (Note: Both ceremonies, American Music Awards & World Music Awards, gave Mariah a Special Achievement Award for most number one singles (18 at the time) achieved by any female solo recording artist.)	Honoree	
BET Honors	2012	Entertainer Award	Inducted	
BET Awards	2025	Ultimate Icon Award	Honoree	
Billboard Music Awards	2019	Billboard Icon Award	Honoree	
BMI Urban Awards	2012	BMI Icon Award	Honoree	
Congressional Award	1999	Congressional Horizon Award (Note: Honored for her youth-related charity work with The Fresh Air Fund's Camp Mariah.)	Honoree	
GLAAD Media Award	2016	GLAAD Ally Award	Honoree	
Goldmine Hall of Fame	2012	Goldmine Hall of Fame	Inducted	
Grammy Awards	2024	Grammy Global Impact Award	Honoree	
Grio Awards	2023	Music Icon Award	Honoree	
Hollywood Walk of Fame	2015	Star on Hollywood Walk of Fame (Note: Honored for achievements in the recording industry.)	Honoree	
Ivor Novello Awards	2019	PRS for Music Special International Award (Note: Honored for achievements in songwriting, recognising her impact on British music and internationally.)	Honoree	
Library of Congress	2023	National Recording Registry (for "All I Want for Christmas Is You")	Inducted	
The Long Island Music and Entertainment Hall of Fame	2008	The Long Island Music and Entertainment Hall of Fame	Inducted	
Make-A-Wish Foundation	2005	Wish Icon Award (Note: Honored for "her extraordinary generosity and her many wish granting achievements throughout her career".)	Honoree	
MTV Video Music Awards	2025	Video Vanguard Award	Honoree	
MTV Video Music Awards Japan	2008	Video Vanguard Award	Honoree	
MusiCares	2026	MusiCares Person of the Year	Honoree	
New York Chapter Recording Academy	2005	Outstanding achievements	Honoree	
NRJ Music Awards	2020	Icon Award	Honoree	
PETA	2017	Angel for Animals Award (Note: Honored for promoting animal adoption through her 2017 movie All I Want For Christmas Is You.)	Honoree	
RIAA	2003	RIAA Certification Award for more than 100 Gold, Platinum and multi-Platinum certifications	Honoree	
Songwriters Hall of Fame	2022	Songwriters Hall of Fame	Inducted	
Soul Train Music Awards	2003	Quincy Jones Award	Honoree	
Variety's Power of Women	2019	Power of Women Award	Honoree	
VH1 Hip Hop Honors	2017	90's Game Changer	Honoree	
World Music Awards	1995	Best Selling World Recording Artist	Honoree	
World Music Awards	2000	Best Selling Female Artist of the Millennium	Honoree	
World Music Awards	2003	Chopard Diamond Award (Note: Honored for over 100 million album sales worldwide and she was the first female ever to receive the award.)	Honoree	
World Music Awards	2008	Special Achievement Award	Honoree	
World Music Awards	2014	Legend Award (Note: Honored for being the artist with the most number one singles in America.)	Honoree	

=== World records ===
Name of publication, year the record was awarded, record holder and name of the record
Publication	Year	Record holder	World record	R. Status	Ref.
Guinness World Records	2000	Herself	Most consecutive years charting a number-one single on US Singles Chart	Record	
Guinness World Records	2000	Herself	Largest Record Deal (Virgin/EMI)	Record	
Guinness World Records	2002	Herself	Greatest pay off for a music artist	Record	
Guinness World Records	2010	"I Want To Know What Love Is"	Most weeks at No.1 in Brazil (single)	Record	
Guinness World Records	2019	"All I Want for Christmas Is You"	Highest-charting holiday (Christmas) song on the Billboard US Hot 100 by a solo artist	Record	
Guinness World Records	2019	"All I Want for Christmas Is You"	Highest-charting holiday (Christmas/New Year) song on the Billboard US Hot 100	Record	
Guinness World Records	2019	"All I Want for Christmas Is You"	Most streamed track on Spotify in 24 hours (female)	Record	
Guinness World Records	2019	"All I Want for Christmas Is You"	Most weeks in the UK singles Top 10 chart for a Christmas song	Record	
Guinness World Records	2019	Herself	Most US No.1 singles by a female artist	Record	
Guinness World Records	2020	Herself	Most cumulative weeks at No.1 on US singles chart	Record	
Guinness World Records	2020	Herself	First solo artist to achieve US No.1 singles in four decades	Record	
Guinness World Records	2020	Herself	Longest span between No.1s on the US singles chart	Record	
Guinness World Records	2025	"All I Want for Christmas Is You"	Most cumulative weeks on the UK Official Singles Chart by a female artist (one song)	Record	
