= 2001 Stinkers Bad Movie Awards =

Award ceremony presented by the Stinkers Bad Movie Awards in 2006

24th Stinkers Bad Movie Awards
- Date: 2002

Highlights
- Worst Film: Freddy Got Fingered
- Most awards: Freddy Got Fingered (5)
- Most nominations: Freddy Got Fingered (7)

The 24th Stinkers Bad Movie Awards were released by the Hastings Bad Cinema Society in 2002 to honour the worst films the film industry had to offer in 2001. Freddy Got Fingered received the most nominations with seven. All nominees and winners, with respective percentages of votes for each category, are listed below. Dishonourable mentions are also featured for Worst Picture (61 total).

== Winners and nominees ==
=== Worst Film ===
Recipient	Percentage of Votes
Freddy Got Fingered (Fox)	46%
Glitter (Fox, Sony)	27%
Pearl Harbor (Touchstone)	18%
3000 Miles to Graceland (Warner Bros.)	6%
Town & Country (New Line)	3%

==== Dishonourable Mentions ====
- A.I. Artificial Intelligence (Warner Bros.)
- American Outlaws (Warner Bros.)
- The Animal (Sony)
- Blow (New Line)
- Bones (New Line)
- Bubble Boy (Touchstone)
- Captain Corelli's Mandolin (Universal)
- Corky Romano (Touchstone)
- Crocodile Dundee in Los Angeles (Paramount)
- Double Take (Touchstone)
- Dr. Dolittle 2 (Fox)
- Driven (Warner Bros.)
- Evolution (DreamWorks)
- 15 Minutes (New Line)
- Ghosts of Mars (Sony)
- The Glass House (Sony)
- Hannibal (MGM)
- How High (Universal)
- I Am Sam (New Line)
- Jay and Silent Bob Strike Back (Miramax)
- Jeepers Creepers (MGM)
- Joe Dirt (Sony)
- Joe Somebody (Fox)
- Jurassic Park III (Universal)
- A Knight's Tale (Sony)
- Lara Croft: Tomb Raider (Paramount)
- Left Behind (Cloud Ten)
- Lord of the Rings: The Fellowship of the Ring (New Line)
- The Majestic (Warner Bros.)
- The Man Who Wasn't There (USA)
- Megiddo: The Omega Code 2 (TBN)
- Memento (Newmarket)
- The Mexican (DreamWorks)
- Monkeybone (Fox)
- Moulin Rouge! (Fox)
- Mulholland Drive (Universal)
- The Mummy Returns (Universal)
- The Musketeer (Universal)
- Not Another Teen Movie (Sony)
- O (Lionsgate)
- On the Line (Miramax)
- The One (Sony)
- One Night at McCool's (USA)
- Original Sin (MGM)
- Planet of the Apes (Fox)
- Pokémon 3 (Toho)
- Pootie Tang (Paramount)
- Rat Race (Paramount)
- The Royal Tenenbaums (Touchstone)
- Say It Isn't So (Fox)
- Scary Movie 2 (Dimension)
- Serendipity (Miramax)
- Summer Catch (Warner Bros.)
- Sweet November (Warner Bros.)
- Swordfish (Warner Bros.)
- Tomcats (Sony)
- Valentine (Warner Bros.)
- Vanilla Sky (Paramount)
- The Wash (Lionsgate)
- What's the Worst That Could Happen? (MGM)
- Zoolander (Paramount)

=== Worst Director ===
Recipient	Percentage of Votes
Tom Green for Freddy Got Fingered	40%
Michael Bay for Pearl Harbor	17%
Tim Burton for Planet of the Apes	13%
Peter Chelsom with unwanted assistance from Warren Beatty for Town & Country	21%
Renny Harlin for Driven	9%

=== Worst Actor ===
Recipient	Percentage of Votes
Tom Green in Freddy Got Fingered	48%
Kevin Costner in 3000 Miles to Graceland	13%
Steven Seagal in Exit Wounds	9%
David Spade in Joe Dirt	12%
Sylvester Stallone in Driven	15%

=== Worst Actress ===
Recipient	Percentage of Votes
Mariah Carey in Glitter	61%
Penélope Cruz in Blow, Captain Corelli's Mandolin, and Vanilla Sky	12%
Angelina Jolie in Original Sin	9%
Téa Leoni in Jurassic Park III	8%
Jennifer Lopez in Angel Eyes and The Wedding Planner	10%

=== Worst Supporting Actor ===
Recipient	Percentage of Votes
The Rock in The Mummy Returns	40%
Jake Busey in Tomcats	10%
Joey Fatone in On the Line	24%
Cuba Gooding, Jr. in Rat Race	12%
Sisqo in Get Over It	19%

=== Worst Supporting Actress ===
Recipient	Percentage of Votes
Tori Spelling in Scary Movie 2	29%
Courteney Cox in 3000 Miles to Graceland	15%
Shannon Elizabeth in American Pie 2, Jay and Silent Bob Strike Back, 13 Ghosts, and Tomcats	19%
Whoopi Goldberg in Monkeybone and Rat Race	16%
Estella Warren in Driven and Planet of the Apes	21%

=== Worst Screenplay for a Film Grossing More Than $100M Worldwide Using Hollywood Math ===
Recipient	Percentage of Votes
Pearl Harbor (Touchstone), written by Randall Wallace	39%
Final Fantasy: The Spirits Within (Sony), story by Hironobu Sakaguchi; screenplay by Al Reinert and Jeff Vintar; based on the Final Fantasy franchise	10%
Jurassic Park III (Universal), written by Peter Buchman, Alexander Payne, and Jim Taylor	11%
Lara Croft: Tomb Raider (Paramount), story by Sara B. Cooper, Mike Werb, and Michael Colleary; screenplay by Patrick Massett and John Zinman; based on the Tomb Raider franchise	19%
Planet of the Apes (Fox), written by William Broyles Jr., Lawrence Konner, and Mark Rosenthal; based on the novel Planet of the Apes	21%

=== Most Painfully Unfunny Comedy ===
Recipient	Percentage of Votes
Freddy Got Fingered (Fox)	54%
Joe Dirt (Sony)	10%
Pootie Tang (Paramount)	15%
Scary Movie 2 (Dimension)	7%
Town & Country (New Line)	14%

=== Worst Sequel ===
Recipient	Percentage of Votes
Crocodile Dundee in Los Angeles (Paramount)	38%
Hannibal (MGM)	13%
Jurassic Park III (Universal)	12%
Pokémon 3 (Toho)	18%
Scary Movie 2 (Dimension)	19%

=== Worst Song in a Film or Its End Credits ===
Recipient	Percentage of Votes
"Loverboy" by Mariah Carey from Glitter	29%
"Because I Got High" by Afroman from Jay and Silent Bob Strike Back	10%
"Lady Marmalade" by Christina Aguilera, et al. from Moulin Rouge	20%
""Pootie Tangin'" by 702 from Pootie Tang	13%
"The Sausage Song" by Tom Green from Freddy Got Fingered	27%

=== Most Intrusive Musical Score ===
Recipient	Percentage of Votes
The Fast and the Furious (Universal)	31%
America's Sweethearts (Sony)	12%
Freddy Got Fingered (Fox)	26%
John Carpenter's Ghosts of Mars (Sony)	13%
Harry Potter and the Sorcerer's Stone (Warner Bros.)	21%

=== Worst On-Screen Couple ===
Recipient	Percentage of Votes
Tom Green and any person, animal or foreign object in Freddy Got Fingered	38%
Woody Allen and any actress decades younger in The Curse of the Jade Scorpion	21%
Lance Bass and Joey Fatone, or any combination of two NSYNC members in On the Line	15%
Mariah Carey and Max Beesley in Glitter	16%
Penelope Cruz and Nicolas Cage, Tom Cruise or Johnny Depp in Blow, Captain Corelli's Mandolin, and Vanilla Sky	10%

=== Most Annoying On-Screen Group ===
Recipient	Percentage of Votes
Josie and the Pussycats in Josie and the Pussycats	33%
What Appears To Be The Cast of Michael Jackson's "Thriller" Posing As "Martians" in John Carpenter's Ghosts of Mars	26%
The Elvis Impersonators in 3000 Miles to Graceland	19%
The Lucy Impersonators That Don't Look Anything Like Lucille Ball in Rat Race	18%
The Supermodels in Head Over Heels	9%

=== Worst On-Screen Hairstyle ===
Recipient	Percentage of Votes
David Spade in Joe Dirt	51%
Jake Gyllenhaal in Bubble Boy	8%
Samuel L. Jackson in The Caveman's Valentine	10%
Sisqo in Get Over It	16%
Owen Wilson in Zoolander	10%

=== Most Annoying Fake Accent (Male) ===
Recipient	Percentage of Votes
Nicolas Cage in Captain Corelli's Mandolin	32%
Hank Azaria in America's Sweethearts	24%
Justin Chambers in The Wedding Planner	7%
Freddie Prinze, Jr. in Summer Catch	16%
Shane West in Get Over It	21%

=== Most Annoying Fake Accent (Female) ===
Recipient	Percentage of Votes
Jennifer Lopez in Angel Eyes	35%
Courteney Cox in 3000 Miles to Graceland	25%
Shannon Elizabeth in American Pie 2	22%
Rachel Griffiths in Blow	6%
Sigourney Weaver in Heartbreakers	12%

=== Most Unwelcome Direct-to-Video Release ===
Recipient	Percentage of Votes
Children of the Corn: Revelation	29%
Beethoven's 4th	28%
House Party 4	18%
Pokémon: Mewtwo Returns	16%
Tremors 3: Back to Perfection	9%

=== The Founders Award ("What Were They Thinking?") ===
- Sony Pictures and its fictitious movie critic David Manning

== Films with multiple wins and nominations ==
The following films received multiple nominations:

Nominations	Film
7	Freddy Got Fingered
5	3000 Miles to Graceland
4	Glitter
3	Blow
3	Captain Corelli's Mandolin
3	Driven
3	Get Over It
3	Joe Dirt
3	Jurassic Park III
3	Pearl Harbor
3	Planet of the Apes
3	Rat Race
3	Scary Movie 2
3	Town & Country
2	America's Sweethearts
2	American Pie 2
2	Angel Eyes
2	Ghosts of Mars
2	Jay and Silent Bob Strike Back
2	On the Line
2	Pootie Tang
2	Tomcats
2	Vanilla Sky
2	The Wedding Planner

The following films received multiple wins:

Wins	Film
5	Freddy Got Fingered
2	Glitter
