= 22nd Golden Raspberry Awards =

Award ceremony presented by the Golden Raspberry Award Foundation in 2001

- Date: March 23, 2002
- Site: Abracadabra Theater at Magicopolis, Santa Monica, California

Highlights
- Worst Picture: Freddy Got Fingered
- Most awards: Freddy Got Fingered (5)
- Most nominations: Freddy Got Fingered (8)

The 22nd Golden Raspberry Awards were held on March 23, 2002 at the Abracadabra Theater at Magicopolis in Santa Monica, California, to recognize the worst the movie industry had to offer in 2001.

== Ceremony ==
In a break with Razzie tradition, Tom Green accepted his five awards in person for Freddy Got Fingered, entertaining attendees via supplying his own red carpet and playing a never-ending harmonica piece.

== Awards and nominations ==
Winner (in bold)

Category		Recipient
Worst Picture		**Freddy Got Fingered (Fox)**
Worst Picture		Driven (Warner Bros.)
Worst Picture		Glitter (Fox/Columbia)
Worst Picture		Pearl Harbor (Touchstone)
Worst Picture		3000 Miles to Graceland (Warner Bros.)
Worst Actor	Tom Green	**Tom Green in Freddy Got Fingered as Gordon "Gord" Brody**
Worst Actor	Tom Green	Ben Affleck in Pearl Harbor as Capt. Rafe McCawley
Worst Actor	Tom Green	Kevin Costner in 3000 Miles to Graceland as Thomas J. Murphy
Worst Actor	Tom Green	Keanu Reeves in Hardball and Sweet November as Conor O'Neill and Nelson Moss (respectively)
Worst Actor	Tom Green	John Travolta in Domestic Disturbance and Swordfish as Frank Morrison and Gabriel Shear (respectively)
Worst Actress	Mariah Carey	**Mariah Carey in Glitter as Billie Frank**
Worst Actress	Mariah Carey	Penélope Cruz in Blow, Captain Corelli's Mandolin and Vanilla Sky as Mirtha Jung, Pelagia and Sofia Serrano (respectively)
Worst Actress	Mariah Carey	Angelina Jolie in Lara Croft: Tomb Raider and Original Sin as Lara Croft and Julia Russell/Bonny Castle (respectively)
Worst Actress	Mariah Carey	Jennifer Lopez in Angel Eyes and The Wedding Planner as Sharon Pogue and Mary Fiore (respectively)
Worst Actress	Mariah Carey	Charlize Theron in Sweet November as Sara Deever
Worst Supporting Actor	Charlton Heston	**Charlton Heston in Cats & Dogs, Planet of the Apes (cameo) and Town & Country as The Mastiff, Zaius and Mr. Claiborne (respectively)**
Worst Supporting Actor	Charlton Heston	Max Beesley in Glitter as Julian "Dice" Black
Worst Supporting Actor	Charlton Heston	Burt Reynolds in Driven as Carl Henry
Worst Supporting Actor	Charlton Heston	Sylvester Stallone in Driven as Joe Tanto
Worst Supporting Actor	Charlton Heston	Rip Torn in Freddy Got Fingered as Jim Brody
Worst Supporting Actress	Estella Warren	**Estella Warren in Driven and Planet of the Apes as Sophia Simone and Daena (respectively)**
Worst Supporting Actress	Estella Warren	Drew Barrymore in Freddy Got Fingered as Davidson's Receptionist
Worst Supporting Actress	Estella Warren	Courteney Cox in 3000 Miles to Graceland as Cybil Waingrow
Worst Supporting Actress	Estella Warren	Julie Hagerty in Freddy Got Fingered as Julie Brody
Worst Supporting Actress	Estella Warren	Goldie Hawn in Town & Country as Mona Morris
Worst Screen Couple	Tom Green	**Tom Green and any animal he abuses in Freddy Got Fingered**
Worst Screen Couple	Tom Green	Ben Affleck and either Kate Beckinsale or Josh Hartnett in Pearl Harbor
Worst Screen Couple	Tom Green	Mariah Carey's cleavage in Glitter
Worst Screen Couple	Tom Green	Burt Reynolds and Sylvester Stallone in Driven
Worst Screen Couple	Tom Green	Kurt Russell and either Kevin Costner or Courteney Cox in 3000 Miles to Graceland
Worst Remake or Sequel		**Planet of the Apes (Fox)**
Worst Remake or Sequel		Crocodile Dundee in Los Angeles (Paramount)
Worst Remake or Sequel		Jurassic Park III (Universal)
Worst Remake or Sequel		Pearl Harbor (Touchstone)
Worst Remake or Sequel		Sweet November (Warner Bros.)
Worst Director	Tom Green	**Tom Green for Freddy Got Fingered**
Worst Director	Tom Green	Michael Bay for Pearl Harbor
Worst Director	Tom Green	Peter Chelsom (with Warren Beatty) for Town & Country
Worst Director	Tom Green	Vondie Curtis-Hall for Glitter
Worst Director	Tom Green	Renny Harlin for Driven
Worst Screenplay	Tom Green Derek Harvie	**Freddy Got Fingered, written by Tom Green and Derek Harvie**
Worst Screenplay	Tom Green Derek Harvie	Driven, screenplay by Sylvester Stallone, story by Jan Skrentny and Neal Tabachnick
Worst Screenplay	Tom Green Derek Harvie	Glitter, screenplay by Kate Lanier, story by Cheryl L. West
Worst Screenplay	Tom Green Derek Harvie	Pearl Harbor, written by Randall Wallace
Worst Screenplay	Tom Green Derek Harvie	3000 Miles to Graceland, written by Richard Recco and Demian Lichtenstein

== Films with multiple nominations ==
These films received multiple nominations:

Nominations	Films
8	Freddy Got Fingered
7	Driven
6	Glitter
6	Pearl Harbor
5	3000 Miles to Graceland
3	Planet of the Apes
3	Sweet November
3	Town & Country

== See also ==
- 2001 in film
- 74th Academy Awards
- 55th British Academy Film Awards
- 59th Golden Globe Awards
- 8th Screen Actors Guild Awards
