= The Ridgefield Press =

American weekly local newspaper

- Type: Weekly newspaper, published Thursdays
- Format: Broadsheet, digital
- Owner(s): Hearst Media, part of Hearst CT Media Group
- Editor: Mack Reid, Tim Murphy, Tom Nash (Managing Editor)
- Founded: 1875
- Headquarters: 345 Main Street, 2nd Floor Danbury, CT 06810 United States
- Circulation: 4,753
- OCLC number: 12248013
- Website: theridgefieldpress.com

The Ridgefield Press is an American weekly newspaper published each Thursday for Ridgefield, Connecticut. The newspaper was established in 1875, and has a paid circulation of about 4,753 copies.

It is currently owned by Hearst Media, which publishes the Press and seven other weekly newspapers in Fairfield County, Connecticut and Westchester County, New York.

The fictitious film critic David Manning was supposedly writing for The Ridgefield Press.
