= Freddy Got Fingered =

2001 American film directed by Tom Green

- Theatrical release poster
- Directed by: Tom Green
- Written by: Tom Green; Derek Harvie
- Produced by: Larry Brezner; Howard Lapides; Lauren Lloyd
- Starring: Tom Green; Rip Torn; Marisa Coughlan; Eddie Kaye Thomas; Julie Hagerty
- Cinematography: Mark Irwin
- Edited by: Jacqueline Cambas
- Music by: Mike Simpson
- Production companies: Regency Enterprises; New Regency Productions; MBST
- Distributed by: 20th Century Fox
- Release date: April 20, 2001
- Running time: 87 minutes
- Country: United States
- Language: English
- Budget: $14 million
- Box office: $14.3 million

Freddy Got Fingered is a 2001 American surreal black comedy film directed by Tom Green and written by Green and Derek Harvie. The film stars Green alongside Rip Torn, Marisa Coughlan, Eddie Kaye Thomas and Julie Hagerty. The plot follows a childish slacker who wishes to become a professional cartoonist while dealing with his abusive father's behavior. The title of the film refers to a plot point where Green's character falsely accuses his father of sexually abusing his brother, the eponymous Freddy.

The film also contained animated sequences by Chris Prynoski and his animation studio Titmouse Productions. Before release, the film was moderately toned down to secure an R-rating from the MPAA after the film received an NC-17, per request from the studio. A scene that featured an alternative ending to the film was released as an extra on the film's DVD as a result.

Released in the United States on April 20, 2001 by 20th Century Fox, the film was overwhelmingly panned by critics at the time, with many complaints about its gross-out humor. Some also referred to it as one of the worst films of all time. While initially a box-office flop, grossing $14.3 million against its $14 million budget, it later became profitable after its release on home video. It received five Golden Raspberry Awards of its eight nominations, as well as a Dallas-Fort Worth Film Critics Association Award for Worst Picture. Despite the film's poor initial reception, it has since garnered some positive critical re-evaluation, as well as a cult following.

== Plot ==
Unemployed 28-year-old cartoonist Gordon "Gord" Brody leaves his parents' home in Portland, Oregon, to pursue his lifelong ambition of obtaining a contract for an animated television series. His parents, Jim and Julie, give him a Chrysler LeBaron which he drives to Los Angeles and starts work at a cheese sandwich factory to make money. Gord shows his drawings to Dave Davidson, the CEO of a major animation studio; Davidson commends the artwork but calls the concepts depicted, including a vigilante "X-Ray Cat", nonsensical. Disheartened, Gord quits his job and returns to his parents.

Jim constantly insults and belittles Gord following his return, telling him to forget about being an animator and "get a job". When Gord pressures his friend Darren into skating on a wooden half-pipe he has built outside the Brody home, Darren falls and breaks his leg. At the hospital, Gord impersonates a doctor, delivers a baby, and meets an attractive nurse in a wheelchair named Betty. Gord visits Betty at her home, where she shows him the protoype rocket-powered wheelchair she is working on. Betty initiates a romantic encounter with Gord, and persuades him to beat her legs with a cane for masochistic pleasure. She offers to perform fellatio on him, but he declines and leaves, stating they are moving too fast.

Gord lies to his father that he has got a job in the computer industry. While his father thinks he is at work, Gord takes Betty out to a restaurant. However, Jim encounters him at the restaurant and disparages Gord's deception and laziness along with Betty's disability. After a fight in the restaurant, Gord is arrested and Betty bails him out. Following her advice, Gord attempts to continue drawing; however, he gets into an argument with Jim, who then smashes Gord's half-pipe. Gord and his parents then go to a family therapy session, where Gord falsely accuses his father of fingering Gord's younger brother, Freddy.

The 25-year-old Freddy is sent to a home for sexually molested children despite clearly being an adult. Julie, fed up with Jim's real and perceived behavior, leaves Jim and ends up dating the basketball player Shaquille O'Neal. While in a drunken stupor, Jim tells Gord how much of a disappointment he is to him. Affected by his father's words, Gord decides to abandon his aspirations to be a cartoonist and gets a job at a local sandwich shop.

After seeing a television news report on Betty's successful rocket-powered wheelchair, Gord is inspired to pursue his dreams once again. He returns to Hollywood with a concept based on his relationship with his father: an adult animated series called Zebras in America. Jim follows Gord there after threatening Darren into revealing his whereabouts. While Gord is pitching the show to Davidson, Jim bursts in and trashes Davidson's office.

Thinking Jim's actions are part of Gord's pitch, Davidson greenlights Zebras in America and gives Gord a million-dollar check. Gord spends a quarter of that money on an elaborate thank you to Betty for inspiring him, using a helicopter to deliver jewels to her. She thanks him but says she really only wants to perform fellatio on him. Gord spends the remainder of his windfall to relocate part of the Brody house to Pakistan with his father inside, unconscious—a response to Jim's earlier put-down that "If this were Pakistan, you would have been sewing soccer balls when you were four years old!". A furious Jim chases Gord into a tent, where Gord masturbates a bull elephant and causes it to spray his father with semen.

Gord and Jim soon come to terms, but are then abducted and held hostage. The kidnapping becomes a news item, as Gord's series has already become popular. After 18 months in captivity, Gord and Jim return to the United States, where a huge crowd—including Betty, Darren, and a protestor holding a sign asking “When the fuck is this movie going to end?”—welcomes them home.

== Cast ==
- Tom Green as Gordon "Gord" Brody, a childish 28-year-old slacker cartoonist who dreams of having his own cartoon show.
- Rip Torn as James “Jim” Brody, Gord's short-tempered, blue-collar father who frequently clashes with Gord in response to his slacking and clowning.
- Marisa Coughlan as Betty Menger, Gord's masochist love interest who dreams of developing a rocket-powered wheelchair.
- Eddie Kaye Thomas as Freddy Brody, Gord's responsible younger brother who works at a bank.
- Harland Williams as Darren, Gord's bank teller friend.
- Anthony Michael Hall as Dave Davidson, the head of Radioactive Animation Studios, who Gord seeks to pitch his cartoons to.
- Julie Hagerty as Julie Brody, Gord's mild-mannered mother.
- Drew Barrymore as Davidson's receptionist
- Shaquille O'Neal as himself
- Jackson Davies as Mr. Malloy, the Brodys' next-door neighbor.
- Connor Widdows as Andy Malloy, the accident-prone son of Mr. Malloy who is repeatedly injured during the film as part of a running gag
- Lorena Gale as Psychiatrist/Social worker
- Noel Fisher as Pimply manager
- Stephen Tobolowsky (uncredited) as Uncle Neil
- Joe Flaherty (uncredited) as William

== Production ==
Principal photography took place from August to October 2000, and was mostly shot in Vancouver, while some scenes were shot in Santa Monica, California.

Chris Prynoski, former Beavis and Butt-Head and Daria animator, produced the "Zebras in America" animation segment as the first project for his company, Titmouse Productions.

The theatrical release for the film is 87 minutes and it was received an R rating by the Motion Picture Association of America following requested cuts to tone it down from an NC-17, a rating that Tom Green described as "like porn with murder." As an extra on the DVD release, Green also included a version of the ending, where a small child character gets sliced by the airplane propeller, which he had edited to secure an R rating with a last-minute added ADR dub for a theatrical release. The PG-rated cut of Freddy Got Fingered is only three minutes long with a comedic voiceover. Some footage was leaked by the Newgrounds website two weeks before release. Tom Fulp, owner of Newgrounds, confirmed during that same time that the leak was a marketing stunt.

=== Music ===
Freddy Got Fingered: Original Motion Picture Soundtrack

Soundtrack album by various artists
- Released: April 17, 2001
- Genres: Punk rock; Hardcore punk; Electronic
- Length: 36:37
- Label: Restless Records

The music score was composed by Mike Simpson of the electronic band Dust Brothers, who had previously scored other films such as the 1999 film Fight Club and the 2000 comedy film Road Trip, the latter in which Tom Green also acted. Simpson would go on to collaborate with Green on Tom Green's House Tonight. The soundtrack was released on April 17, 2001 by Restless Records and had consisted of mostly punk rock, hardcore punk and electronic music.

Some of the songs featured in the film, but not on the official soundtrack include "I Just Wanna Love U (Give It 2 Me)" by JAY-Z, "I'd Like to Teach the World to Sing (In Perfect Harmony)" by The New Seekers, "I've Gotta Be Me" by Sammy Davis Jr., and "The Real Slim Shady" by Eminem.

== Release ==
The film had its theatrical release in the United States and Canada on April 20, 2001 by 20th Century Fox. It was also theatrically released in France on May 1, 2002.

=== Home media ===
The film was released on VHS and DVD by 20th Century Fox Home Entertainment on October 23, 2001. Despite its notorious failure at the box office, it did eventually turn a profit from DVD sales earning its cult status. The film earned $24,300,000 from DVD sales, and was among the top 50 weekly DVD rentals chart. Green has stated in a few interviews in 2010 that DVD sales have been growing many years later and that there was a cult following.

== Reception ==
=== Box office ===
On a budget of $14 million, Freddy Got Fingered grossed $14,254,993 domestically and $78,259 overseas for a worldwide total of $14,333,252, making it initially a commercial failure. In a 2017 interview, Green stated that the box office receipts for the film did not reflect the actual attendance, as he thinks that moviegoers under the age of 17 bought tickets to Crocodile Dundee in Los Angeles and then snuck into the theater showing his film.

=== Critical response ===
In this infamous scene, Gord Brody ties sausages hanging from the ceiling to his fingers, plays the piano poorly, and sings "Daddy, would you like some sausage?"

On the review aggregator website Rotten Tomatoes, 12% of 99 critics' reviews are positive, with an average rating of 3.5/10. The website's consensus reads: "Unfavorably comparing it with such infamously bad titles as Battlefield Earth, a significant number of critics are calling Tom Green's extreme gross-out comedy the worst movie they have ever seen." Metacritic, which uses a weighted average, assigned the film a score of 13 out of 100, based on 25 critics, indicating "overwhelming dislike". Audiences polled by CinemaScore gave the film an average grade of "C−" on an A+ to F scale.

CNN's Paul Clinton called it "quite simply the worst movie ever released by a major studio in Hollywood history" and listed the running time as "87 awful minutes." Chicago Sun-Times critic Roger Ebert gave the film a rare zero-star rating and listed it as one of his most hated films of all time, and described the film thus: "This movie doesn't scrape the bottom of the barrel. This movie isn't the bottom of the barrel. This movie isn't below the bottom of the barrel. This movie doesn't deserve to be mentioned in the same sentence with barrels. […] The day may come when Freddy Got Fingered is seen as a milestone of neo-surrealism. The day may never come when it is seen as funny."

Along with Ebert, his At the Movies co-host, Richard Roeper, called it "horrible" and expressed the view that Green was a poor comedian, saying that "he should be flipping burgers somewhere". Roeper was also offended by the numerous "gross-out" gags. In 2003, Roeper put it on his list of his forty least favorite films of all time to that point, reiterating his dislike of Green's comedy in general.

Film critic Leonard Maltin gave Freddy Got Fingered a "BOMB" rating in his book Leonard Maltin's Movie Guide. He expressed views of the film similar to those of Ebert and Roeper: "Instantly notorious word-of-mouth debacle became the poster child for all that's wrong with movie comedy. […] Gags include the maiming of an innocent child and a newborn spun around in the air by its umbilical cord—compounded by the almost unimaginable ineptitude with which they're executed."

In 2017, the film critic of The Guardian, Peter Bradshaw, cited it as the worst film he had ever seen. Likewise, James Berardinelli, who had given the film a zero-star rating upon its release and stated that he had "gotten better entertainment value from a colonoscopy," said in 2008 that it was his least favourite film of all time.

David Stratton and Margaret Pomeranz of SBS' The Movie Show were not impressed by the film's content and tone. Stratton gave the film zero stars while Pomeranz gave it one star. The magazine Complex included the film in its listicle, "25 Movies That Killed Careers". A. O. Scott of The New York Times compared the film to conceptual performance art and praised it "guardedly and with a slightly guilty conscience".

=== Accolades ===
The film received eight Golden Raspberry Award nominations in 2002, winning five. In acknowledgment of the critical consensus regarding the film's merits, Green personally appeared at the ceremony to accept his awards, bringing his own red carpet and saying: "I'd just like to say to all the other nominees in the audience: I don't think that I deserve it any more than the rest of you. I'd like to say that; I don't think that it would be true, though." Green would go on to play the harmonica badly for so long that he was dragged off the stage. In February 2005, it received a special nomination for "Worst 'Comedy' of Our First 25 Years", losing to 2003's Gigli. In February 2010, it was announced that Freddy Got Fingered was nominated for "Worst Picture of the Decade" for the 30th Golden Raspberry Awards but "lost" to Battlefield Earth. Freddy Got Fingered also garnered seven nominations at the 2001 Stinkers Bad Movie Awards, five of which were wins. Following his wins, The Stinkers went ahead and designed their very own trophy for him to collect.

Date	Award	Category	Recipients	Result	Ref.
2002	Stinkers Bad Movie Awards	Worst Picture	Freddy Got Fingered (20th Century Fox)	Won	
2002	Stinkers Bad Movie Awards	Worst Director	Tom Green	Won	
2002	Stinkers Bad Movie Awards	Worst Actor	Tom Green	Won	
2002	Stinkers Bad Movie Awards	Most Painfully Unfunny Comedy	Freddy Got Fingered (20th Century Fox)	Won	
2002	Stinkers Bad Movie Awards	Worst Song in a Film or Its End Credits	"The Sausage Song" by Tom Green	Nominated	
2002	Stinkers Bad Movie Awards	Most Intrusive Musical Score	Freddy Got Fingered (20th Century Fox)	Nominated	
2002	Stinkers Bad Movie Awards	Worst On-Screen Couple	Tom Green and any person, animal, or foreign object	Won	
January 3, 2002	Dallas–Fort Worth Film Critics Association	Worst Film	Freddy Got Fingered (20th Century Fox)	Won	
March 23, 2002	Golden Raspberry Awards	Worst Picture	Freddy Got Fingered (20th Century Fox)	Won	
March 23, 2002	Golden Raspberry Awards	Worst Actor	Tom Green	Won	
March 23, 2002	Golden Raspberry Awards	Worst Supporting Actor	Rip Torn	Nominated	
March 23, 2002	Golden Raspberry Awards	Worst Supporting Actress	Drew Barrymore	Nominated	
March 23, 2002	Golden Raspberry Awards	Worst Supporting Actress	Julie Hagerty	Nominated	
March 23, 2002	Golden Raspberry Awards	Worst Screen Couple	Tom Green and any animal he abuses	Won	
March 23, 2002	Golden Raspberry Awards	Worst Director	Tom Green	Won	
March 23, 2002	Golden Raspberry Awards	Worst Screenplay	Tom Green and Derek Harvie	Won	
February 26, 2005	Golden Raspberry Awards	Worst "Comedy" of Our First 25 Years	Freddy Got Fingered (20th Century Fox)	Nominated	
March 6, 2010	Golden Raspberry Awards	Worst Picture of the Decade	Freddy Got Fingered (20th Century Fox)	Nominated	

== Legacy ==
=== Later reviews ===
Freddy Got Fingered began to see more praise over time, becoming a cult classic. Critic Nathan Rabin of The A.V. Club gave the film a rave review in his "My Year of Flops" column, comparing it to the work of Jean-Luc Godard and calling the film "less as a conventional comedy than as a borderline Dadaist provocation, a $15 million prank at the studio's expense" adding "it's utterly rare and wondrous to witness the emergence of a dazzlingly original comic voice. I experienced that glorious sensation watching Fingered...I can honestly say that I've never seen anything remotely like it" and rated it a "Secret Success." In a later column, Rabin stated "I was a little worried that I'd catch flak for giving mad props to a film as divisive and widely reviled as Freddy Got Fingered. So I was relieved to discover that every single comment agreed with my assessment of it... It also didn't escape my attention that my Freddy post was the most commented-upon post in the history of My Year of Flops by a huge margin." Comedian Chris Rock listed Freddy Got Fingered as one of his favorite movies on his website.

Later, in his review of the film Stealing Harvard, a film co-starring Green, Ebert wrote: "Seeing Tom Green reminded me, as how could it not, of his movie Freddy Got Fingered, which was so poorly received by the film critics that it received only one lonely, apologetic positive review on the Tomatometer. I gave it—let's see—zero stars. Bad movie, especially the scene where Green was whirling the newborn infant around his head by its umbilical cord. But the thing is, I remember Freddy Got Fingered more than a year later. I refer to it sometimes. It is a milestone. And for all its sins, it was at least an ambitious movie, a go-for-broke attempt to accomplish something. It failed, but it has not left me convinced that Tom Green doesn't have good work in him. Anyone with his nerve and total lack of taste is sooner or later going to make a movie worth seeing."

In an interview with Green on The Opie and Anthony Show, host Gregg "Opie" Hughes said the film had begun to be regarded as "one of the funniest movies ever made". Vadim Rizov for IFC.com wrote an article titled "In defense of Freddy Got Fingered". He calls the film one of the great underrated comedies of the decade and says the film would go on to do better if it was released today, comparing it to the successful Adult Swim series Aqua Teen Hunger Force.

=== Director's cut ===
Green stated that he would like to do a "director's cut" DVD release of the film in 2011 to celebrate the 10th anniversary. On March 9, 2010, on Loveline, Green announced that a director's cut would be released. In an answer to a question from a fan on his website tomgreen.com in December 2010, Green said that there was no progress yet in regards to the director's cut. In a Reddit "Ask Me Anything" (AMA) Green did on October 17, 2013, Green responded to a question regarding the release of the director's cut with: "The studio didn't give me the footage to make the directors cut. I want to do it. If you contact New Regency or 20th Century Fox and tell them you want a directors cut [sic] maybe it will happen!"

== See also ==
- List of comedy films of the 2000s
- List of 21st century films considered the worst
- List of films with live action and animation
