= 100 Years, 100 Stinkers: The Worst Films of the 20th Century =

List of worst films

100 Years, 100 Stinkers: The Worst Films of the 20th Century is a list of the 100 worst movies (in actuality 102, which lumped franchises into slots for a grand total of 133) of the 20th Century as determined by the Stinkers Bad Movie Awards.

== Background ==
Announced in 1998, it was conceived as a parody of AFI's 100 Years...100 Movies list of the best movies of the century. To determine the list, anyone who visited the Stinkers' website could suggest a worthy candidate; eventually, the 300 most popular choices were placed on a list for visitors to vote on followed by a ten-week period where votes for a ranked list of the 20 worst films were cast.

== Conclusion ==
The final results were revealed in 2001 as each entry was also given a descriptive paragraph in alphabetical order. Battlefield Earth topped the list of "dishonored" films beating out cult classics Plan 9 from Outer Space, Showgirls, Waterworld, and Howard the Duck.

== See also ==
- The Official Razzie Movie Guide
- The Golden Turkey Awards
- My Year of Flops
