= Kate Lanier =

Screenwriter

- Born: United States
- Occupation: Screenwriter

Kate Lanier is an American screenwriter best known for films such as CrazySexyCool: The TLC Story, What's Love Got to Do with It, Beauty Shop, Glitter, The Mod Squad and Set It Off.

== Filmography ==
Year	Film	Credit	Notes
1990	That Burning Question	Actor	Short
1993	What's Love Got to Do with It	Writer, Producer, Actor	Role: Stripper on Balcony
1994	Everybody Can Float	Writer, Director, Producer	Short
1996	Set It Off	Writer, Producer	Co-Wrote Screenplay with Takashi Bufford
1998	Dance with Me	Writer	Uncredited Revision
1999	The Mod Squad	Writer, Producer	Co-Wrote Screenplay with Stephen Kay and Scott Silver
2001	Glitter	Writer, Producer	
2003	Honey	Writer	Uncredited Revision
2005	Beauty Shop	Writer	Co-Wrote Screenplay with Norman Vance Jr.
2013	Something to Do	Writer, Director, Co-Producer	Short, Co-Wrote Screenplay with Brendan McIvor Fleming
2013	CrazySexyCool: The TLC Story	Writer, Executive Producer	
2017	Beaches	Writer	Co-Wrote Screenplay with Nikole Beckwith
