= Congressional Award =

Award given by U.S. representatives

The Congressional Award is a non-partisan, voluntary, non-competitive program established by the United States Congress in 1979 for young Americans 14 to 24 years of age. Participants set goals in four program areas: voluntary public service, personal development, physical fitness, and expedition/exploration and may earn bronze, silver, or gold Congressional Award certificates and medals.

== History ==
The award was created on November 16, 1979 through Congressional legislation. The original bill was sponsored by Senator Malcolm Wallop of Wyoming and Representative James J. Howard of New Jersey. The legislation has since been reauthorized several times, extending its termination date.

Congress created the Congressional Award Fellowship Trust in 1990 to "benefit the charitable and educational purposes of the Foundation." The Foundation withdrew $20,000 from the trust to support its 2007 operations.

The award is overseen by the Congressional Award Foundation which runs as a public–private partnership, and is registered as a 501(c) organization. It is funded by private sector donations and runs as an independent nonprofit organisation authorized by Congress.

=== Funding concerns ===
A Government Accountability Office (GAO) audit of the Foundation's 2005 and 2006 financial statements found two financial issues:

1. The foundation's continued financial sustainability was threatened by a decline in assets, with an organizational value under $8,500 as of September 30, 2006.
2. There was an inconsistency between functional expenses reported in the annual information return (Form 990) filed with the Internal Revenue Service (IRS) and the audited financial statements for the fiscal year 2005.

In a GAO audit published in May 2008, both matters were considered resolved.

Within a year of the 2006 audit, the foundation's funds had rebounded to $125,000. The GAO also noted that the Foundation's national director paid over $23,000 to cover the costs of the gold award ceremony during fiscal year 2006; she was reimbursed for all but $664 by December 2006. The inconsistency described in the second issue was resolved in the Form 990 and audited financial statements for fiscal year 2006.

The Congressional Award's financial reports show a period of stability following the 2006 audit, supported by ongoing fundraising efforts. According to the Congressional Budget Office's report on S. 1348, the Foundation received no federally-appropriated funds, but did receive free office space in a Congressional office building, and was not required to pay for the medals produced by the U.S. Mint.

== Program overview ==
Participants use a record book to track their progress in four program areas: Voluntary public service, personal development, physical fitness, and expedition or exploration.

== Congressional Award Foundation ==
=== Board of directors ===
The 48-member board of directors is partially appointed by the joint leadership of both parties in the House of Representatives and the Senate. In addition to actively promoting the Congressional Award Program across the country, the board meets quarterly to assess the program's growth and provide direction to the national staff.

==== Executive officers ====
- Chairman of the Board – Shawn Whitman, FMC Corporation
- Vice Chair – John Mason, Federal Government Affairs, Altria
- Secretary – Laura O'Connor*, Utah
- Treasurer – Edward Blansitt, III, MBA, CPA

National/appointed members denoted by asterisk (*)

=== Congressional Award national events ===
The Congressional Award is a 501(c)(3), non-profit organization that does not receive any funding from the federal government. Instead, they hold several fundraising events to support the program, most notably the Congressional Award Chiefs of Staff Annual Golf Classic and the Congressional Award Chiefs of Staff Charity Poker Event. The Congressional Awards' largest event is the annual gold medal ceremony, held in the US Capitol. The June ceremony is held for gold medalists to receive their awards from members of Congress. Due to the substantial number of medalists, there are usually two ceremonies on Capitol Hill on the gold medal day. The gold medal ceremony also recognizes adult volunteers who have supported participants throughout the program.
