= Glitter (film) =

2001 film by Vondie Curtis-Hall

- US theatrical release poster
- Directed by: Vondie Curtis-Hall
- Screenplay by: Jess Mariano
- Story by: Cheryl West
- Produced by: Laurence Mark
- Starring: Mariah Carey; Max Beesley; Terrence Howard
- Cinematography: Geoffrey Simpson
- Edited by: Jeff Freeman
- Music by: Mariah Carey; Terence Blanchard
- Production companies: 20th Century Fox; Columbia Pictures; Maroon Entertainment
- Distributed by: 20th Century Fox (United States and Canada); Columbia TriStar Film Distributors International (international)
- Release date: September 21, 2001
- Running time: 104 minutes
- Country: United States
- Language: English
- Budget: $22 million
- Box office: $5.2 million

Glitter is a 2001 American romantic musical drama film written by Kate Lanier and directed by Vondie Curtis-Hall. It stars Mariah Carey, Max Beesley, and Terrence Howard. Carey plays Billie Frank, an aspiring singer who, along with her friends Louise (rapper Da Brat) and Roxanne (Tia Texada), is a club dancer. Music producer Timothy Walker (Howard) offers them a contract as backup singers/dancers to another singer. At the premiere of the song they record, Billie meets Julian "Dice" Black (Beesley), a nightclub DJ who helps establish her solo career. In the process, Billie and Dice fall in love.

Carey began working on a film and soundtrack project titled All That Glitters in 1997, but it was put on hold in favor of other commitments with her record label. Following this, she aimed to complete the film and album project for the summer of 2001. Filming began in Toronto and New York City at the end of September 2000. Carey used the time to work on the soundtrack of the film, along with Eric Benét and Da Brat, who also appeared in the film. The release dates for the film and its accompanying soundtrack were delayed after Carey was suddenly hospitalized, citing "extreme exhaustion" and a "physical and emotional breakdown". The film was released on September 21, 2001, by 20th Century Fox in the United States and Canada and by Columbia Pictures through Columbia TriStar Film Distributors International in international markets, ten days after the release of the soundtrack on September 11, 2001.

Glitter was widely panned by critics and audiences and was a box-office bomb. Reviewers were highly disappointed with the film and Carey's performance, earning her a Golden Raspberry Award for Worst Actress. This also caused the film to receive negative commentary on social media sites, with Carey herself later admitting that she regretted being part of the film. Some went on to call it one of the worst films ever made. Glitter opened in 1,996 American theaters and grossed $2.5 million in its first week, with a worldwide total of $5.3 million against a $22 million budget. The soundtrack of the film achieved moderate commercial success and went on to sell over two million copies worldwide, considerably less than Carey's previous releases.

== Plot ==
In the 1970s, alcoholic nightclub singer Lillian Frank is fired after an unsuccessful attempt to rouse the crowd with her torch song, "Lillie's Blues", with her daughter Billie accompanying her on vocals. Defeated, Lillian lights a cigarette but accidentally falls asleep, starting a fire and causing the building to be evacuated. Due to her mother's actions, Billie is taken into foster care.

Years later, in 1983, the adult Billie is a club dancer along with her foster care friends Louise and Roxanne. They meet record producer Timothy Walker, who hires them as backup singers and dancers to famous singer Sylk. As Sylk's singing voice is subpar, Timothy opts to dub over her voice with Billie's voice. Later, at a nightclub hosted by Julian "Dice" Black, Sylk debuts "All My Life" and Dice realizes that the voice is Billie's. Impressed, he wishes to produce her, but Billie is concerned about her contract with Timothy. However, Dice gets Timothy to agree on the provision that Dice pays him $100,000.

Billie and Dice start working on songs, ultimately sign with a major record label, and start to fall in love; they go out for dinner on a celebratory date and have passionate sex in Dice's apartment. Billie's first major single, "Loverboy", is No.1 for 10 weeks, but friction arises between Billie and Dice when the record label insists that Billie embrace a sexier image and work with other songwriters and producers for her debut album. Billie performs at an awards ceremony, where she meets singer Rafael. Billie is threatened by Timothy regarding Dice's unpaid debt to him. Upset at Dice for lying about her contract, Billie leaves him and collaborates with several songwriters and producers, including Rafael, with whom she makes another No.1 single, "Want You". Her debut album becomes a massive success, and her upcoming concert at Madison Square Garden sells out quickly.

Billie begins writing a song on her own due to the emotional pain of losing her mother and Dice. Dice also misses Billie and begins writing a song as well. On the day of the concert, Billie goes to Dice's apartment to reconcile with him, only to find that he is not home. She discovers the music he has written, realizes they wrote the same song, "Never Too Far", and kisses his sheet music. Dice, upon seeing her lipstick prints on the sheet, plans a reconciliation but is shot dead by Timothy. Later that night, a devastated Billie sees the news report of Dice's death, and onstage afterward, commands the band to stop playing "Loverboy". She tearfully tells the audience not to take the ones they love for granted, and she then performs "Never Too Far" as a tribute to Dice. After the concert, Billie reads a note from Dice, where he tells her that he loves her and that he has found Lillian. Billie's limousine takes her to the secluded rural property where she is happily reunited with her mother.

== Cast ==
- Mariah Carey as Billie Frank
  - Isabel Gomes as young Billie
- Max Beesley as Julian "Dice" Black
- Terrence Howard as Timothy Walker
- Da Brat as Louise
  - Lindsey Pickering as young Louise
- Tia Texada as Roxanne
  - Courtnie Beceiro as young Roxanne
- Eric Benét as Rafael
- Valarie Pettiford as Lillian Frank
- Ann Magnuson as Kelly
- Dorian Harewood as Guy Richardson
- Grant Nickalls as Jack Bridges
- Padma Lakshmi as Sylk
- Kim Roberts as Miss Wilson
- Bill Sage as Billie's father

== Production ==
In late 1997, Carey began work on the project under the working title All That Glitters, but the project was put on hold due to Columbia Records' requests to release a compilation album to capitalize on the 1998 holiday season. #1's was released in November 1998. Despite this, Carey continued working on All That Glitters, but wished to fulfill her contract with Columbia Records, which had her signed for one more album. In 1999, she released her last album with Columbia Records, Rainbow, which included some of the material created for All That Glitters. On April 2, 2001, Carey released a joint statement alongside Columbia Records confirming her departure.

Following this departure, Carey signed a US$100 million record deal with Virgin Records (EMI Records) in April 2001. The record label gave Carey full conceptual and creative control over the project. It was announced that All That Glitters would take place in 1983, with the sound of its soundtrack following the theme through a modernized version of the 1980s sound. Carey developed the film's concept to be about a club dancer who becomes a successful singer and wrote the screenplay alongside Kate Lanier, who expanded Carey's original concept. On her character, Carey stated,

We start the movie and we see little Billie and her mom singing, and we realize there's a dysfunction going on and her mom's unstable. She gets taken away from her mother and ends up in a foster home. Then, we meet her two friends, Louise and Roxanne, who are played by Da Brat and Tia Texada. They're her extended family. It's Billie's journey to understand why she feels abandoned by her mother. ... That's what drives her to want to sing. She connects with this [DJ] character. His name is Dice. He's sort of like what the mother is in terms of semi-dysfunctional.

Principal photography for All That Glitters began in New York City and Toronto in August 2000 and was expected to wrap up in late September with a planned release in March 2001. Later that month, Eric Benét was cast as a character named Caesar after filming had already begun. The original screenplay, which was already finished, was rewritten several times on set during production and was often abandoned completely in favor of improvisation. Production experienced several delays and the release was pushed back many times. In early April 2001, the film and soundtrack were still titled All That Glitters. By May of that year, All That Glitters was renamed Glitter for the scheduled August 31, 2001, release.

== Release and promotion ==
Following the commencement of Glitter and the release of the soundtrack's lead single "Loverboy", Carey embarked on a short promotional campaign for the song and its parent album. However, during the campaign, Carey exhibited what was reported as "erratic behavior". On July 17, 2001, Carey was interviewed on the program 106 & Park on the BET network. During the interview, Carey hid her thighs behind large pillows and ranted that her life was "one day that was continuous". Two days later, on July 19, Carey made a surprise appearance on the MTV program TRL. She came out onto the filming stage pushing an ice cream cart while wearing an oversized shirt. Seemingly anxious and exhilarated, Carey began giving out individual bars of ice cream to fans and guests on the program while waving to the crowd down below in Times Square, while diverging into a rambling monologue regarding therapy. Carey then walked to host Carson Daly's platform and began a striptease, in which she shed her shirt to reveal a tight yellow-and-green ensemble, leading him to exclaim "Mariah Carey has lost her mind!"

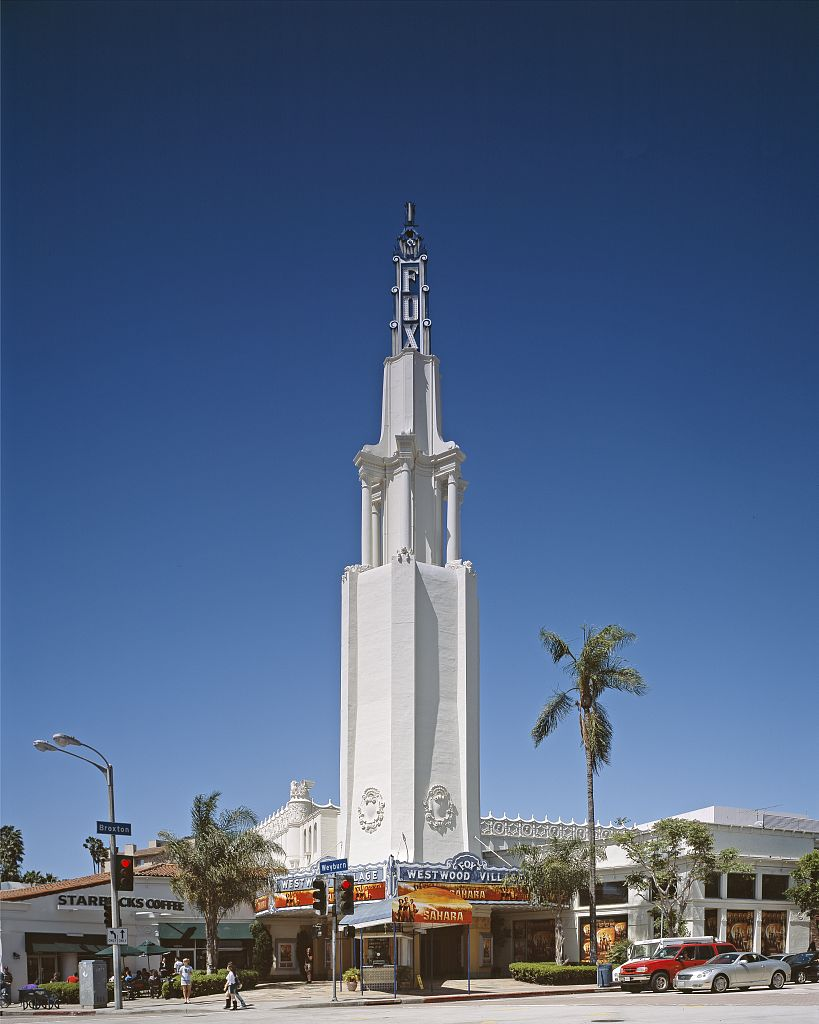
Carey promoted the film by making a public appearance during its opening day at the Fox Theater, Westwood Village

The next day, on July 20, Carey held a record signing for the soundtrack's lead single "Loverboy" at the Roosevelt Field shopping mall on Long Island before fans and the media. As a camera crew covered the event, she began rambling on several subjects before finally discussing radio host Howard Stern and how his form of humor on his program bothered her greatly. At that point, Carey's publicist Cindi Berger grabbed the microphone from her hand and asked the news crew to stop filming. Within a few days, Carey posted erratic voice messages on her website, which were soon taken down. On July 26, she was hospitalized, citing "extreme exhaustion" and a "physical and emotional breakdown". Following her admission to an undisclosed hospital in Connecticut, Carey remained hospitalized and under a doctor's care for two weeks, followed by an extended absence from the public. During her hospitalization, Carey was diagnosed with bipolar disorder.

Following Carey's publicized breakdown and hospitalization, Virgin Records and 20th Century Fox delayed the release of both Glitter and its soundtrack. The announcement was made on August 9, 2001, that both the soundtrack and the film would be postponed three weeks, respectively from August 21 to September 11, and from August 31 to September 21. When asked regarding the motives behind the delay, Nancy Berry, vice chairman of Virgin Music Group Worldwide, addressed Carey's personal and physical condition:

Mariah is looking forward to being able to participate in both her album and movie projects and we are hopeful that this new soundtrack release date will allow her to do so. She has been making great recovery progress, and continues to grow stronger every day. Virgin Music Worldwide continues to give its absolute commitment and support to Mariah on every level.

Carey's first public appearance to promote the film itself was on its opening day at the Fox Theater, Westwood Village in jeans and a black tank top adorned with an American flag, paying homage to victims of the September 11 attacks. After giving interviews and signing autographs, Carey sat in the center section of the theater flanked by security guards and handlers, along with audience members who had won tickets through the Los Angeles radio station Power 106. During her appearance, Carey said she hoped that Glitter would provide moviegoers an emotional escape during the attacks' aftermath in the country. "But obviously nothing can overshadow the events that have gone on, and I need to stay focused on that," she completed.

Fashions in the film were highlighted by costume designer Joseph G. Aulisi. Showcased was clothing by Soo Luen Tom, Luis Sequeira, Richard Saenz, Renee Fontana, and Michael Warbrock. On November 21, 2001, the film was released in the Philippines simultaneously with Harry Potter and the Philosopher's Stone. In Germany, the film was released under the title Glitter – Shine of a Star.

=== Home media ===
The film was released on VHS and DVD on January 15, 2002, by Columbia TriStar Home Entertainment. A Blu-ray version of the film was released on January 3, 2017, by Mill Creek Entertainment, under license from Sony and Fox.

== Reception ==
=== Box office ===
Glitter was released in the United States on September 21, 2001. On its opening day, the film grossed an estimated $786,436 in 1,202 theaters. On the first weekend of its release, Glitter was the eleventh-highest-grossing film, grossing an estimated $2,414,596. By the second week, ticket sales for the film dropped 61.1%, ranking at number 15 at the box office. It was originally scheduled to open over Labor Day weekend, but the film was pushed back three weeks when Carey was admitted to a hospital for what she stated was extreme exhaustion. Glitter was a commercial failure, grossing a total of $4,274,407 in the United States against a $22 million budget. Worldwide, the film grossed a total of $5,271,666 by its closing day on October 18, 2001.

In an interview in 2010, Carey stated that she believed the film's failure at the box office was largely due to the soundtrack's release date being September 11, 2001, the same day as the terrorist attacks on the World Trade Center and The Pentagon. She said, "Here's the thing that a lot of people don't know, that movie was released on September 11, 2001 – could there be a worse day for that movie to come out? ... I don't even know that many people even saw the movie."

=== Critical response ===
On the review aggregator website Rotten Tomatoes, 6% of 86 critics' reviews are positive. The website's consensus reads: "Glitter is a hodgepodge of movie cliches and bad acting that's sure to generate unintentional laughs. Unfortunately, the movie is not bad enough to be good." Metacritic, which uses a weighted average, assigned the film a score of 14 out of 100, based on 23 critics, indicating "overwhelming dislike". Audiences polled by CinemaScore gave the film an average grade of "B-" on an A+ to F scale. Criticism focused on Carey's acting and the script's use of clichés. Upon release, it was widely deemed one of the worst films ever made.

The Village Voice proclaimed, "For her part, Carey seems most concerned about keeping her lips tightly sealed like a kid with braces, and when she tries for an emotion—any emotion—she looks as if she's lost her car keys." Peter Bradshaw joked that she "is comfortably out-acted by the cherrywood kitchen counter-top in her spiffy Manhattan apartment". Roger Ebert spoke relatively well of Carey's individual performance, writing that it "ranges from dutiful flirtatiousness to intense sincerity ..." However, he ended with, "and above all, the film is lacking in joy. It never seems like it's fun to be Billie Frank." Bruce Feld of Film Journal International also appreciated how the film highlighted Carey's greatest talents: "Her beauty and extraordinary voice are always shown to advantage, and there are few pleasures in contemporary music as thrilling as hearing Carey soar to a high note and hang there like a trapeze artist who refuses to fall."

Intended as a vehicle to break Mariah Carey as a movie star, it instead became a year-long punch line. Carey might have a five-octave voice, but her performance as a burgeoning singer was strictly one-note and garnered her a Razzie for worst actress. Trotting out every hoary cliché about the music business imaginable, Glitter isn't just one of the worst music-themed films ever made — it's one of the worst films ever made, period.

— Movie magazine Fade In, talking about Glitter on their list "The 30 worst Vanity Projects of all time".

Lawrence Van Gelder of The New York Times said, "Glitter is mostly dross, an unintentionally hilarious compendium of time-tested cinematic clichés that illustrate the chasm between hopeful imitation and successful duplication." Total Film magazine reviewed the film extremely negatively, awarding it just one star and stating, "It can't even scale heights of campy awfulness. This isn't so bad it's good, it's so bad it's actionable ... An inept star vehicle that starts out desperately tedious and gets less interesting. Leaves you wishing the Lumiére brothers had said bollocks to cinema and gone down the pub." The film is listed in Golden Raspberry Award founder John Wilson's book The Official Razzie Movie Guide as one of the 100 Most Enjoyably Bad Movies Ever Made.

=== Retrospective analysis ===
Twenty years after the release of the film, Mic writer Treye Green noted in an analysis that upon release, many people used the film to "defame and demean the pop music superstar", but he ultimately praised the theme of the film, which is to "put yourself first and never abandon your dreams — a theme Carey lived out in real life as she boldly navigated harsh critiques and continued to push through". He went on to say,

The ebullience of Glitter was dimmed by a ravenous means to diminish the joy of the project and revel in the perceived leveling of Carey's illustrious career. But after 20 years, the project is beginning to get the credit it deserves. The film is being elevated to a cult classic.

Green also called the film a "beloved symbol of the tenacity, resilience, and innovativeness Carey has shown throughout her legendary career". Medium writer Richard LeBeau also commented on the film, saying that the film was not "deserving of its designation as one of the worst films ever made". He stated that "Lanier's screenplay is painfully cliched at times" and that the director, Curtis Hall, made "some cringe-worthy choices after a strong opening segment". He added that the "vitriol spewed at [Carey] during this period of time wreaked of misogyny, racism, and mental health stigma and completely overlooked the role of national tragedy, corporate sabotage, and her personal struggles".

Almost two decades after its release, Glitter began to attract wide reappraisal and praise from mainstream critics and has developed a cult following. Kara Brown of Jezebel praised Glitter and cited: "Mariah was ahead of us all and the time is now". Mike Waas of Idolator commented that Glitter was "a misunderstood [record]" and called it "the biggest pop music injustices of the 21st century". Daniel Welsh of MSN gave the album positive feedback and felt that "the brilliance of Glitter has gone unappreciated for too long". In a later article for Complex, Michael Arceneaux described the album as "the perfect '80s tribute". In a Vulture article, Dee Lockett described the record as "undeniably ahead of its time even despite it being an homage to disco."

=== Cast response ===
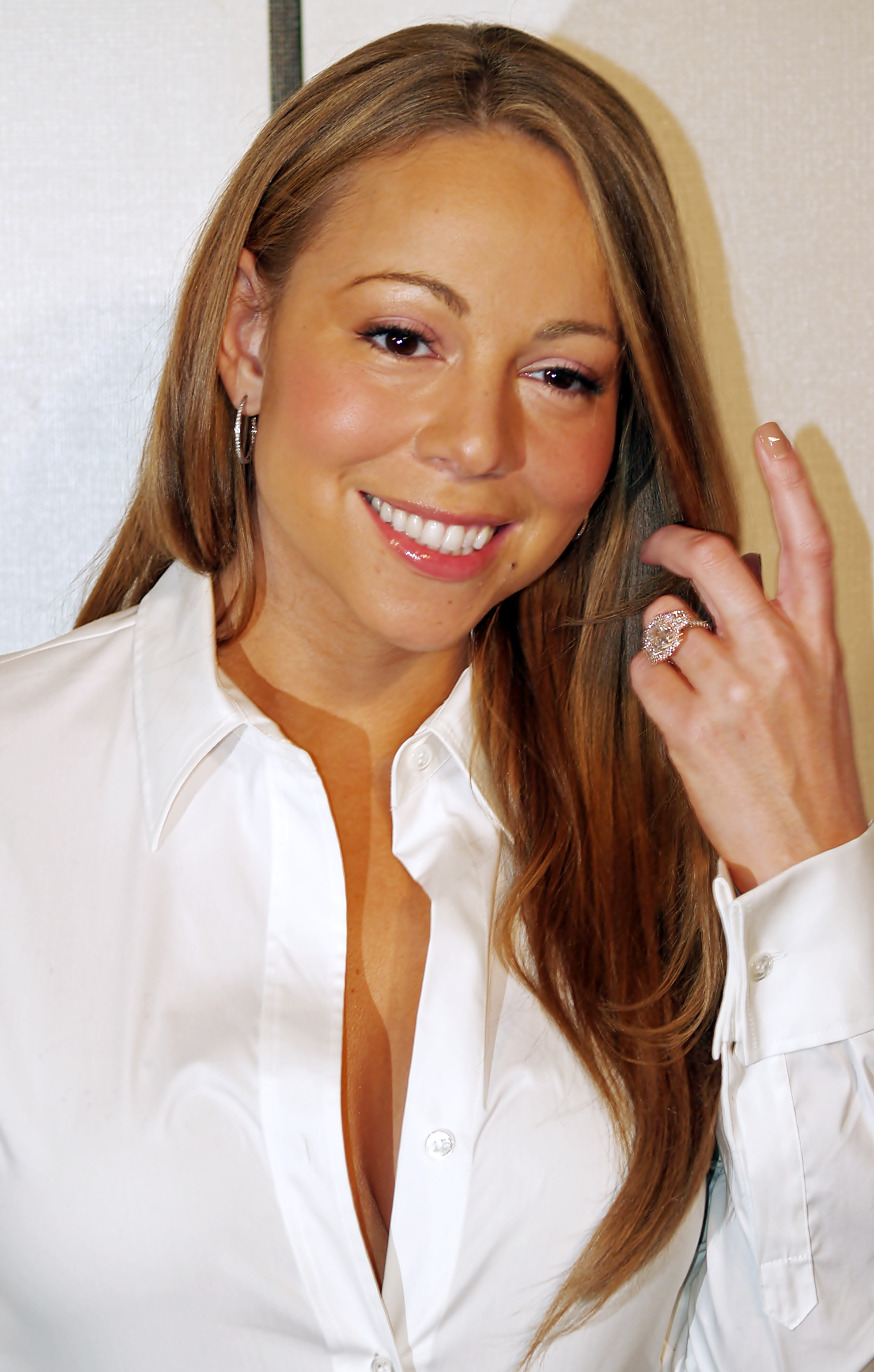
American singer Mariah Carey (pictured) received generally negative reviews for her role; Carey distanced herself from the film thereafter

Carey herself has also openly dismissed and distanced herself from the film; she stated in 2002 that "[the film] started out as a concept with substance, but it ended up being geared to 10-year-olds. It lost a lot of grit. It was gritless, in fact. I kind of got in over my head." In the years after the film's release, she has often stated that she regrets doing it. In December 2013, during an appearance on Watch What Happens Live with Andy Cohen, Carey said she considered Glitter the biggest regret of her career, calling it a "kitsch moment in history ... in the history of my life". She stated that the film wreaked havoc on her career; "It was a horrible couple of years (after the film's release) and then I had to get my momentum back for people to let it go"; she further added that she would not let anyone around her mention the film in conversation and that it was known as "the G word". For two decades, Carey refused to perform any song from the film's soundtrack in her concerts. In 2020, Carey released her memoir, The Meaning of Mariah Carey, which highlighted her experiences throughout the release of the film. She called it "a collision of bad luck, bad timing, and sabotage".

Da Brat also claimed the film was a "major commercial failure and critical flop". In 2019, Brat filed for bankruptcy after owing rapper Shayla Stevens $8 million. After being "subjected to physical threats, stalking and harassment", Brat denied earning any money from her social media and from her acting role in Glitter, and stated that she was only paid the minimum-wage SAG-AFTRA Scale rate during each day of the film's production. In 2015, Brat stated in a Billboard interview that she was proud of how she and Carey "made history on some of those songs. She's sold millions of records, and I was very happy to be a part of [it]".

Max Beesley also commented on the film's reception, stating that it "was a disaster". He went on to say in an interview with The Guardian that in the film, there was originally "some heavy-duty drama [...] and Mariah really showed her acting boots" but "they just cut all that out and [he] nearly cried when [he] saw it". He went on to defend the film by saying, "It was released on September 12, the day after the atrocities, so it was dead". Tia Texada, who played Roxanne, also spoke on the film with Chaunce Hayden of Steppin Out in 2003, stating that the film "was a disaster from the time [she] got there". She went on to speak ill of Carey, saying that "working with [her] was really hard". Conversely, Terrence Howard praised Carey and Beesley's performances, noting his "emotional experiences" with Beesley, calling him angelic and talented. He also added that the "experience and getting to know Mariah" was better than "the product".

=== Accolades ===
Group	Category	Recipient	Result	Ref(s).
Golden Raspberry Awards (2002)	Worst Director	Vondie Curtis Hall	Nominated	
Golden Raspberry Awards (2002)	Worst Actress	Mariah Carey	Won	
Golden Raspberry Awards (2002)	Worst Supporting Actor	Max Beesley	Nominated	
Golden Raspberry Awards (2002)	Worst Picture	20th Century Fox, Columbia Pictures	Nominated	
Golden Raspberry Awards (2002)	Worst Screen Couple	Mariah Carey's cleavage	Nominated	
Golden Raspberry Awards (2002)	Worst Screenplay	Kate Lanier, Cheryl L. West	Nominated	
Golden Raspberry Awards (2004)	Worst "Musical" of Our First 25 Years		Nominated	
Stinkers Bad Movie Awards	Worst Picture	20th Century Fox, Columbia Pictures	Nominated	
Stinkers Bad Movie Awards	Worst Actress	Mariah Carey	Won	
Stinkers Bad Movie Awards	Worst Song	"Loverboy"	Won	
Stinkers Bad Movie Awards	Worst On-Screen Couple	Mariah Carey and Max Beesley	Nominated	

== Soundtrack ==
The accompanying soundtrack, Glitter, became Carey's lowest showing on the charts. The first single, "Loverboy", peaked at number two on the US Billboard Hot 100 chart, but only after Virgin Records spurred sales of the single by dropping the price down to 99 cents. "Never Too Far", the album's second release, was released on October 23, 2001. It failed to impact the main Billboard chart and achieved weak international charting. Carey was unable to film a music video for the single, as she was still recovering from her breakdown. Instead, a video was created using a scene taken directly from the film, where Billie Frank (played by Carey) sings the song at Madison Square Garden during her first sold-out concert. Frank's performance of the song in the film omits its entire second verse, and the song's development runs in parallel with the film's love story.

The album's third single, "Don't Stop (Funkin' 4 Jamaica)", released on December 10, 2001, mirrored the same weak charting as "Never Too Far", although receiving more rotation on MTV due to its music video. Directed by Sanaa Hamri, it features the theme of Southern bayous and lifestyles, and presents Carey and Mystikal in "Southern style" clothing and hairstyles. Some shots feature three versions of Carey singing into a microphone on the screen at one time. The final single released from Glitter was "Reflections (Care Enough)", which received a limited release in Japan on December 15, 2001. Following its limited promotional push from Virgin and the absence of a music video, the song failed to make much of an impact. The album itself initially struggled to reach gold certification, but since its 2001 release has been certified platinum. Virgin Records dropped Carey from the label due to the poor sales of the album and bought her out of their $100 million contract with her for $20 million.

=== 2018 resurgence ===
In 2018, almost two decades after the release of the soundtrack for Glitter, a social media campaign called #JusticeForGlitter helped the soundtrack album soar to number one on the iTunes charts in multiple countries. The soundtrack album also re-entered Billboard's Soundtracks chart at number 14 and topped the R&B/Hip-Hop Catalog Albums chart. Carey later added songs from the album in a medley as part of her Caution World Tour in 2019.

== See also ==
- List of 21st century films considered the worst

== Works cited ==
- Shapiro, Marc (2001). Mariah Carey. ECW Press. ISBN 978-1-55022-444-3. Archived from the original on January 19, 2023.
