= List of accolades received by Precious =

List of awards won by Precious
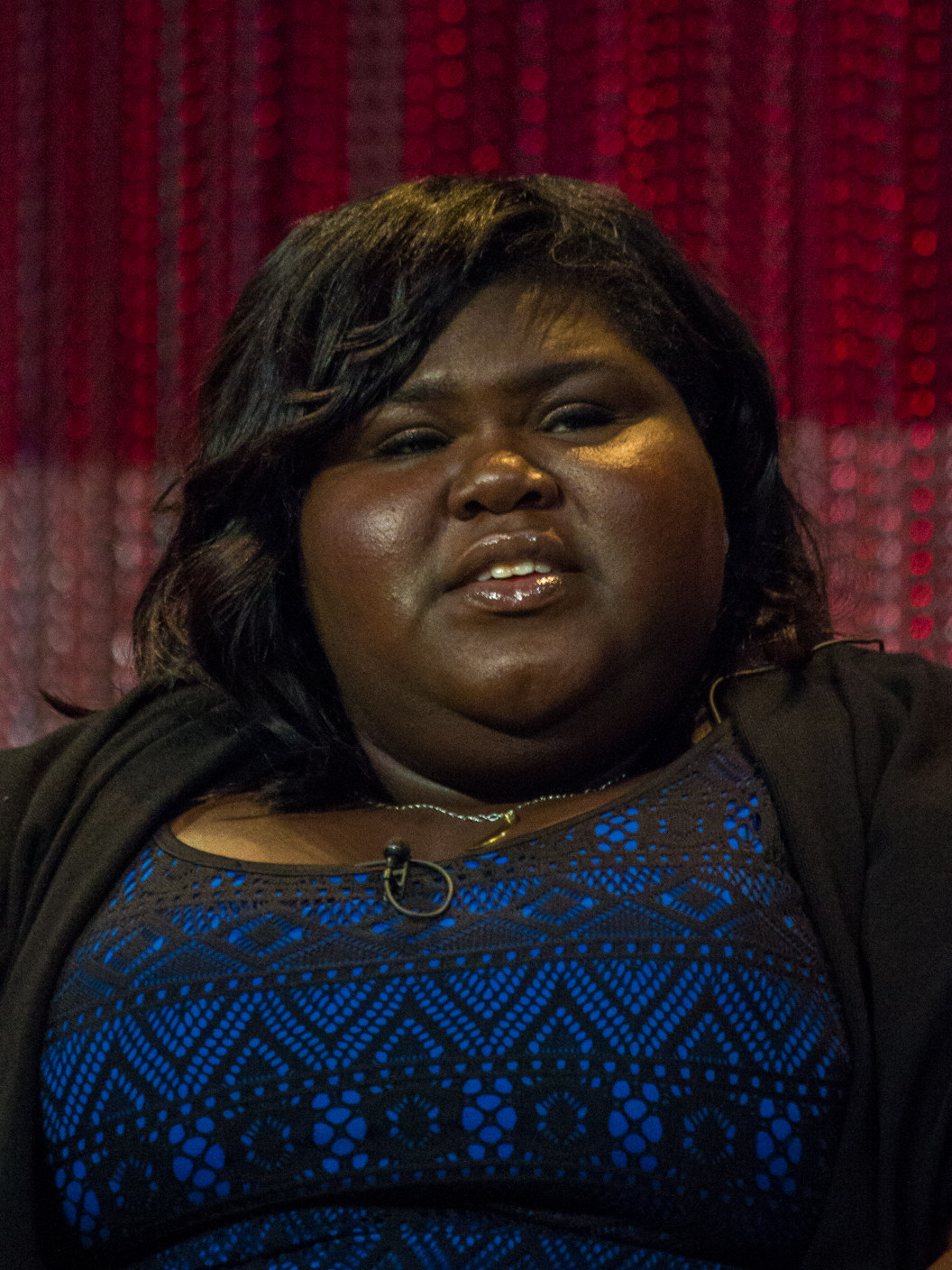
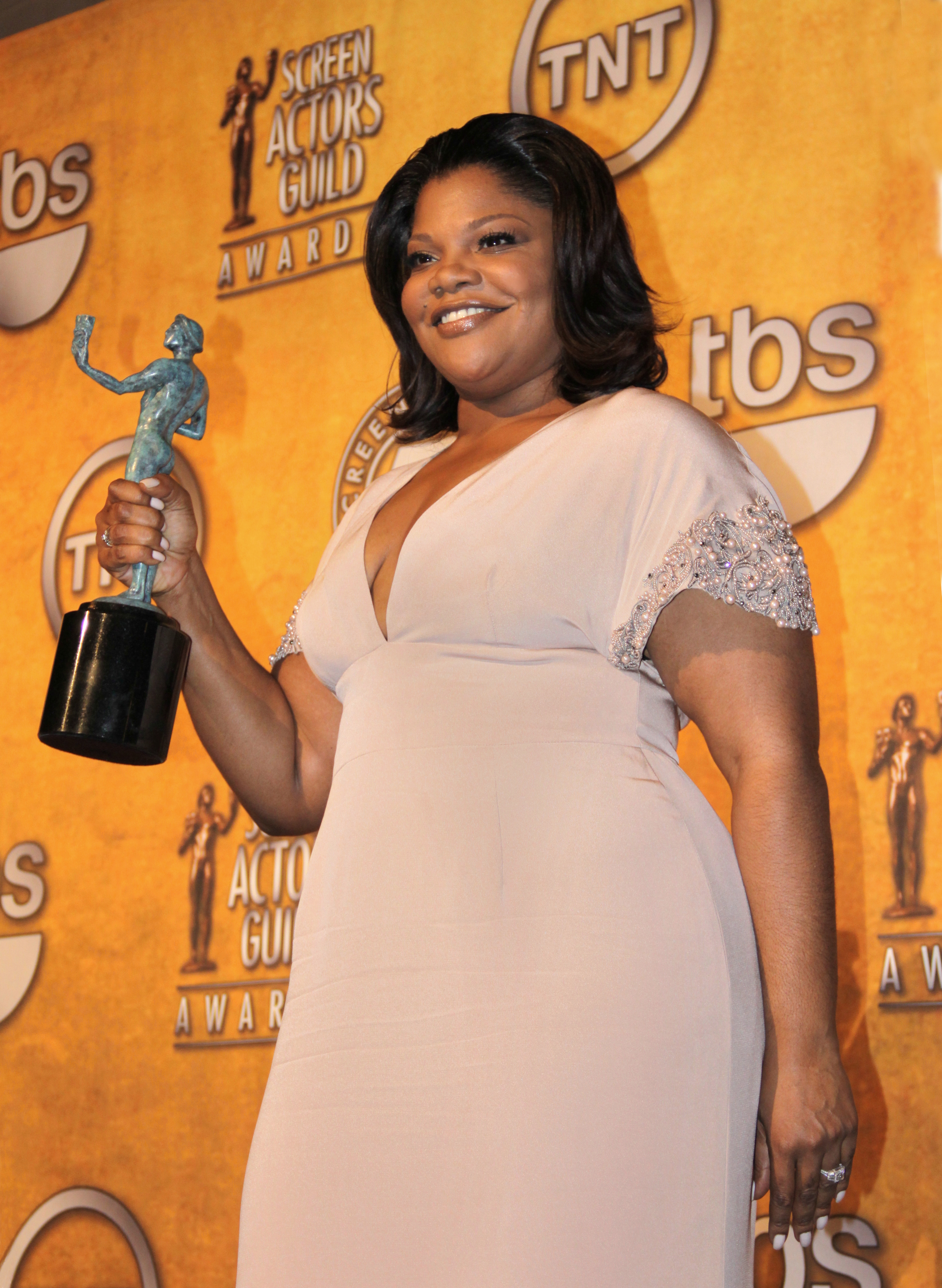
- Gabourey Sidibe and Mo'Nique received several accolades for their performance, with the latter sweeping the award season.
Awards and nominations
Award	Won	Nominated
Academy Awards	2	6
British Academy of Film and Television Arts	1	3
Chicago Film Critics Association	1	2
Golden Globe Awards	1	2
Los Angeles Film Critics	1	0
National Board of Review	1	0
New York Film Critics	2	0
Online Film Critics Society	1	1
Producers Guild of America	1	1
San Diego Film Critics Society	0	1
Satellite Awards	4	3
Toronto Film Critics Association	0	1
- Total number of wins and nominations
Totals	75	135
- Footnotes

Precious: Based on the Novel "Push" by Sapphire (usually shortened to Precious) is an American drama film directed by Lee Daniels that was released in 2009. Precious is an adaptation by Geoffrey S. Fletcher of the 1996 novel Push by Sapphire. The film was released by Lions Gate Entertainment on November 6, 2009, in the United States and Canada, grossing over $1.8 million in its opening weekend in limited release, ranking 12th place at the box office. The film grossed over $47,500,000 domestically and $53,400,000 worldwide. Precious was well received by movie critics, with an approval rating of 91% on the review aggregator Rotten Tomatoes, which consists of popular and notable critics reviews from newspapers, websites, television and radio programs.

The film has received various awards and nominations, with the nominations categories mainly ranging from recognition of the film itself (Best Film) to its direction, editing and writing (Best Direction, Best Editing, Best Adapted Screenplay) to the cast's acting performance, mainly Mo'Nique's and Gabourey Sidibe's for Best Supporting Actress and Best Actress, respectively. Precious received three nominations at the 67th Golden Globe Awards ceremony, and received one award for Best Performance By An Actress In A Supporting Role In A Motion Picture. Precious received six nominations from the 82nd Academy Awards ceremony, winning two for Best Supporting Actress and Best Adapted Screenplay. The film also received four nominations at the 63rd British Academy Film Awards, winning Best Supporting Actress. The film won all five of its nominations at the 25th Independent Spirit Awards, for Best Feature, Best First Screenplay, Best Director, Best Female Lead and Best Supporting Female.

Precious received three nominations at the 16th Screen Actors Guild Awards, winning Outstanding Performance by a Female Actor in a Supporting Role. The film won the People's Choice Award, at the 34th Toronto International Film Festival, and Breakthrough Performance by an Actress, at the 81st National Board of Review Awards. The film also won the Special Jury Prize, at the 25th Sundance Film Festival. Precious received two nominations, winning the Stanley Kramer Award, at the 21st Producers Guild of America Awards and won Outstanding Directorial Achievement, 62nd Directors Guild of America Awards. Mo'Nique also received recognition for her performance at 35th LA Film Critics Association Awards, 75th NY Film Critics Circle Awards and 5th Utah Film Critics Association Awards, winning Best Supporting Actress from all three of the organizations. Precious was included in the Top 10 Films of 2009 lists from 18th Southeastern Film Critics Association Awards, 9th NY Film Critics Online, and 16th DFW Film Critics Association.

== Awards and nominations ==
Award	Date of ceremony	Category	Recipients and nominees	Result
Academy Awards	March 7, 2010	Best Picture	Lee Daniels, Sarah Siegel-Magness and Gary Magness	Nominated
Academy Awards	March 7, 2010	Best Director	Lee Daniels	Nominated
Academy Awards	March 7, 2010	Best Actress	Gabourey Sidibe	Nominated
Academy Awards	March 7, 2010	Best Supporting Actress	Mo'Nique	Won
Academy Awards	March 7, 2010	Best Adapted Screenplay	Geoffrey Fletcher	Won
Academy Awards	March 7, 2010	Best Film Editing	Joe Klotz	Nominated
African-American Film Critics Association	December 14, 2009	Best Picture	Precious	Won
African-American Film Critics Association	December 14, 2009	Best Supporting Actress	Mo'Nique	Won
African-American Film Critics Association	December 14, 2009	Best Director	Lee Daniels	Won
African-American Film Critics Association	December 14, 2009	Best Screenplay	Geoffrey Fletcher - Tied with John Musker, Ron Clements, and Rob Edwards for The Princess and the Frog	Won
African-American Film Critics Association	December 14, 2009	Best Actress	Gabourey Sidibe	Nominated
Alliance of Women Film Journalists Award	December 15, 2009	Unforgettable Moment Award	Precious	Won
Alliance of Women Film Journalists Award	December 15, 2009	Best Actress in Supporting Role	Mo'Nique	Won
Alliance of Women Film Journalists Award	December 15, 2009	Bravest Performance Award	Mo'Nique	Won
Alliance of Women Film Journalists Award	December 15, 2009	Best Film	Precious	Nominated
Alliance of Women Film Journalists Award	December 15, 2009	Best Screenplay, Adapted	Geoffrey Fletcher	Nominated
Alliance of Women Film Journalists Award	December 15, 2009	Best Actress	Gabourey Sidibe	Nominated
Alliance of Women Film Journalists Award	December 15, 2009	Best Breakthrough Performance	Gabourey Sidibe	Nominated
Alliance of Women Film Journalists Award	December 15, 2009	Bravest Performance Award	Gabourey Sidibe	Nominated
Alliance of Women Film Journalists Award	December 15, 2009	Best Ensemble Cast	Precious	Nominated
Alliance of Women Film Journalists Award	December 15, 2009	Movie You Wanted To Love But Just Couldn't	Precious	Nominated
American Film Institute Awards	December 13, 2009	10 Best Films	Precious	Won
ASPEN Film Festival	September 30 – October 4, 2009	Audience Award	Precious	Won
ASPEN Film Festival	September 30 – October 4, 2009	Artist To Watch Award	Paula Patton	Won
Black Reel Awards	February 13, 2010	Best Film	Precious	Won
Black Reel Awards	February 13, 2010	Best Actress	Gabourey Sidibe	Won
Black Reel Awards	February 13, 2010	Best Breakthrough Performance	Gabourey Sidibe	Won
Black Reel Awards	February 13, 2010	Best Supporting Actress	Mo'Nique	Won
Black Reel Awards	February 13, 2010	Best Supporting Actress	Mariah Carey	Nominated
Black Reel Awards	February 13, 2010	Best Supporting Actress	Paula Patton	Nominated
Black Reel Awards	February 13, 2010	Best Director	Lee Daniels	Won
Black Reel Awards	February 13, 2010	Best Screenplay, Adapted or Original	Geoffrey Fletcher	Won
Black Reel Awards	February 13, 2010	Best Ensemble	Precious	Won
Black Reel Awards	February 13, 2010	Best Supporting Actor	Lenny Kravitz	Nominated
Boston Society of Film Critics Awards	February 9, 2010	Best Supporting Actress	Mo'Nique	Won
Boston Society of Film Critics Awards	February 9, 2010	Best Cast	Precious	Won
British Academy Film Awards	February 21, 2010	Best Film	Lee Daniels, Sarah Siegel-Magness and Gary Magness	Nominated
British Academy Film Awards	February 21, 2010	Best Actress	Gabourey Sidibe	Nominated
British Academy Film Awards	February 21, 2010	Best Supporting Actress	Mo'Nique	Won
British Academy Film Awards	February 21, 2010	Best Adapted Screenplay	Geoffrey Fletcher	Nominated
Capri Hollywood International Film Festival	January 2, 2010	Supporting Actress of the Year	Mariah Carey	Won
Chicago Film Critics Association	December 21, 2009	Best Supporting Actress	Mo'Nique	Won
Chicago Film Critics Association	December 21, 2009	Best Actress	Gabourey Sidibe	Nominated
Chicago Film Critics Association	December 21, 2009	Most Promising Performer	Gabourey Sidibe	Nominated
Chicago International Film Festival	October 22, 2009	Precious	Audience Choice Award	Won
Critics' Choice Awards	January 15, 2010	Best Picture	Precious	Nominated
Critics' Choice Awards	January 15, 2010	Best Actress	Gabourey Sidibe	Nominated
Critics' Choice Awards	January 15, 2010	Best Directing	Lee Daniels	Nominated
Critics' Choice Awards	January 15, 2010	Best Adapted Screenplay	Geoffrey Fletcher	Nominated
Critics' Choice Awards	January 15, 2010	Best Supporting Actress	Mo'Nique	Won
Dallas-Fort Worth Film Critics Association	December 16, 2009	Top 10 Films	Precious	Won
Dallas-Fort Worth Film Critics Association	December 16, 2009	Best Supporting Actress	Mo'Nique	Won
Dallas-Fort Worth Film Critics Association	December 16, 2009	Russell Smith Award	Lee Daniels	Won
Deauville American Film Festival	September 13, 2009	Jury Prize	Precious	Won
Detroit Film Critics Society Awards	December 18, 2009	Best Actress	Gabourey Sidibe	Won
Detroit Film Critics Society Awards	December 18, 2009	Best Breakthrough Performance	Gabourey Sidibe	Won
Detroit Film Critics Society Awards	December 18, 2009	Best Supporting Actress	Mo'Nique	Won
Detroit Film Critics Society Awards	December 18, 2009	Best Ensemble	Precious	Nominated
Directors Guild of America Awards	January 30, 2010	Outstanding Directorial Achievement	Lee Daniels	Nominated
Florida Film Critics Circle Awards	December 21, 2009	Best Actress	Gabourey Sidibe	Won
Florida Film Critics Circle Awards	December 21, 2009	Pauline Kael Breakout Award	Gabourey Sidibe	Won
Florida Film Critics Circle Awards	December 21, 2009	Best Supporting Actress	Mo'Nique	Won
GLAAD Media Awards	April 17, 2010	Outstanding Film – Wide Release	Precious	Nominated
Golden Globe Awards	January 17, 2010	Best Motion Picture – Drama	Precious	Nominated
Golden Globe Awards	January 17, 2010	Best Performance By An Actress In A Motion Picture – Drama	Gabourey Sidbie	Nominated
Golden Globe Awards	January 17, 2010	Best Performance By An Actress In A Supporting Role In A Motion Picture	Mo'Nique	Won
Heartland Film Festival	October 29, 2009	Truly Moving Picture	Precious	Won
Houston Film Critics Society Awards	December 19, 2009	Best Picture	Precious	Nominated
Houston Film Critics Society Awards	December 19, 2009	Best Director	Lee Daniels	Nominated
Houston Film Critics Society Awards	December 19, 2009	Best Performance by an Actress in a Supporting Role	Mo'Nique	Nominated
Houston Film Critics Society Awards	December 19, 2009	Best Performance by an Actress in a Leading Role	Gabourey Sidibe	Nominated
Houston Film Critics Society Awards	December 19, 2009	Best Screenplay	Geoffrey Fletcher	Nominated
Independent Spirit Awards	March 5, 2010	Best Feature	Precious	Won
Independent Spirit Awards	March 5, 2010	Best Director	Lee Daniels	Won
Independent Spirit Awards	March 5, 2010	Best Female Lead	Gabourey Sidibe	Won
Independent Spirit Awards	March 5, 2010	Best Supporting Female	Mo'Nique	Won
Independent Spirit Awards	March 5, 2010	Best First Screenplay	Geoffrey Fletcher	Won
Iowa Film Critics Awards	January 14, 2010	Best Actress	Gabourey Sidibe	Won
Iowa Film Critics Awards	January 14, 2010	Best Supporting Actress	Mo'Nique	Won
Kansas City Film Critics Circle	January 3, 2010	Best Supporting Actress	Mo'Nique	Won
London Film Critics' Circle	February 18, 2010	Actress of the Year	Mo'Nique	Won
Los Angeles Film Critics Association Awards	December 14, 2009	Best Supporting Actress	Mo'Nique	Won
MTV Movie Awards	June 6, 2010	Best Breakout Star	Gabourey Sidibe	Nominated
NAACP Image Awards	February 26, 2010	Outstanding Motion Picture	Precious	Won
NAACP Image Awards	February 26, 2010	Outstanding Independent Motion Picture	Precious	Won
NAACP Image Awards	February 26, 2010	Outstanding Actress in a Motion Picture	Gabourey Sidibe	Won
NAACP Image Awards	February 26, 2010	Outstanding Supporting Actress in a Motion Picture	Mo'Nique	Won
NAACP Image Awards	February 26, 2010	Outstanding Writing in a Motion Picture	Geoffrey Fletcher	Won
NAACP Image Awards	February 26, 2010	Outstanding Directing in a Motion Picture (Theatrical or Television)	Lee Daniels	Won
NAACP Image Awards	February 26, 2010	Outstanding Supporting Actress in a Motion Picture	Mariah Carey	Nominated
NAACP Image Awards	February 26, 2010	Outstanding Supporting Actress in a Motion Picture	Paula Patton	Nominated
NAACP Image Awards	February 26, 2010	Outstanding Supporting Actor in a Motion Picture	Lenny Kravitz	Nominated
National Board of Review Awards	January 12, 2010	Breakthrough Performance	Gabourey Sidibe	Won
New York Film Critics Circle Awards	December 14, 2009	Best Supporting Actress	Mo'Nique	Won
New York Film Critics Online	December 13, 2009	Best Supporting Female	Mo'Nique	Won
New York Film Critics Online	December 13, 2009	Top 10 Films	Precious	Won
Online Film Critics Society Awards	January 5, 2010	Best Supporting Actress	Mo'Nique	Won
Online Film Critics Society Awards	January 5, 2010	Best Actress	Gabourey Sidibe	Nominated
Palm Springs International Film Festival	January 5, 2010	Breakthrough Performance Award	Mariah Carey	Won
Producers Guild of America Awards	January 24, 2010	Theatrical Picture	Precious	Nominated
Producers Guild of America Awards	January 24, 2010	Stanley Kramer Award	Precious	Won
Satellite Awards	December 20, 2009	Best Screenplay – Adapted	Geoffrey Fletcher	Won
Satellite Awards	December 20, 2009	Best Supporting Female	Mo'Nique	Won
Satellite Awards	December 20, 2009	Top 10 Films	Precious	Won
Satellite Awards	December 20, 2009	Outstanding New Talent	Gabourey Sidibe	Won
Satellite Awards	December 20, 2009	Best Film – Drama	Precious	Nominated
Satellite Awards	December 20, 2009	Best Director	Lee Daniels	Nominated
Satellite Awards	December 20, 2009	Best Original Song ("I Can See in Color")	Mary J. Blige	Nominated
San Diego Film Critics Society Awards	December 15, 2009	Best Supporting Actress	Mo'Nique	Nominated
San Francisco Film Critics Circle	December 14, 2009	Best Supporting Actress	Mo'Nique	Won
Screen Actors Guild Awards	January 23, 2010	Outstanding Performance by a Female Actor in a Leading Role	Gabourey Sidibe	Nominated
Screen Actors Guild Awards	January 23, 2010	Outstanding Performance by a Cast in a Motion Picture	Precious	Nominated
Screen Actors Guild Awards	January 23, 2010	Outstanding Performance by a Female Actor in a Supporting Role	Mo'Nique	Won
Southeastern Film Critics Association	December 13, 2009	Top 10 Films	Precious	Won
Southeastern Film Critics Association	December 13, 2009	Best Supporting Actress	Mo'Nique	Won
St. Louis Gateway Film Critics Awards	December 21, 2009	Best Performance by an Actress in a Supporting Role	Mo'Nique	Won
St. Louis Gateway Film Critics Awards	December 21, 2009	Best Picture	Precious	Nominated
St. Louis Gateway Film Critics Awards	December 21, 2009	Best Actress	Gabourey Sidibe	Nominated
St. Louis Gateway Film Critics Awards	December 21, 2009	Special Merit ("Favorite Scene")	Precious	Nominated
Stockholm International Film Festival	November 18 – 29, 2009	Bronze Horse	Lee Daniels	Nominated
Stockholm International Film Festival	November 18 – 29, 2009	FIPRESCI Prize – Honorable Mention	Lee Daniels	Won
Stockholm International Film Festival	November 18 – 29, 2009	Best Actress	Mo'Nique	Won
Sundance Film Festival	January 24, 2009	Special Jury Prize	Mo'Nique	Won
Toronto International Film Festival	September 19, 2009	People's Choice Award	Lee Daniels	Won
USC Scripter Award	February 6, 2010	Scripter Award	Geoffrey Fletcher and Sapphire	Nominated
Utah Film Critics Association Award	December 18, 2009	Best Supporting Actress	Mo'Nique	Won
Washington D.C. Area Film Critics Association Awards	December 7, 2009	Best Breakthrough Performance	Gabourey Sidibe	Won
Washington D.C. Area Film Critics Association Awards	December 7, 2009	Best Supporting Actress	Mo'Nique	Won
Washington D.C. Area Film Critics Association Awards	December 7, 2009	Best Film	Precious	Nominated
Washington D.C. Area Film Critics Association Awards	December 7, 2009	Best Director	Lee Daniels	Nominated
Washington D.C. Area Film Critics Association Awards	December 7, 2009	Best Actress	Gabourey Sidibe	Nominated
Washington D.C. Area Film Critics Association Awards	December 7, 2009	Best Screenplay – Adapted	Geoffrey Fletcher	Nominated
Washington D.C. Area Film Critics Association Awards	December 7, 2009	Best Ensemble	Precious	Nominated
Women's Film Critics Circle Award	December 9, 2009	Best Young Actress	Gabourey Sidibe	Won
Women's Film Critics Circle Award	December 9, 2009	Adrienne Shelly Award	Precious	Won
Writers Guild of America Awards	February 20, 2010	Adapted Screenplay	Geoffrey Fletcher	Nominated
