= Stinkers Bad Movie Awards =

Annual show honoring the worst in film

- Stinkers Bad Movie Awards logo
- Awarded for: Worst in film
- Country: United States
- Presented by: Hastings Bad Cinema Society
- First award: 1978; 48 years ago
- Final award: 2006; 20 years ago

The Stinkers Bad Movie Awards (formerly known as the Hastings Bad Cinema Society) was a Los Angeles–area-based group of film buffs and film critics devoted to honoring the worst films of the year.

The society was founded by Mike Lancaster and Ray Wright, two former ushers who met in the late 1970s at what is now the Pacific Theatres's Hastings Theater in Pasadena, California (from which the society originally got its name).

== History ==
=== Founding ===
Lancaster and Wright offered the annual Stinkers Bad Movie Awards, which was a parody of the Academy Awards. The Stinkers were similar to the Golden Raspberry Awards (the "Razzies"), which debuted four years after the Stinkers. Aside from the usual categories one might expect in an Oscar parody (Worst Picture, Worst Actor, etc.), the Stinkers offered other categories such as Worst Fake Accent, Most Painfully Unfunny Comedy, Least 'Special' Special Effects and Worst On-Screen Hairstyle. Unlike the Razzies, the Stinkers did not have an awards ceremony.

=== The Stinkers' first ballots ===
A Stinkers trophy, originally introduced to "honour" Tom Green for Freddy Got Fingered. Since he never accepted it, they then offered it to Halle Berry for Catwoman to no avail.

The Stinkers' first ballots were handed out to the public in 1997. In the years that followed, the Razzies and Stinkers rarely agreed on a list of nominees or winners. The Stinkers initially opened their balloting to the general moviegoing public but soon discovered that most people surveyed hadn't seen many of the films on the ballot and often just voted for the person they hated the most, usually someone like Mariah Carey, the Spice Girls or anyone connected with the film Gigli.

In 2001, the Stinkers created 100 Years, 100 Stinkers: The Worst Films of the 20th Century, a list that parodied AFI's 100 Years...100 Movies list. The next year the Stinkers made a special trophy of a miniature flushing toilet with film wrapped around it for comedian actor Tom Green. Green's Freddy Got Fingered was nominated for seven awards and won Worst Film, Worst Sense of Direction, Worst Actor and Most Painfully Unfunny Comedy. That same year the Stinkers gave a special award to David Manning, the controversial Sony Pictures fictitious movie critic. The Stinkers included in 2003 another special category for Worst Performance by a Child, dedicated to child actor Spencer Breslin.

In 2004, the Stinkers went to a more selective way of obtaining votes. They dismantled their membership and offered ballots by invitation only to a small, select group of film geeks and critics, who had seen a majority of the films during the year.

=== Nominating Paris Hilton ===
In 2006, the Stinkers refused to nominate hotel heiress Paris Hilton for her supporting role in the horror film House of Wax. Said Lancaster, "To get on the Stinkers ballot you are judged on your performance, not your tabloid persona. Anyone that would put Paris Hilton on a list of the five worst supporting actresses in 2005 didn't see a lot of movies in 2005. I could list twelve actresses who gave worse supporting performances than Paris Hilton."

The next year, the Stinkers did nominate Hilton for Worst Actress for her performance in the barely released National Lampoon's Pledge This!.

=== Closure ===
In late January 2007, following the announcement of the year's winners, the Stinkers website announced it would be officially closed down after ten years on the internet. On July 1, 2007, four months after both the announcement of the worst of 2006 winners and the release of its expanded 1981 ballot, the site was taken down.

== Award categories ==
=== Motion picture ===
- Worst Picture: 1978 to 2006
- Worst Performance by an Actor in a Lead Role: 1978 to 1981, 1993 to 2006
- Worst Performance by an Actress in a Lead Role: 1978 to 1981, 1993 to 2006
- Worst Performance by an Actor in a Supporting Role: 1978 to 1981, 1996 to 2006
- Worst Performance by an Actress in a Supporting Role: 1978 to 1981, 1996 to 2006
- Worst Sense of Direction: 1978 to 1981, 1997 to 2006
- Worst Screenplay/Worst Screenplay for a Film Grossing Over $100 Million Worldwide: 1978 to 1981, 1996 to 2006
- Most Painfully Unfunny Comedy: 1978 to 1981, 1995 to 2006
- Worst On-Screen Couple: 1978 to 1981, 1997 to 2006
- Worst On-Screen Group: 1978 to 1979, 2000 to 2003
- Worst On-Screen Hairstyle: 1981, 1996, 1998 to 2001, 2006
- Most Annoying Fake Accent: 1978 to 1981, 1997 to 2000, 2006
- Worst Performance by a Child in a Featured Role: 1980 to 1981, 1999, 2003 to 2006
- Worst Sequel: 1978 to 1981, 1993 to 2006
- Most Annoying Non-Human Character: 1978 to 1979, 2002 to 2003
- The Sequel Nobody Was Clamoring For: 1993 to 2000
- Worst Remake: 1980 to 1981, 1999 to 2000, 2002, 2005 to 2006
- Worst Resurrection of a TV Show: 1993 to 1994, 1996 to 2000, 2002 to 2005
- Worst Song in a Motion Picture: 1978 to 1981, 1998 to 2006
- Most Intrusive Musical Score: 1980 to 1981, 1999 to 2006
- Least "Special" Special Effects: 1979 to 1981, 1999 to 2000, 2003 to 2006
- Most Unwelcome Direct-to-Video Release: 1997 to 2001
- Worst Achievement in Animation/Worst Animated Film: 1999 to 2000, 2005 to 2006
- Most Overrated Film: 2003, 2005 to 2006
- Worst Christmas Film: 2004, 2006

=== Special awards ===
Special categories have also been introduced for specific years. Some have been in multiple ballots while others were used one time.

==== Recurring special awards ====
- Founders Award – What Were They Thinking and Why?

1993: Short Cuts
1994: I'll Do Anything and Prêt-à-Porter
1995: Johnny Mnemonic
1996: The Phantom and The Stupids
1997: Cats Don't Dance, Crash, Jungle 2 Jungle, and Year of the Horse
1998: The Academy of Motion Pictures Arts and Sciences, for giving the Lifetime Achievement Award to Elia Kazan; the Motion Picture Association of America for rating Babe: Pig in the City G and Orgazmo NC-17; and Universal Pictures for its shot-for-shot remake of Psycho
1999: The Motion Picture Association of America for rating Eyes Wide Shut R.

- Founders Award

2000: Motion Picture Association of America for rating Scary Movie R.
2001: David Manning, Sony Pictures' fictitious movie critic.

- The Spencer Breslin Award (Worst Performance by a Child Actor)

2003: Spencer Breslin (The Cat in the Hat)

Other nominations: Dakota Fanning (The Cat in the Hat and Uptown Girls), Lydia Jordan (Gods and Generals), Frankie Muniz (Agent Cody Banks), and Daryl Sabara (Spy Kids 3-D: Game Over)

2004: Soren Fulton (Thunderbirds)
2005: Adrian Alonso (The Legend of Zorro)

Other nominations: Jake Church (Brokeback Mountain), Jacob Davich (The Adventures of Sharkboy and Lavagirl in 3-D), Aaron Michael Drozin (Fun with Dick and Jane), and Max Thieriot (The Pacifier)

2006: Spencer Breslin (The Santa Clause 3: The Escape Clause, The Shaggy Dog, and Zoom)

Other nominations: Tristan Lake Leabu (Superman Returns), Grayson Russell (Talladega Nights: The Ballad of Ricky Bobby), Dominique Saldana (Unaccompanied Minors), and Houston Tumlin (Talladega Nights: The Ballad of Ricky Bobby)

==== One-off Special Awards ====
Year	Category	Winner	Nominees (if any)
1993	Worst Fake Beards	Gettysburg	
1996	Biggest Acting Stretch	Ellen DeGeneres plays a heterosexual woman (Mr. Wrong)	
1997	Lifetime Non-Achievement Award - The Hall of Shame	Chevy Chase	Mel Brooks; Whoopi Goldberg; Burt Reynolds
1999	Biggest Disappointment (Films that didn't live up to their hype)	The Blair Witch Project	Eyes Wide Shut; Pokémon: The First Movie; Star Wars Episode I: The Phantom Menace; Wild Wild West
2005	Less Than Dynamic Duo (not to be confused with Worst On-Screen Couple)	Samuel L. Jackson and Eugene Levy in The Man	Sandra Bullock and Regina King in Miss Congeniality 2: Armed and Fabulous; Cedric the Entertainer and Mike Epps in The Honeymooners; Nathan Lane and Matthew Broderick in The Producers; Seann William Scott and Johnny Knoxville in The Dukes of Hazzard
2005	Special "Annie" Award for Ticket Price Gouging	The Producers ($2.50 more than other movies playing at the same selected theatres!)	
2006	Worst Movie Title	Talladega Nights: The Ballad of Ricky Bobby	Barnyard: The Original Party Animals; Borat: Cultural Learnings of America for Make Benefit Glorious Nation of Kazakhstan; The Santa Clause 3: The Escape Clause; Snakes on a Plane

== Ceremonies ==
- 1978
- 1979
- 1980
- 1981
- 1982
- 1983
- 1984
- 1985
- 1986
- 1987
- 1988
- 1989
- 1990
- 1991
- 1992
- 1993
- 1994
- 1995
- 1996
- 1997
- 1998
- 1999
- 2000
- 2001
- 2002
- 2003
- 2004
- 2005
- 2006

== See also ==
- Academy Awards
- The Golden Turkey Awards
- Golden Raspberry Awards
- List of films considered the worst
- Box-office bomb
