= David Manning (fictitious writer) =

Fictitious film critic

David Manning (sometimes "Dave") was a pseudonym used by a marketing executive around July 2000 to give consistently good reviews for releases from Sony subsidiary Columbia Pictures. Several fictional review quotes attributed to "David Manning" were used in the promotion of medieval action/drama A Knight's Tale (describing Heath Ledger as "this year's hottest new star!") and Rob Schneider's comedy The Animal ("Another winner!"), the latter of which generally received poor reviews by real critics. The story emerged in mid-2001 in connection with the film The Patriot.

== Background ==
The usage of quotations in advertisement is an important part of film promotion. Film studios use quotations of reviews from film critics to demonstrate to the general public that the movie is worth their money and time. However, studios are given a lot of leeway on how quotations are represented. While advertisement campaigns must be approved by the Motion Picture Association, the MPA does not check quotations on advertisements for their accuracy. Because of this, studios may shorten quotes or remove context from them, both to keep things brief and to put as much positive spin as possible. In a 1999 Los Angeles Times article about the role critics play in movie advertising, DreamWorks Pictures marketing executive Terry Press remarked, "We are a sound bite culture [...] You just take the sound bite. If they didn't say it exactly the way you want, you just take the part of what they said that you do want [...] and if they don't say what you want, you just make it up yourself anyway."

== Details ==
Manning was named after a friend of Matthew Cramer, the Sony marketing executive responsible for the insertions. Manning was credited to The Ridgefield Press, a small weekly newspaper from Ridgefield, Connecticut that actually published film reviews written by the father-and-son team of Mark and Jonathan Schumann.

During an investigation into Manning's quotes, Newsweek reporter John Horn discovered that the newspaper had never heard of him. The story emerged in mid-2001, around the same time as an announcement that Sony had used employees posing as moviegoers in television commercials to praise the Mel Gibson film The Patriot. These occurrences, in tandem, raised questions and controversy about ethics in film promotion practices.

On June 10, 2001, on an episode of Le Show, host Harry Shearer conducted an in-studio interview with David Manning. The voice of Manning was provided by a computer voice synthesizer.

On August 3, 2005, Sony made an out-of-court settlement and agreed to refund $5 each to dissatisfied customers who saw Hollow Man, The Animal, The Patriot, A Knight's Tale, or Vertical Limit in American theaters as a result of Manning's reviews.
