= Jon Voight on screen and stage =

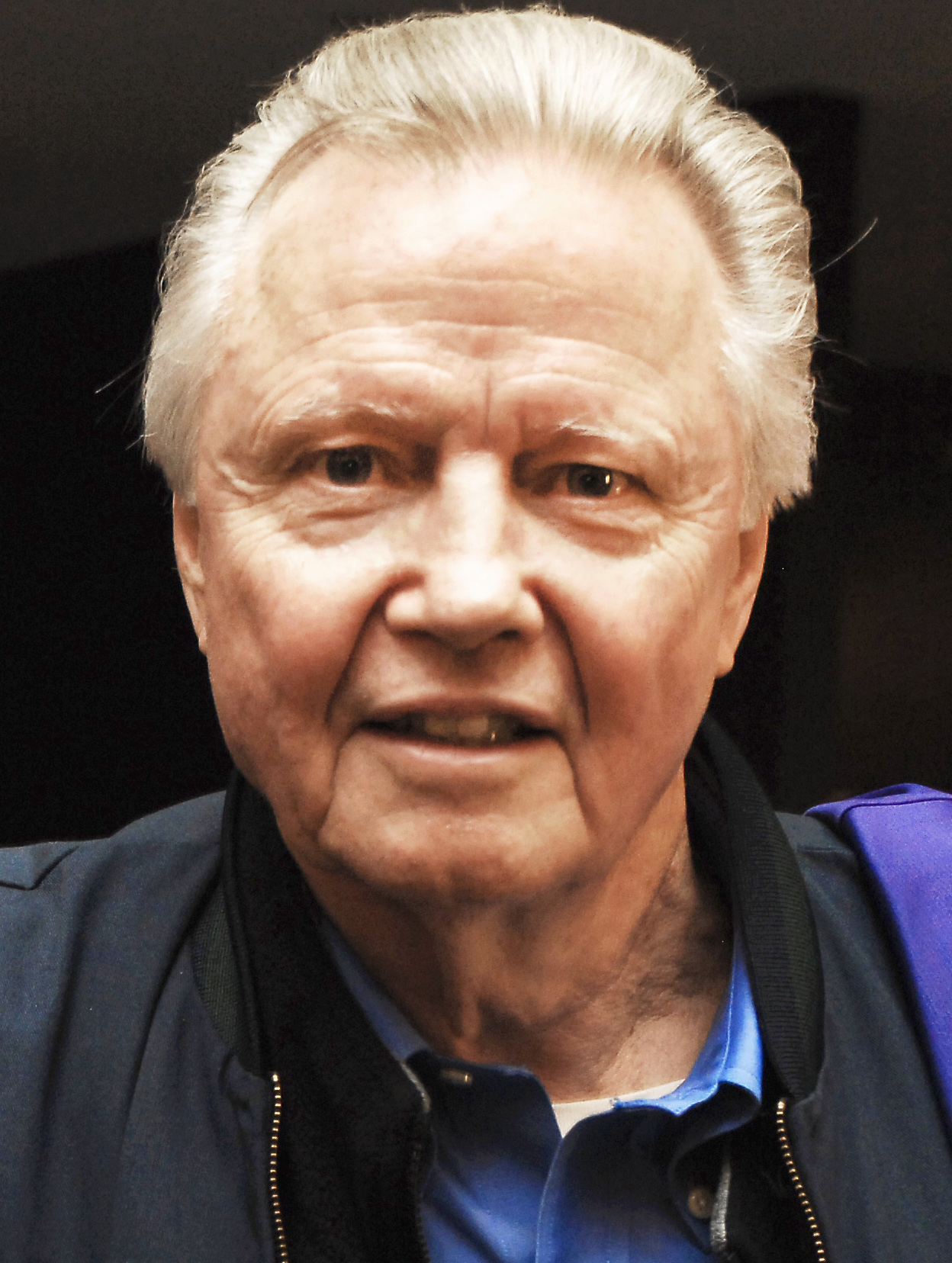
Jon Voight in 2012

Jonathan Vincent Voight (/ˈvɔɪt/; born December 29, 1938) is an American actor. Voight is associated with the angst and unruliness that typified the late-1960s counterculture. He has received numerous accolades, including an Academy Award, a British Academy Film Award, and four Golden Globe Awards as well as nominations for four Primetime Emmy Awards. In 2019, he was awarded the National Medal of Arts. Films in which Voight has appeared have grossed more than $5.2 billion worldwide.

Voight won the Academy Award for Best Actor for his portrayal of a paraplegic Vietnam veteran in Coming Home (1978). His other Oscar-nominated roles were for playing Joe Buck, a would-be gigolo, in Midnight Cowboy (1969), a ruthless bank robber Oscar "Manny" Manheim in Runaway Train (1985) and as sportscaster Howard Cosell in Ali (2001). Other notable films include Deliverance (1972), The Champ (1979), Heat (1995), Mission: Impossible (1996), The Rainmaker (1997), Enemy of the State (1998), Pearl Harbor (2001), Zoolander (2001), Holes (2003), Glory Road (2006), Transformers (2007), and Pride and Glory (2008). He is also known for his role in the National Treasure film series.

Voight is also known for his television roles, including as Nazi officer Jürgen Stroop in Uprising (2001) and Pope John Paul II on the eponymous miniseries (2005). His role as Mickey Donovan on the Showtime drama series Ray Donovan brought him newfound acclaim and attention among critics and audiences, as well as his fourth Golden Globe win in 2014. He also appeared on the thriller series 24 in its seventh season.

== Acting credits ==
=== Film ===
Year	Title	Role	Notes	Ref.
1967	Fearless Frank	Fearless Frank		
1967	Hour of the Gun	Bill 'Curly Bill' Brocius		
1969	Midnight Cowboy	Joe Buck		
1969	Out of It	Russ		
1970	Catch-22	1st Lieutenant Milo Minderbinder		
1970	The Revolutionary	A		
1972	Deliverance	Ed Gentry		
1973	The All-American Boy	Vic Bealer		
1974	Conrack	Pat Conroy		
1974	The Odessa File	Peter Miller		
1975	End of the Game	Walter Tschanz	Only released in West Germany in 1978	
1978	Coming Home	Luke Martin		
1979	The Champ	Billy Flynn		
1982	Lookin' to Get Out	Alex Kovac	Also writer	
1983	Table for Five	J.P. Tannen		
1985	Runaway Train	Oscar 'Manny' Manheim		
1986	Desert Bloom	Jack Chismore		
1990	Eternity	Edward / James	Also writer	
1995	Heat	Nate		
1996	Mission: Impossible	Jim Phelps		
1997	The Rainmaker	Leo F. Drummond		
1997	Rosewood	John Wright		
1997	Anaconda	Paul Serone		
1997	U Turn	Blind Man		
1997	Most Wanted	General Adam Woodward / Lt. Col. Grant Casey		
1998	Enemy of the State	Thomas Brian Reynolds		
1998	The General	Ned Kenny		
1999	Baby Geniuses	Unknown	Co-executive producer	
1999	Varsity Blues	Coach Bud Kilmer		
1999	A Dog of Flanders	Michael La Grande		
2001	Zoolander	Larry Zoolander		
2001	Lara Croft: Tomb Raider	Lord Richard Croft		
2001	Pearl Harbor	Franklin D. Roosevelt		
2001	Ali	Howard Cosell		
2003	Holes	Marion Seville / Mr Sir		
2004	Superbabies: Baby Geniuses 2	Bill Biscane / Kane		
2004	The Manchurian Candidate	Senator Thomas Jordan		
2004	National Treasure	Patrick Gates		
2006	The Legend of Simon Conjurer	Dr. Crazx	Shot in 2006, but not released until 2014 as Deadly Lessons.	
2006	Glory Road	Adolph Rupp		
2007	September Dawn	Jacob Samuelson		
2007	Transformers	Mr. John Keller		
2007	Bratz	Principal Dimly	Also known as Bratz: The Movie	
2007	National Treasure: Book of Secrets	Patrick Henry Gates		
2008	Pride and Glory	Assistant Chief Francis Tierney Sr.		
2008	Four Christmases	Creighton		
2008	An American Carol	George Washington		
2008	Tropic Thunder	Himself	Cameo	
2011	Beatles Stories	Himself	Documentary	
2012	Casting By	Himself	Documentary	
2012	Beyond	Jon Koski		
2012	Pablo	Himself	Documentary	
2013	Baby Geniuses and the Mystery of the Crown Jewels	Taxi Driver	Direct-to-video	
2013	Getaway	Mysterious Voice		
2013	Dracula: The Dark Prince	Leonardo Van Helsing		
2014	Baby Geniuses and the Treasure of Egypt	Moriarty	Direct-to-video	
2014	The Final Song	Unknown	Executive producer	
2015	Woodlawn	Paul 'Bear' Bryant		
2015	Baby Geniuses and the Space Baby	Moriarty	Direct-to-video	
2016	Fantastic Beasts and Where to Find Them	Henry Shaw Sr.		
2016	American Wrestler: The Wizard	Principal Skinner Sr.		
2017	Same Kind of Different as Me	Earl Hall		
2018	Surviving the Wild	Grandfather Gus	Also known as Riley's Peak	
2018	Orphan Horse	Ben Crowley		
2019	Love, Antosha	Himself	Documentary	
2020	Roe v. Wade	Warren E. Burger		
2022	Dangerous Game: The Legacy Murders	Ellison Betts		
2022	Desperate Souls, Dark City and the Legend of Midnight Cowboy	Himself	Documentary	
2023	Mercy	Patrick Quinn		
2024	The Painter	Byrne		
2024	Megalopolis	Hamilton Crassus III		
2024	Shadow Land	Robert Wainwright		
2024	Reagan	Viktor Petrovich		
2024	Strangers	Richard		
2025	Man with No Past	Sanborn		
2025	High Ground	Ezra Wilcott		
2025	The Last Gunfight	Nathaniel Turner		
2026	Monument	Yakov Rechter		

=== Television ===
Year	Title	Role	Notes	Ref.
1963	Naked City	Victor Binks	Episode: "Alive and Still a Second Lieutenant"	
1963	The Defenders	Cliff Wakeman	2 episodes	
1966	Summer Fun	Unknown	Episode: "Kwimpers of New Jersey"	
1966	NET Playhouse	Unknown	Episode: "A Sleep of Prisoners"	
1966	12 O'Clock High	Captain Karl Holtke	Episode: "Graveyard"	
1966–1968	Gunsmoke	Steven Downing / Cory in Prairie Wolfer / Petter Karlgren	3 episodes	
1967	Coronet Blue	Peter Wicklow	Episode: "The Rebels"	
1967	N.Y.P.D.	Adam	Episode: "The Bombers"	
1968	Cimarron Strip	Bill Mason	Episode: "Without Honor"	
1991	Chernobyl: The Final Warning	Dr. Robert Gale	Television film	
1992	The Rainbow Warrior	Peter Willcox	Television film	
1992	The Last of His Tribe	Professor Alfred Kroeber	Television film	
1993	Return to Lonesome Dove	Captain Woodrow F. Call	Miniseries	
1994	Seinfeld	Himself	Episode: "The Mom & Pop Store"	
1995	The Tin Soldier	Yarik	Television film; also director	
1995	Convict Cowboy	Ry Weston	Television film	
1998	The Fixer	Jack Killoran	Television film; executive producer	
1999	Noah's Ark	Noah	Miniseries	
2000	The Princess & the Barrio Boy	Unknown	Television film; executive producer	
2001	Uprising	Major General Jürgen Stroop	Television film	
2001	Jack and the Beanstalk: The Real Story	Sigfriend 'Siggy' Mannheim	Miniseries	
2002	Second String	Head Coach Chuck Dichter	Television film	
2003	Jasper, Texas	Sheriff Billy Rowles	Television film	
2004	The Five People You Meet in Heaven	Eddie	Television film	
2004	The Karate Dog	Hamilton Cage	Television film	
2005	Pope John Paul II	Pope John Paul II	Miniseries	
2008	24: Redemption	Jonas Hodges	Television film	
2009	24	Jonas Hodges	Recurring guest role (season 7)	
2010	Lone Star	Clint Thatcher	2 episodes	
2013–2020	Ray Donovan	Mickey Donovan	Main role	
2016	J.L. Family Ranch	John Landsburg	Television film	
2020	J.L. Family Ranch: The Wedding Gift	John Landsburg	Television film	
2022	Ray Donovan: The Movie	Mickey Donovan	Television film	
2025	Pawn Stars	Himself	Episode: "The Champ Pays a Call"	

=== Theater ===
Year	Title	Role	Notes	Ref.
1959	The Sound of Music	Rolf Gruber (replacement)	Lunt-Fontanne Theatre, Broadway debut	
1966	The Tempest	Ariel	The Old Globe, San Diego	
1966	Romeo and Juliet	Romeo	The Old Globe, San Diego	
1967	That Summer - That Fall	Steve	Helen Hayes Theatre, Broadway	
1975	The Hashish Club	Producer only	Bijou Theatre, Broadway	
1976	Hamlet	Prince Hamlet	The Old Globe, San Diego	
1992	The Seagull	Trigorin	Lyceum Theatre, Broadway	
