= Broncho Billy's Christmas Spirit =

1914 film by Gilbert M. Anderson

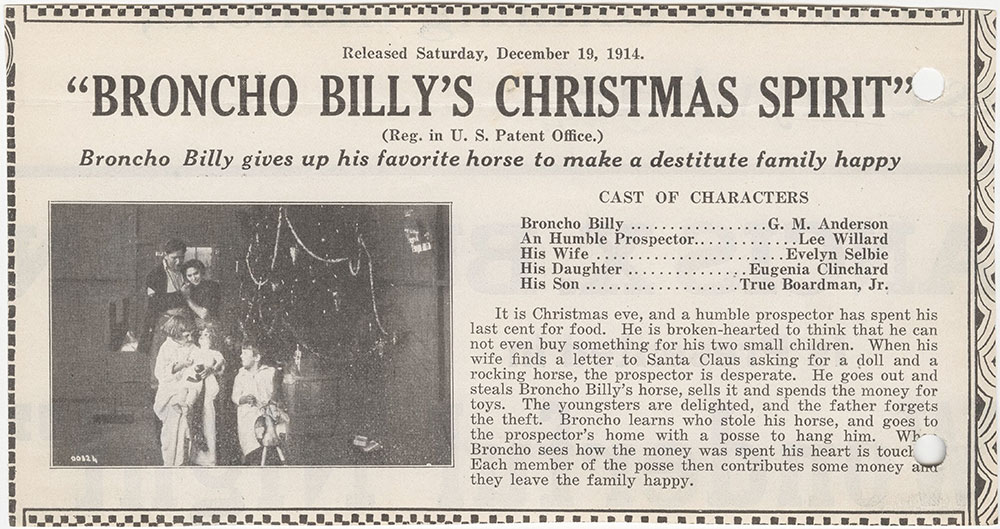
- Directed by: Gilbert M. Anderson
- Starring: Gilbert M. Anderson; Evelyn Selbie
- Production company: Essanay Studios
- Distributed by: General Film Company
- Release date: December 19, 1914
- Running time: 1 reel
- Country: United States
- Language: Silent (English intertitles)

Broncho Billy's Christmas Spirit is a lost 1914 American silent Western and Christmas film directed by and starring Gilbert M. Anderson.

== Plot ==
It's bad enough that a struggling prospector has no money to buy Christmas presents for his children. But when he sees a wish-list from the children, hoping for a doll and a rocking horse, he just has to find a way to get them what they wish for. So he goes out and steals Broncho Billy's horse. With the money from selling the horse, his children's Christmas wishes come true. But the father's crime gets found out. Broncho Billy shows up at his door with a search party to hang him. But when he learns how the poor prospector has used the money, his heart melts. Billy and all members of the search party give a bit of money and leave them to continue with a happy Christmas.

== Cast ==
- Gilbert M. Anderson as Broncho Billy
- Lee Willard as The Prospector
- Evelyn Selbie as The Prospector's Wife
- Eugenia Clinchard as The Prospector's Daughter
- True Eames Boardman as The Prospector's Son

== Background ==
Broncho Billy's Christmas Spirit was recorded in Niles (now Fremont, California). The film is a production of the Essanay Film Manufacturing Company and was initially announced under the title Broncho Billy and Christmas Day. It was released in theaters on December 19, 1914.

== Review ==
Film scholars Lane Roth and Tom W. Hoffer cite Broncho Billy's Christmas Spirit as an example of how Broncho Billy's transformation from violent bandit or otherwise negatively connoted character to benefactor and the recurring motif of self-sacrifice take up Christian ideals: bravery, celibacy, remorse and willingness to sacrifice. In addition, the role of Broncho Billy reflects the constant battle between good and evil for people's souls.

According to the reviewer at Moving Picture World, Broncho Billy's Christmas Spirit, with its Western cast, shows how Christmas steals its way into the hearts of tough guys and softens them. Anderson incorporated more human nature and emotion into his short film than could be seen in some ambitious feature films. All of this is presented beautifully and in a way that makes the audience sigh deeply.
