= Jon Voight =

American actor (born 1938)

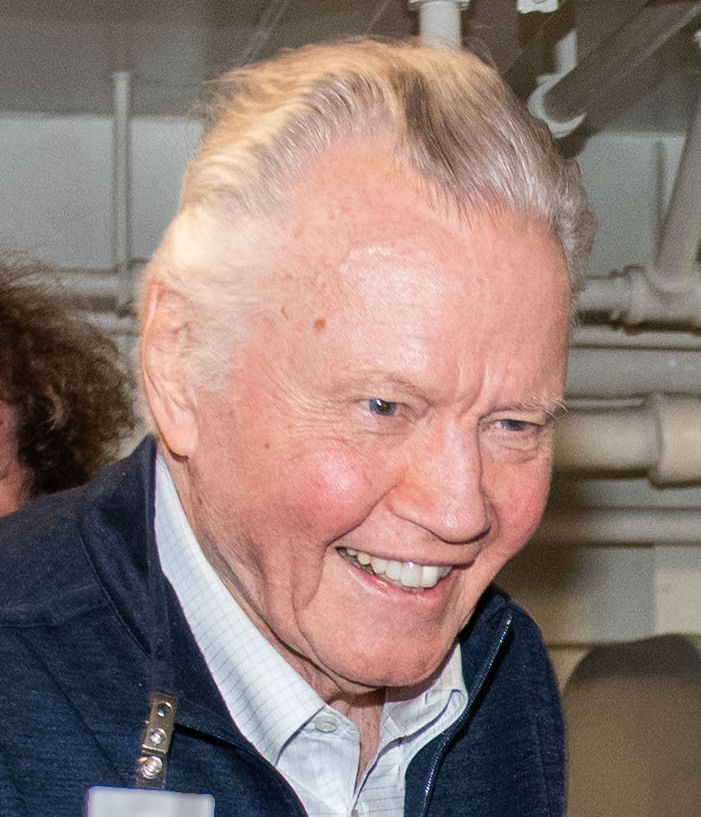
- Voight in 2024
- Born: Jonathan Paul Voight; December 29, 1938 (age 87); Yonkers, New York, U.S.
- Education: Catholic University of America; Neighborhood School of Theatre
- Occupation: Actor
- Years active: 1961–present
- Works: Full list
- Spouses: Lauri Peters (m. 1962; div. 1967) Marcheline Bertrand (m. 1971; div. 1980)
- Children: James Haven; Angelina Jolie
- Relatives: Barry Voight (brother); Chip Taylor (brother)
- Awards: Full list

Special Ambassador to Hollywood
- Incumbent
- Assumed office January 20, 2025 Serving with Mel Gibson
- President: Donald Trump
- Preceded by: Position established

Jonathan Paul Voight (/vɔɪt/ VOYT; born December 29, 1938) is an American actor. Throughout his 6 decade career, he has received numerous accolades, including an Academy Award, a British Academy Film Award, and four Golden Globe Awards as well as nominations for four Primetime Emmy Awards. In 2019, he was awarded the National Medal of Arts. Films in which Voight has appeared have grossed more than $5.2 billion worldwide.

Associated with the angst and unruliness that typified the late 1960s counterculture, Voight won the Academy Award for Best Actor for his portrayal of a paraplegic Vietnam veteran in Coming Home (1978). His other Oscar nominations are for playing Joe Buck, a would-be gigolo, in Midnight Cowboy (1969); ruthless bank robber Oscar "Manny" Manheim in Runaway Train (1985); and sportscaster Howard Cosell in Ali (2001). His other notable films include Deliverance (1972), The Odessa File (1974), The Champ (1979), Heat (1995), Mission: Impossible (1996), The Rainmaker (1997), Enemy of the State (1998), Pearl Harbor, Zoolander (both 2001), Holes (2003), National Treasure (2004), Glory Road (2006), Transformers, National Treasure: Book of Secrets (both 2007), and Pride and Glory (2008).

Voight is also known for his television roles, including as Nazi SS officer Jürgen Stroop in Uprising (2001) and Pope John Paul II on the eponymous miniseries (2005). His role as Mickey Donovan on the Showtime drama series Ray Donovan brought him newfound acclaim and attention among critics and audiences, as well as his fourth Golden Globe win in 2014. He also appeared on the thriller series 24 in its seventh season.

Despite earlier having liberal views, Voight has gained attention in his later years for his outspoken conservative and religious beliefs. He is the father of actress Angelina Jolie and actor James Haven.

== Early life and education ==
Jonathan Paul Voight was born on December 29, 1938, in Yonkers, New York, to Barbara (née Kamp) and Elmer Voight (né Voytka), a professional golfer. He has two brothers, Barry Voight, a former volcanologist at Pennsylvania State University, and James Wesley Voight, known as Chip Taylor (1940–2026), a singer-songwriter who wrote "Wild Thing" and "Angel of the Morning". Voight's paternal grandfather and his paternal grandmother's parents were Slovak immigrants, while his maternal grandfather and his maternal grandmother's parents were German immigrants. Political activist Joseph P. Kamp was his great-uncle through his mother.

Voight was raised as a Catholic and attended the Catholic boys' Archbishop Stepinac High School in White Plains, New York, where he first took an interest in acting. Following his graduation in 1956, he enrolled at Catholic University of America in Washington, D.C., where he majored in art and graduated with a B.A. degree in 1960. After graduation, Voight moved to New York City, where he pursued an acting career. He graduated from the Neighborhood Playhouse School of the Theatre, where he studied under Sanford Meisner.

== Career ==
=== 1961–1969: Early roles and breakthrough ===
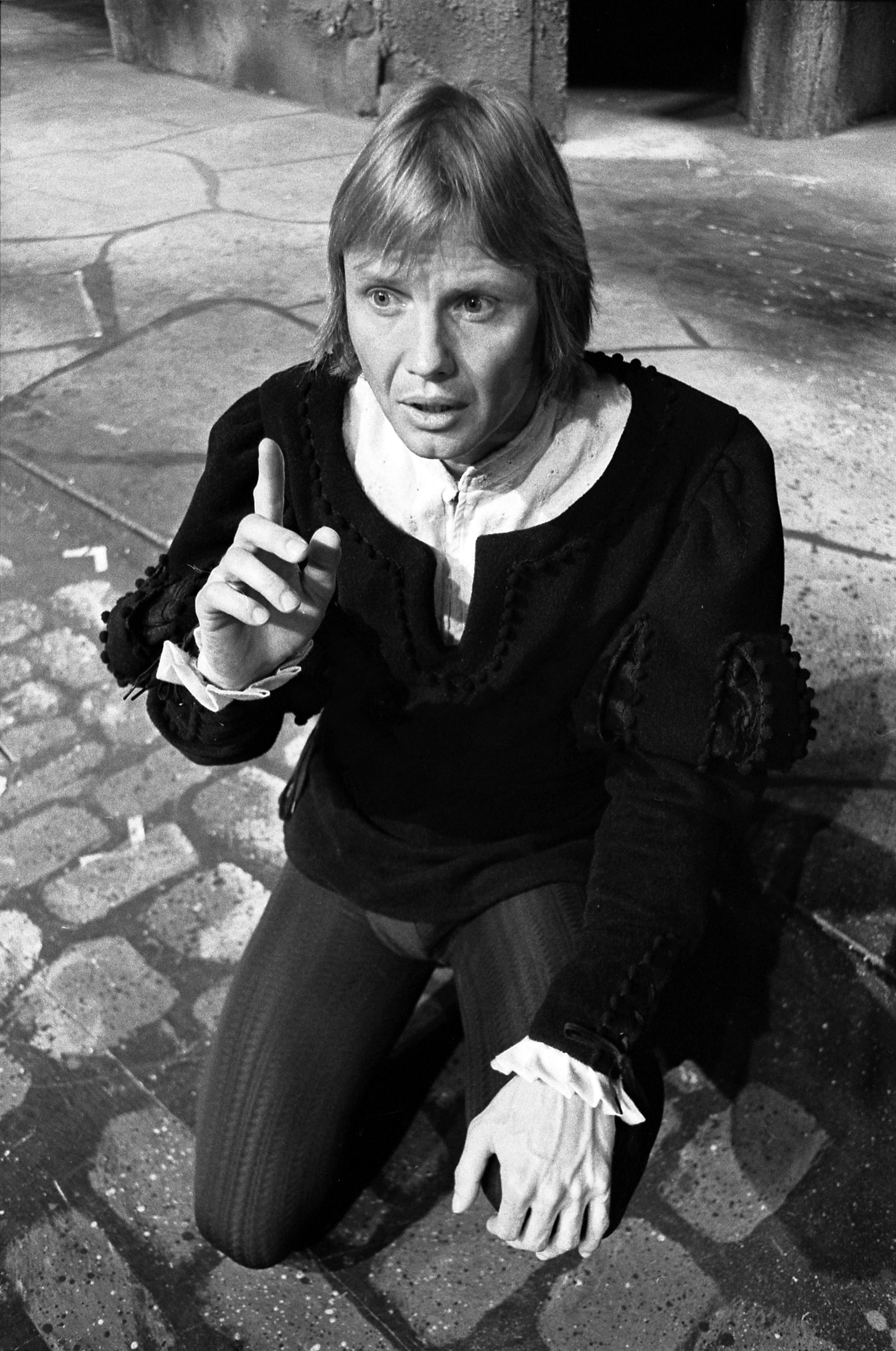
Voight as Prince Hamlet in Hamlet in 1976

Voight started his off-Broadway career in a revue called O Oysters, which ran in early 1961. He made his Broadway debut in the fall of 1961 as Rolf in The Sound of Music. In the early 1960s, Voight found work in television, appearing in several episodes of Gunsmoke, between 1963 and 1968, as well as guest spots on Naked City and The Defenders, both in 1963, Twelve O'Clock High in 1966, and Cimarron Strip in 1968. Voight's theater career took off in January 1965, playing Rodolfo in Arthur Miller's A View from the Bridge in an Off-Broadway revival. Voight's film debut did not come until 1967, when he took a part in Phillip Kaufman's crimefighter spoof, Fearless Frank. He also took a small role in the 1967 western Hour of the Gun, directed by veteran helmer John Sturges. In 1968 he took a role in director Paul Williams's Out of It.

In 1968, Voight was cast in the groundbreaking Midnight Cowboy (1969), the film that would make his career. He played Joe Buck, a naïve male hustler from Texas, adrift in New York City. He comes under the tutelage of Dustin Hoffman's Ratso Rizzo, a tubercular petty thief and con artist. The film explored late 1960s New York and the development of an unlikely, but poignant friendship between the two main characters. Directed by John Schlesinger and based on a novel by James Leo Herlihy, the film struck a chord with critics and audiences. Because of its controversial themes, the film was released with an X rating and would make history by being the only X-rated feature to win Best Picture at the Academy Awards. Both Voight and Hoffman were nominated for Best Actor, but lost out to John Wayne in True Grit.

=== 1970–1989: Stardom and acclaim ===
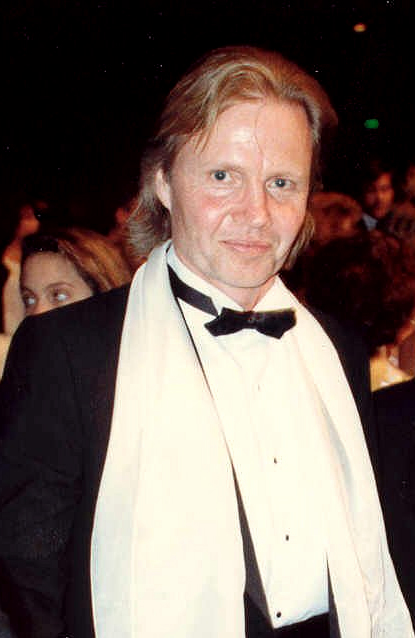
Voight at the Academy Awards in April 1988

In 1970, Voight appeared in Mike Nichols's adaptation of Catch-22, and re-teamed with director Paul Williams to star in The Revolutionary, as a left-wing college student struggling with his conscience. Voight next starred in 1972's Deliverance. Directed by John Boorman, from a script that James Dickey had helped to adapt from his own novel of the same name, it tells the story of a canoe trip in a feral, backwoods America. Both the film and the performances of Voight and co-stars Burt Reynolds and Ned Beatty received great critical acclaim, and were popular with audiences. Voight also appeared at the Studio Arena Theater, in Buffalo, New York, in the Tennessee Williams play A Streetcar Named Desire from 1973 to 1974 as Stanley Kowalski.

Voight played a directionless young boxer in 1973's The All American Boy, then appeared in the 1974 film Conrack, directed by Martin Ritt. Based on Pat Conroy's autobiographical novel The Water Is Wide, Voight portrayed the title character, an idealistic young schoolteacher sent to teach underprivileged black children on a remote South Carolina island. The same year he appeared in The Odessa File, based on Frederick Forsyth's thriller, as Peter Miller, a young German journalist who discovers a conspiracy to protect former Nazis still operating within Germany. This film first teamed him with the actor-director Maximilian Schell, who acted out a character named and based on the "Butcher of Riga" Eduard Roschmann, and for whom Voight would appear in 1975's End of the Game, a psychological thriller co-starring Jacqueline Bisset and based on a story by Swiss novelist and playwright Friedrich Dürrenmatt.

According to Joseph McBride's biography of Steven Spielberg, Voight was Spielberg's first choice for the role of Matt Hooper in the 1975 film Jaws and he turned down the role, which was ultimately played by Richard Dreyfuss. However, in interview with Dr. Ben Carson on September 6, 2024, Voight was asked if he turned down the part of Quint in Jaws; Voight said that the offer of a part in Jaws is "a myth" and that Spielberg had actually offered him a part in a different, less successful film, a role that he turned down because he thought it was a "repeat of the character from Midnight Cowboy". In 1978, Voight portrayed the Vietnam veteran Luke Martin in Hal Ashby's film Coming Home, and was awarded Best Actor at the Cannes Film Festival, for his portrait of a cynical, yet noble paraplegic, reportedly based on real-life Vietnam veteran-turned-antiwar-activist Ron Kovic, with whom Jane Fonda's character falls in love. The film included a much-talked-about love scene between the two. Fonda won her second Best Actress award for her role, and Voight won for Best Actor in a Leading Role at the Oscars. In 1979, Voight once again put on boxing gloves, starring as an alcoholic ex-heavyweight in Franco Zeffirelli's The Champ with Faye Dunaway and Ricky Schroder. The film was an international success, but less popular with American audiences.

Voight next reteamed with director Ashby in 1982's Lookin' to Get Out, in which he played Alex Kovac, a con man who has run into debt with New York mobsters and hopes to win enough in Las Vegas to pay them off. Voight both co-wrote the script and also co-produced. He also produced and acted in 1983's Table for Five, in which he played a widower bringing up his children by himself. Also in 1983, Voight was slated to play Robert Harmon in John Cassavetes's Golden Bear-winning Love Streams, having performed the role on stage in 1981. However, a few weeks before shooting began, Voight announced that he also wanted to direct the picture and was consequently dropped. In 1985, Voight teamed up with Russian writer and director Andrei Konchalovsky to play the role of escaped con Oscar "Manny" Manheim in Runaway Train. The script was based on a story by Akira Kurosawa, and paired Voight with Eric Roberts as a fellow escapee, and Rebecca De Mornay as an assistant locomotive engineer. Voight received an Academy Award nomination for Best Actor and won the Golden Globe's award for Best Actor. Roberts was also honored for his performance, receiving an Academy Award nomination for Best Supporting Actor. Voight followed up this and other performances with a role in the 1986 film, Desert Bloom, and reportedly experienced a "spiritual awakening" toward the end of the decade. In 1989, Voight starred in and helped write Eternity, which dealt with a television reporter's efforts to uncover corruption.

=== 1990–2012: Established actor ===
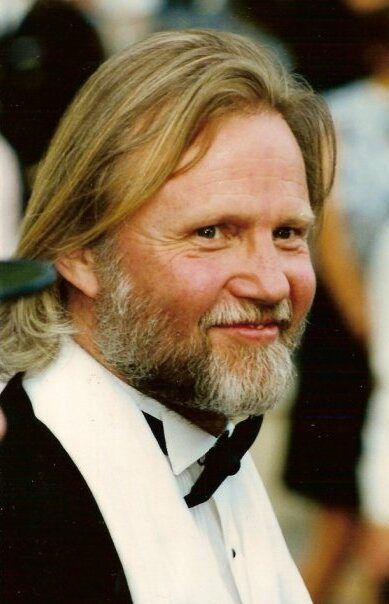
Voight at the Cannes Film Festival in 1993

Voight began acting in television productions in the early 1990s, beginning with 1991's Chernobyl: The Final Warning, followed in 1992 by The Last of His Tribe and The Rainbow Warrior, the story of the ill-fated Greenpeace ship sunk by French operatives in Auckland Harbour. For the remainder of the decade, Voight would alternate between feature films and television movies, including a starring role in the 1993 miniseries Return to Lonesome Dove, a continuation of Larry McMurtry's western saga, 1989's Lonesome Dove. Voight played Captain Woodrow F. Call, the part played by Tommy Lee Jones in the original miniseries. Voight made a cameo appearance as himself on the Seinfeld episode "The Mom & Pop Store" airing November 17, 1994, in which George Costanza buys a car that appears to be owned by Jon Voight. Voight described the process leading up to the episode in an interview on the Red Carpet at the 2006 BAFTA Emmy Awards:

Well what happened was I was asked to be on Seinfeld. They said: "Would you do a Seinfeld?" And I said, and I just happened to know to see a few Seinfelds and I knew these guys were really tops; they were really, really clever guys, and I liked the show. And so I said "Sure!" and I thought they would ask me to do a walk-on, the way it came: "Would you come be part of the show?" And I said "Yeah, sure I'll do it." You know what I mean? Then I got the script and my name was on every page because it was about my car. And I laughed; it was hysterically funny. So I was really delighted to do it. The writer came up to me and he said "Jon, would you come take a look at my car to see if you ever owned it?", because the writer wrote it from a real experience where someone sold him the car based on the fact that it was my car. And I went down and I looked at the car and I said "No, I never had this car." So unfortunately I had to give him the bad news. But it was a funny episode.

In 1995, Voight played the role of "Nate", a sophisticated fence, in the crime drama film Heat, directed by Michael Mann, and appeared in the television films Convict Cowboy and The Tin Soldier, also directing the latter film. Voight next appeared in 1996's blockbuster film Mission: Impossible, directed by Brian De Palma and starring Tom Cruise. Voight played the role of spymaster James Phelps, a role originated by Peter Graves in the television series. In 1997, Voight appeared in six films, beginning with Rosewood, based on the 1923 destruction of the primarily black town of Rosewood, Florida, by the white residents of nearby Sumner. Voight played John Wright, a white Rosewood storeowner who follows his conscience and protects his black customers from the white rage. He next appeared in Anaconda, set in the Amazon; he played Paul Sarone, a snake hunter obsessed with a fabled giant anaconda, who hijacks an unwitting National Geographic film crew who are looking for a remote Indian tribe. Voight next appeared in a supporting role in Oliver Stone's U Turn, portraying a blind man. He took a supporting role in The Rainmaker, adopted from the John Grisham novel and directed by Francis Ford Coppola. He played an unscrupulous lawyer representing an insurance company, facing off with a neophyte lawyer played by Matt Damon. His last film of 1997 was Boys Will Be Boys, a family comedy directed by Dom DeLuise.

The following year, Voight had the lead role in the television film The Fixer, in which he played Jack Killoran, a lawyer who crosses ethical lines in order to "fix" things for his wealthy clients. A near-fatal accident awakens his dormant conscience and Killoran soon runs afoul of his former clients. He also took a substantial role in Tony Scott's 1998 political thriller, Enemy of the State, in which he played Will Smith's character's stalwart antagonist from the NSA. Voight was reunited with director Boorman in 1998's The General. Set in Dublin, Ireland, the film tells the true-life story of the charismatic leader of a gang of thieves, Martin Cahill, at odds with both the police and the Provisional IRA. Voight portrays Inspector Ned Kenny, determined to bring Cahill to justice. He next appeared in 1999's Varsity Blues. He played a blunt, autocratic football coach, pitted in a test of wills against his star player, portrayed by James Van Der Beek. Produced by fledgling MTV Pictures, the film became a surprise hit and helped connect Voight with a younger audience. Voight played Noah in the 1999 television production Noah's Ark, and appeared in Second String, also for TV. He also appeared with Cheryl Ladd in the feature A Dog of Flanders, a remake of a popular film set in Belgium.

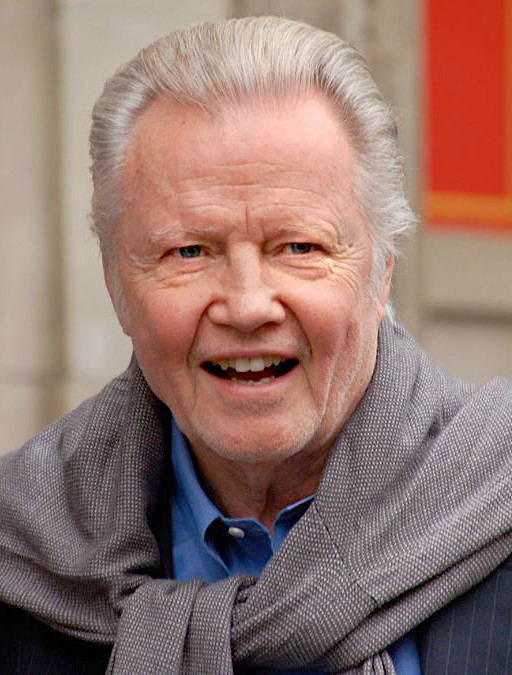
Voight in June 2013

Voight next portrayed President Franklin D. Roosevelt in 2001's action/war film Pearl Harbor, having accepted the role when Gene Hackman declined (his performance was received favorably by critics). Also that year, he appeared as Lord Croft, father of the title character of Lara Croft: Tomb Raider. Based on the popular video game, the digital adventuress was played on the big screen by Voight's own real-life daughter Angelina Jolie. That year, he also appeared in Zoolander, directed by Ben Stiller who starred as the title character, a vapid supermodel with humble roots. Voight appeared as Zoolander's coal-miner father. The film extracted both pathos and cruel humor from the scenes of Zoolander's return home, when he entered the mines alongside his father and brothers and Voight's character expressed his unspoken disgust at his son's chosen profession. Also in 2001, Voight joined Leelee Sobieski, Hank Azaria and David Schwimmer in the made-for-television film Uprising, which was based on the Warsaw Ghetto Uprising. Voight played Major-General Juergen Stroop, the German Nazi SS officer responsible for the destruction of the Jewish resistance, and received a Primetime Emmy Award nomination for Outstanding Supporting Actor in a Limited Series or Movie.

Director Michael Mann tagged Voight for a supporting role in the 2001 biopic Ali, which starred Will Smith as the controversial former heavyweight champ, Muhammad Ali. Voight was almost unrecognizable under his make-up and toupée, as he impersonated the sports broadcaster Howard Cosell. Voight received his fourth Academy Award nomination, this time for Best Actor in a Supporting Role, for his performance. Also in 2001, he appeared in the television mini-series Jack and the Beanstalk: The Real Story along with Vanessa Redgrave, Matthew Modine, Richard Attenborough, and Mia Sara. In 2003, he played the role of Marion Sevillo/Mr. Sir in Holes. In 2004, Voight joined Nicolas Cage, in National Treasure as Patrick Gates, the father of Cage's character. In 2005, he played the title role in the second part of CBS's miniseries Pope John Paul II.

In 2006, he was Kentucky Wildcats head coach Adolph Rupp in the Disney hit Glory Road. In 2007, he played United States Secretary of Defense John Keller in the summer blockbuster Transformers, reuniting him with Holes star Shia LaBeouf. Also in 2007, Voight reprised his role as Patrick Gates in National Treasure: Book of Secrets. He appeared in Bratz with his goddaughter Skyler Shaye. In 2008, he appeared as Creighton Kinkaid in the Christmas film Four Christmases. In 2009, Voight played Jonas Hodges, the American antagonist, in the seventh season of the hit Fox drama 24, a role that many argue is based on real life figures Alfried Krupp, Johann Rall and Erik Prince. Voight plays the chief executive officer of a fictional private military company based in northern Virginia called Starkwood, which has loose resemblances to Academi and ThyssenKrupp. Voight made his first appearance in the two-hour prequel episode 24: Redemption on November 23. He then went on to recur for 10 episodes of Season 7. He joined Dennis Haysbert as the only two actors ever to have been credited with the "Special Guest Appearance" card on 24.

That same year Voight also lent his voice talents in the Thomas Nelson audio Bible production known as The Word of Promise. In this dramatized audio, Voight played the character of Abraham. The project also featured a large ensemble of other well-known Hollywood actors including Jim Caviezel, Louis Gossett Jr., John Rhys-Davies, Luke Perry, Gary Sinise, Jason Alexander, Christopher McDonald, Marisa Tomei and John Schneider.

=== 2013–present: Later career ===
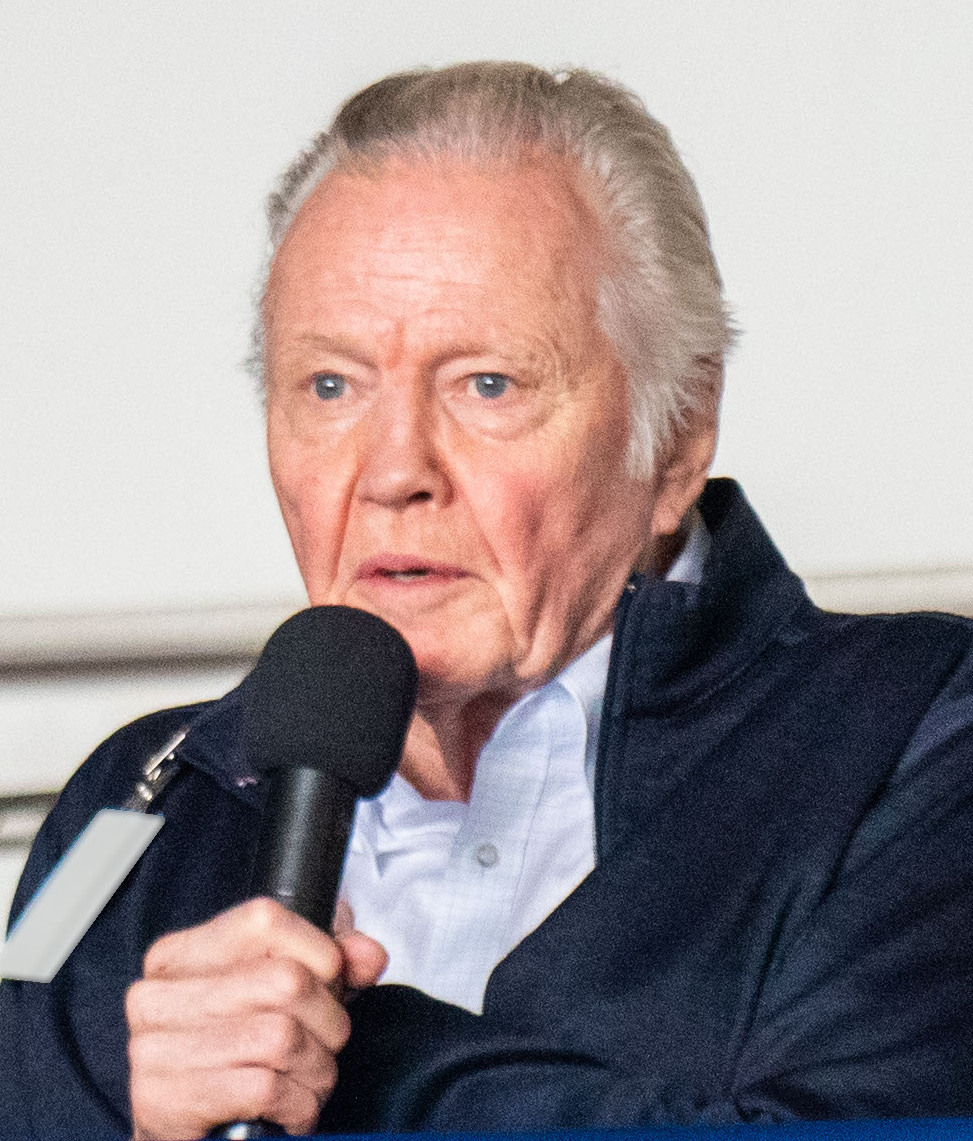
Voight at the USS Ronald Reagan in 2024

In 2013, Voight made his much-acclaimed appearance on crime drama Ray Donovan as Mickey Donovan, the main character's conniving father. The role earned him a Golden Globe Award for Best Supporting Actor – Series, Miniseries or Television Film in 2014 as well as nominations for two Primetime Emmy Award for Outstanding Supporting Actor in a Drama Series. He reprised his role in the 2022 film Ray Donovan: The Movie. He played Henry Shaw Sr. in Fantastic Beasts and Where to Find Them (2016). The following year he acted in the Christian drama Same Kind of Different as Me alongside Greg Kinnear and Renée Zellweger. He portrayed Supreme Court Justice Warren E. Burger in the film Roe v. Wade (2020). In 2022 he participated in the documentary film Desperate Souls, Dark City and the Legend of Midnight Cowboy with Bob Balaban, Brian De Palma and Brenda Vaccaro. It premiered at the 79th Venice International Film Festival and was later shortlisted for the Academy Award for Best Documentary Feature at the 96th Academy Awards. In 2022, Voight was cast in the science fiction epic Megalopolis, directed by Francis Ford Coppola. In Reagan Voight was cast as Viktor Ivanov, a former KGB agent. The film, starring Dennis Quaid as Ronald Reagan, was theatrically released in the United States in 2024.

In the 2026 Bryan Singer-directed film Monument, Voight starred as the Israeli architect Yaakov Rechter alongside Joseph Mazzello (who played his son).

== Political views and positions ==
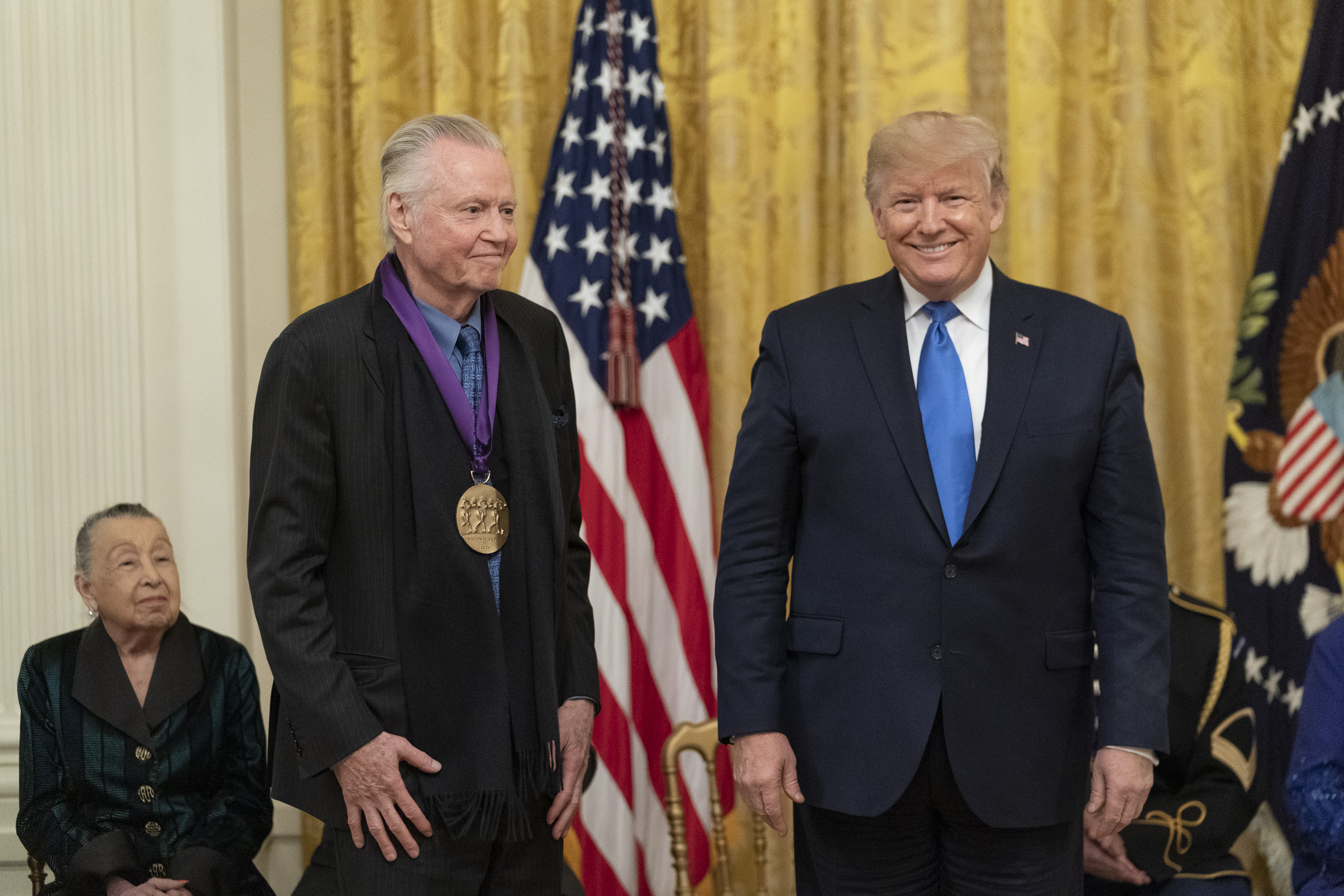
Voight with President Donald Trump after receiving the National Medal of Arts in 2019

In his early life, Voight's political views aligned with American liberal views, and he supported President John F. Kennedy, describing his assassination as traumatizing to people at that time. He also worked alongside Jane Fonda, Tina Sinatra, and Cicely Tyson for the George McGovern campaign, assisting with voter registration efforts in the inner city areas of Los Angeles. Voight actively protested against the Vietnam War. In the 1970s, he made public appearances alongside Jane Fonda and Leonard Bernstein in support of the leftist Popular Unity group in Chile.

In a July 28, 2008, op-ed in The Washington Times, Voight wrote that he regretted his youthful anti-war activism, and claimed that the peace movement of that time was driven by "Marxist propaganda". He also claimed that the radicals in the peace movement were responsible for the communists coming to power in Vietnam and Cambodia and for failing to stop the subsequent slaughter of 1.5 million people in the Killing Fields.

In the same op-ed, Voight also criticized the Democratic Party and Barack Obama's bid to become president, saying that the Democrats had created "a propaganda campaign with subliminal messages, creating a God-like figure [Obama]" who would "demoralize this country and help create a socialist America." He said Obama had grown up with the teachings of very angry, militant white and black people around him.

Voight endorsed Republican presidential nominees Mitt Romney and Donald Trump in the 2012 and 2016 presidential elections respectively. Speaking at an inauguration rally for Trump in January 2017, Voight said, "God answered all our prayers" by granting Trump the White House. In May 2019, Voight released a short two-part video on Twitter supporting Trump's policies, and calling him "the greatest president since Abraham Lincoln."

In November 2020, after the United States presidential election, Voight released a statement through his Twitter account, in which he stated he was very angry that Joe Biden had won the election. He further implied that Biden had committed electoral fraud and proclaimed that the United States was engaged in "our greatest fight since the Civil War – the battle of righteousness versus Satan, because these leftists are evil, corrupt, and they want to tear down this nation." He finished the statement by imploring his followers to not let the 2020 presidential election be certified without attempting to make sure it was accurate first. After the January 6 United States Capitol attack, and after Biden's victory was confirmed in Congress on January 7, Voight released one more video on his Twitter account for his followers, telling them to cease protesting.

In 2022, following a mass shooting at an elementary school in Uvalde, Texas, Voight posted a video in support of gun control, arguing that "proper qualifications" and "testing" should be necessary for gun ownership.

In November 2023, Voight expressed disappointment in his daughter Angelina Jolie, criticizing her views on the Gaza war and accusing her of spreading misinformation. Whereas Jolie had called for a ceasefire, Voight emphasized Israel's right to protect its people, stating that the conflict was about preserving the Holy Land and the Jewish people. Voight reiterated his opinions about Jolie's views on Israel and the Gaza war in a July 2024 Variety cover story, although he shared that he continues to have a relationship with her and his grandchildren. Voight again endorsed Donald Trump's candidacy for president in 2024.

After Zohran Mamdani’s victory in the 2025 New York City Mayoral Election, Voight called him a “communist” and demanded Trump "terminate" Mamdani's election.

=== Kennedy Center trustee; Special Ambassador to Hollywood ===
On March 26, 2019, Voight was appointed to a six-year term on the Board of Trustees of the Kennedy Center in Washington DC.

On January 16, 2025, president-elect Donald Trump announced that Voight would serve in a new role as a Special Ambassador to Hollywood, sharing the role with fellow actors Mel Gibson and Sylvester Stallone, with the latter rejecting the appointment. Trump stated that he wants these actors to make Hollywood "stronger than ever before" by bringing back business lost to "foreign countries". According to Deadline, by May 2025, Voight had held meetings with both Hollywood unions and executives on issues with domestic film production. Stallone and Gibson were not involved and have not held similar talks of their own.

== Personal life ==
In 1962, Voight married actress Lauri Peters, whom he met when they both appeared in the original Broadway production of The Sound of Music. They divorced in 1967. He married actress Marcheline Bertrand in 1971. They separated in 1976, filed for divorce in 1978, and finalized it in 1980. Their children, James Haven (born 1973) and Angelina Jolie (born 1975), went on to enter the film business as actors and producers. Through Jolie, he has six grandchildren.

Voight has not remarried since the divorce from his second wife. Over the decades, he has dated Linda Morand, Rebecca De Mornay, Eileen Davidson, Barbra Streisand, Nastassja Kinski, and Diana Ross.

Voight is a Kentucky Colonel.

== Acting credits and accolades ==
Over his career Voight has received several accolades, including an Academy Award, a BAFTA Award, and four Golden Globe Awards as well as nominations for four Primetime Emmy Awards and a Screen Actors Guild Award. In 2019 he was awarded with the National Medal of Arts.

== See also ==
- List of actors with Academy Award nominations
- List of actors with two or more Academy Award nominations in acting categories
- List of Golden Globe winners
