= Wally George =

American television and radio commentator (1931–2003)

- Born: Walter George Pearch, Jr. December 4, 1931; Oakland, California, U.S.
- Died: October 5, 2003 (aged 71); Fountain Valley, California, U.S.
- Resting place: Forest Lawn Memorial Park, Hollywood Hills, Los Angeles, CA
- Occupations: Talk show host, radio commentator
- Years active: 1946–2003
- Children: 6, including Rebecca De Mornay

Wally George (born Walter George Pearch, Jr.; December 4, 1931 – October 5, 2003) was an American conservative radio and television commentator. Calling himself the "Father of Combat TV," he was a fixture on Southern California television for three decades (1975–2003), most notably as the host of Hot Seat, which began as a local show on KDOC Channel 56, a local Southern California based UHF (public access) TV station in Anaheim, Orange County in 1983. His other nicknames were "Mr. Conservative" and "Mr. America" in the 1980s–1990s and he represented the strong conservative fan base of Orange County and the Coachella Valley of California where he was also on their local TV stations.

== Early life ==
George was born Walter George Pearch, Jr. in Oakland, California. His father, Walter George Pearch, worked in the marine shipping industry. His mother, Eugenia Clinchard, had been a vaudeville performer and child movie actress, in Essanay Studios westerns starring Broncho Billy Anderson. George grew up in San Mateo and was 13 when his parents divorced, after which his mother moved to the Hollywood Hills in Los Angeles. He was educated at the Hollywood Professional School.

== Career ==
By age 16, George was working as a disc-jockey at AM radio station KIEV in Glendale, California, followed by work at other stations in Los Angeles, Santa Rosa and Guam.

George also authored entertainment-oriented columns for the Los Angeles Times and the Evening Vanguard/Star News. In 1968, he launched The Wally George Show on FM radio station KTYM in Inglewood, California. In 1975, he became producer and co-host of The Sam Yorty Show on Los Angeles television station KCOP with his political mentor Sam Yorty, the former mayor of Los Angeles. By 1980, George had his own talk show at KWHY, and when it moved to fledgling UHF station KDOC in Anaheim, he launched Hot Seat in 1983.

George was known for his combative, almost farcical interview style and shocking antics on Hot Seat where he would yell at people and pontificate on his borderline nationalistic views. Wally let people know what he was about. He played to an eager studio audience and often ejected guests from the set, using uniformed private security guards. Hanging behind him were pictures of John Wayne and the U.S. Space Shuttle, both with strong links to Orange County, California, where the episodes were taped. He staunchly supported then-president Ronald Reagan, and his show was sponsored mostly by local Orange County businesses. George's gray slacks, navy blue blazer, white dress shirt and U.S. flag tie along with his platinum blond wig—combed straight down at ear-length and parted on the side—became a conservative style trademark. He called his delivery "combat TV," a phrase he used in his 1999 autobiography. Johnny Carson labeled George "the William F. Buckley of the cockfighting set."

Hot Seat, in turn, became known for its provocative guest appearances. A 1983 appearance by Blase Bonpane ended when Bonpane overturned George's desk and walked out of the studio. When similar incidents occurred on later talk shows, such as those hosted by Geraldo Rivera and Jerry Springer, George called them "copycat combat." However, many claimed that the stunts on Hot Seat were staged, and that some guests were hired to be controversial and disruptive. Wally also hosted an afternoon live television call in show, where he would read a prepared daily commentary, and then take live phone calls on the air. The overwhelming majority of these calls were prank phone calls.

In late 1992, financial troubles at KDOC led to the closure of the production studio where Hot Seat was filmed and he stopped filming debates in front of a studio audience. He carried on hosting rerun segments until June 2003.

George hosted a few short-lived television variety shows. In 1965, he hosted the Wally George Showpeople's Show on KTTV. In 1970, he hosted Wally's World on KHJ-TV. In 1976, he hosted Wally George's Hollywood Showcase on KCOP-TV.

George released a four track 12" (30 cm) EP entitled Wal-ly! Wal-ly! (drawn from the rallying cry of his Hot Seat studio audience) on Rhino Records in 1984.

George played himself in the films Grunt! The Wrestling Movie (1985), A Nightmare on Elm Street 5: The Dream Child (1989), Repossessed (1990) and Club Fed (1990). He played a Porsche salesman in the movie Squanderers (1996).

He gave halftime "studio analysis" and sometimes "endgame news" on the roller derby television program RollerGames which aired in 1989-90 and later on the Nintendo Entertainment System game of the same name. He also appeared on The People's Court program after being sued by an attorney who had been on Hot Seat. E! True Hollywood Story ran a feature on Wally George in 2000.

== Personal life ==
George was married multiple times (potentially ten times) and had at least six children. His first marriage was to Lillian Kamminga in 1954. They had a daughter and son, Debtralynne Salas (also known as Debbie Duenas) and Walter George Pearch III. His marriage to Jane Eagar produced actress Rebecca De Mornay (born 1959). In 1992, George threatened to sue De Mornay for calling him a bigamist in the National Enquirer.

In 1961, he married Joan Marie Teipe. Around 1964, he married Nancy Marie Freely and they had a son, Kerry Walter George. He married Linda Yvonne Lowell in 1968, and they had a daughter, Kimberley Jennifer. In 1988, George married Janis Hedges, and they had a daughter, Holly Janis George.

He was a longtime Sherman Oaks, California, resident. In later life, George lived in Garden Grove, California.

== Death ==
Following years of worsening health, George died of pneumonia at Fountain Valley Hospital on October 5, 2003. His memorial service was held at the Crystal Cathedral in Garden Grove, California, where he was eulogized by evangelist Robert H. Schuller. He is interred at Forest Lawn Cemetery in Hollywood Hills, California.
