= Office of the Americas =

U.S. non-profit organization

Office of the Americas logo

The Office of the Americas is a non-profit organization based in Los Angeles, California, and founded in April 1983 by Theresa Bonpane, who along with her husband, Blase, were the Director and Founding Director, respectively, of the organization. The OOA is dedicated to furthering the cause of justice and peace through broad-based educational programs, and is a recognized source of documentation and analysis of current international events with a focus on the foreign policy of the United States.

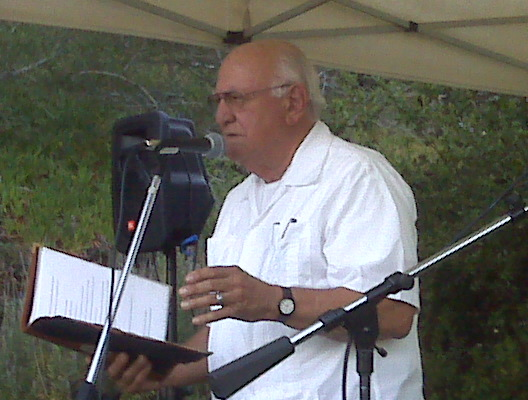
Blase Bonpane speaking at Progressive Democrats event

For more than 50 years, Bonpane broadcast the weekly World Focus. In June 2018, he announced that the program had come to an end. Sundays from 10:00 am to 11:00 am on Pacifica Radio's KPFK out of Los Angeles.

Blase Bonpane authored many books, based on his radio commentaries, and his experiences as a former priest working in Latin America. Blase' autobiography, Imagine No Religion, was published by Red Hen Press in 2011. In 2015, he published a book of commentaries about Pope Francis' 2nd Encyclical, laudato si (Praise be to you): On the Care of our Common Home. His most recent publication is The Nicene Heresy - Christendom and War - Reverence and Critique.

Programs of the Office of the Americas include:

- Offering information and commentary to mainstream and independent media as well as to scholarly publications
- TV and radio commentaries, including World Focus, a weekly broadcast on Pacifica Radio
- Press conferences and background briefings
- Assisting in documentary, feature film and TV productions
- Publishing "Blase Bonpane Reports", a weekly e-newsletter
- Lecturing at universities and peace and justice groups nationally
- Providing information on legislative issues
- Providing services and networking with other peace and justice organizations

== Sources ==
- National Catholic Reporter, November 22, 2002: "Peace Group Lauds Activists"
- Los Angeles Times, April 2006: "Speaking Their Peace: Stoked by a Spiritual Fire That Grew Into Political Activism, Blase and Theresa Bonpane Have Dedicated Their Lives to Justice for the Poor" (archived)
- Los Angeles Times, December 1997: "Vigil Held for Woman Imprisoned in Peru" (archived)
- Los Angeles Times, June 1996: "Peace Day Aims at Teaching Students How to Avoid Violence" (archived)
