= Never Talk to Strangers =

- Theatrical release poster
- Directed by: Peter Hall
- Written by: Lewis Green; Jordan Rush
- Produced by: Andras Hamori; Jeffrey R. Neuman; Martin J. Wiley
- Starring: Rebecca De Mornay; Antonio Banderas; Dennis Miller; Len Cariou; Harry Dean Stanton
- Cinematography: Elemér Ragályi
- Edited by: Roberto Silvi
- Music by: Pino Donaggio
- Production company: Alliance Communications
- Distributed by: TriStar Pictures (Select territories); Alliance Releasing (Canada)
- Release date: October 20, 1995
- Running time: 86 minutes
- Countries: United States; Canada; Germany
- Language: English
- Budget: $6.4 million
- Box office: $6,858,261

Never Talk to Strangers is a 1995 psychological erotic thriller film directed by Peter Hall and starring Antonio Banderas and Rebecca De Mornay.

Never Talk to Strangers was released by TriStar Pictures in select territories and by Alliance Releasing in Canada on October 20, 1995. The film received negative reviews from critics and grossed $6,858,261 against a $6.4 million budget.

== Plot ==
Psychologist Dr. Sarah Taylor is a guarded, aloof criminal psychologist who interviews a client who is a rapist, and is pleading not guilty by reason of insanity. It is later revealed that she was the subject of daily rapes as a child by her estranged father, who is now shown to be very ill. Sarah meets Tony Ramirez in a shopping mall, and she gives him her number. She begins a relationship with Tony, despite the creepy advances of her neighbor, Cliff, with whom she once had a one-night stand.

Days into this new relationship, Sarah begins to get death threats and strange gifts, such as dead flowers. As she gets more romantic with Tony, the gifts get more extreme. Her cat is dismembered which leads to Sarah going to the police. Sarah then hires a detective and has Tony followed, and breaks into his apartment only to discover that he has a file on her, including information about her mother's death in a gun accident, twenty years before. Tony is actually investigating her, trying to learn the whereabouts of a former boyfriend of hers who had disappeared suddenly.

Ultimately, it is revealed that Sarah suffers from multiple personality disorder, brought on from her abuse as a child, and from her father brainwashing her to cover up the murder of her mother. Her alternate personality is responsible for all of the strange gifts, and for murdering her ex-boyfriend. When Tony goes to her father's house, Sarah (under the control of her alternate personality) follows him, shoots and kills him there, and then kills her father when he tries to intervene. When Sarah reverts to her normal personality, not remembering what has happened, she presumes that Tony was insane and killed her father, and that she killed Tony in self-defense. In the end, she is seen entering into a relationship with Cliff.

== Cast ==
- Rebecca De Mornay as Dr. Sarah Taylor
- Antonio Banderas as Tony Ramirez
- Dennis Miller as Cliff Raddison
- Len Cariou as Henry Taylor
- Harry Dean Stanton as Max Cheski
- Eugene Lipinski as Dudakoff
- Martha Burns as Maura
- Beau Starr as Grogan
- Phillip Jarrett as Spatz
- Tim Kelleher as Wabash

== Reception ==
Never Talk to Strangers received negative reviews. On review aggregator website Rotten Tomatoes, the film has a score of 19% based on 21 reviews, with an average rating of 3.60/10. The site's consensus reads: "Never Talk to Strangers -- and never make the mistake of believing this silly stalker mystery is the best available viewing option". Audiences polled by CinemaScore gave the film an average grade of "C+" on an A+ to F scale.

Brendan Kelly of Variety wrote: "Never Talk to Strangers is a reasonably entertaining but largely uninspired erotic thriller that's too much a chip off the Fatal Attraction block. The promise of high-impact bedroom aerobics will generate some interest, but the fully clothed drama isn't nearly as enthralling as the steamy scenes, so the pic isn't likely to maintain much [Box Office] ardor." Peter Stack of the San Francisco Chronicle called the film "mysterious and sexy", adding that it is "enough to keep tension alive until, too bad, the whole thing collapses with a twist ending that is nearly laughable". Caryn James of The New York Times called the film's ending "idiotic" and wrote that Peter Hall, the director, "is obviously more at home with Shakespeare than with this material".

Hal Hinson of The Washington Post praised the director of the film, calling him "legendary", while Time Out called it an "adequate psychological thriller on a topical theme".

== Soundtrack ==
The film features "Love Sick" performed by Alfonzo Blackwell.
