= Jerzy Kluger =

Polish Jewish businessman

- Born: 4 April 1921; Kraków, Poland
- Died: 31 December 2011 (aged 90); Rome, Italy
- Occupation: Jewish businessman

Jerzy Kluger (4 April 1921 – 31 December 2011) was a Polish Jewish businessman who lived in Rome. He was born in 1921 in Kraków and raised in Wadowice where, as a small boy, he met and became a personal friend of Karol Wojtyła, later Archbishop of Kraków and eventually Pope John Paul II.

== Early life ==
Jerzy Kluger was born in Kraków, Poland on 4 April 1921 and was raised in Wadowice. His father, Wilhelm, was a lawyer. The Klugers were members of the Jewish community of Wadowice, of which Wilhelm was president, but he nonetheless insisted that his family mix Jewish and secular identities. Hence, the family spoke Polish as opposed to Yiddish, and Jerzy and his siblings attended public schools as opposed to religious ones. The Jewish community of Wadowice had good relations with their Catholic neighbors, though anti-Semitism was not uncommon.

Kluger, who was called Jurek as a boy, met John Paul, then Karol Wojtyła and nicknamed Lolek, before they were five. They skied, hiked and played sports together; young Karol played goalie on Wadowice’s Jewish soccer team. They helped each other with homework, made devilish fun of teachers and visited each other’s homes almost daily. Karol Wojtyla enjoyed listening to Wilhelm’s string quartet, composed of two Catholics and two Jews. Kluger loved to hear his friend’s father tell tales of Polish kings and castles in front of his coal-fired stove. He did not love his grandmother’s repeated question: "Why can’t you be more like Lolek?" One incident left a profound impact on Kluger: After learning that both boys had passed their high school exams, he ran to the church, where he knew he would find his friend, to share the news. Another parishioner recognized Kluger as a Jew and asked why he had come there. When Wojtyla heard about the exchange, he responded, "Aren’t we all God’s children?"

== World War II military service ==
After the Germans invaded, Jerzy and his father sought to join the retreating Polish Army, finally catching up with the Polish troops and enlisting in Russia. His father was sent to Palestine; Jerzy was sent to Cairo, then Iraq and finally the front in Italy to fight. His sister and mother, who refused to leave his ailing grandmother, were taken away by Nazi soldiers. His grandmother was put on a train to Belzec extermination camp, where she was murdered.. His mother and sister were murdered in Auschwitz.

While fighting with the Polish army in Africa, Kluger met his future wife, Irene White, who was a driver for the British army. They were married in Egypt before Kluger fought at Monte Cassino, a key battle in the Italian campaign, in 1944. After the war, Kluger earned an Engineering degree from the University of Nottingham and worked in that field before moving to Rome in the 1950s.

== After the Second Vatican Council ==
During the Second Vatican Council, Kluger met Wojtyla again for the first time after their youth.

In 2000, Kluger accompanied Wojtyla in an official visit to the Holocaust Museum of Jerusalem.

In May 2005, he was interviewed in Cracovia by the Italian journalist Enzo Biagi, together with the cardinal Franciszek Macharski, Maria Nowak, his deskmate at the Liceo classico Stanislav Jura, Father Hieczyslaw Malinski who studied as a seminarist with the future Pope.

The long-time friendship among "Lolek e Jurek" was narrowed in the book Letter to a Jewish Friend, published in 1993 by Gianfranco Svidercoschi. In his book A Life With Karol, the former Cardinal of Cracovia Stanislaw Dziwisz wrote that Wojtyla was used to invite for launch or for dinner his former deskmate Kluger with his family.

== Family ==
Predeceased by his daughter, Lesley Kluger, who died in 2011, Kluger was survived by his widow; a second daughter, Linda (who died in 2015); and a grandchild.

== Death ==
Kluger died on the New Year's Eve of 2011 in Rome of Alzheimer's disease, aged 90.

== Portrayal in film ==
Kluger was the inspiration for the character of "Roman" in 2005's TV miniseries based on the life of Pope John Paul II. He was portrayed by Italian actor Daniele Pecci.

== Literature ==
- Dowling, Gregory. Letter to a Jewish Friend - Jerzy Kluger. Hodder & Stoughton Religious, 1994, ISBN 0-340-61014-X, Jerzy Kluger (author), Pope John Paul II (author), Gian Franco Svidercoschi (editor)
- O'Brien, Darcy. The Hidden Pope - The Untold Story of a Lifelong Friendship That Is Challenging the Relationship between Catholics and Jews. The Personal Journey of John Paul II and Jerzy Kluger, Daybreak Books, New York, 1998. ISBN 0-87596-478-8
