= List of awards and nominations received by Jon Voight =

Jon Voight awards and nominations
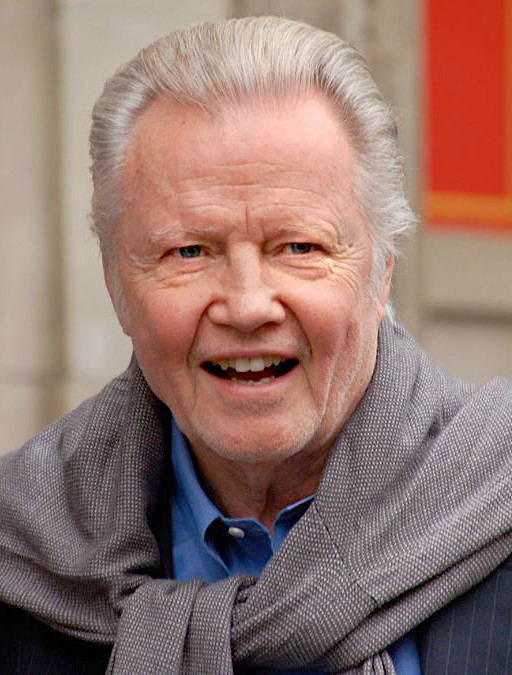
- Voight in 2013
Awards and nominations
Award	Wins	Nominations
Academy Awards	1	4
BAFTA Awards	1	1
Emmy Awards	0	4
Golden Globes	4	11
SAG Awards	0	1

Totals (Note: Certain award groups do not simply award one winner. They acknowledge several different recipients, have runners-up, and have third place. Since this is a specific recognition and is different from losing an award, runner-up mentions are considered wins in this award tally. For simplification and to avoid errors, each award in this list has been presumed to have had a prior nomination.)
- Wins: 30
- Nominations: 96

Jon Voight is an American actor known for his roles on stage and screen. He received numerous accolades including an Academy Award, a BAFTA Award, and four Golden Globe Awards as well as nominations for four Primetime Emmy Awards and a Screen Actors Guild Award.

Voight won the Academy Award for Best Actor for his portrayal of a paraplegic Vietnam veteran in Coming Home (1978). His was Oscar-nominated for playing Joe Buck, a gigolo, in Midnight Cowboy (1969), a ruthless bank robber Oscar "Manny" Manheim in Runaway Train (1985) and as sportscaster Howard Cosell in Ali (2001). He won the BAFTA Award for Most Promising Newcomer to Leading Film Roles and the Golden Globe Award for New Star of the Year – Actor. He also received three Golden Globe Awards for Coming Home, Runaway Train and Ray Donovan (2014).

For his roles in television he received four Primetime Emmy Awards nominations for his performances as Major General Jürgen Stroop in the NBC war drama film Uprising (2001), the title role in the CBS miniseries Pope John Paul II (2005), and Michael "Mickey" Donovan in the Showtime crime series Ray Donovan (2013–2020). For his performance as Eddie in the religious drama The Five People You Meet in Heaven (2005) he received a nomination for the Screen Actors Guild Award for Outstanding Performance by a Male Actor in a Miniseries or Television Movie.

== Major awards ==
=== Academy Awards ===
Year	Category	Nominated work	Result	Ref.
1970	Best Actor	Midnight Cowboy	Nominated	
1979	Best Actor	Coming Home	Won	
1986	Best Actor	Runaway Train	Nominated	
2002	Best Supporting Actor	Ali	Nominated	

=== BAFTA Awards ===
Year	Category	Nominated work	Result	Ref.
British Academy Film Awards
1969	Most Promising Newcomer to Leading Film Roles	Midnight Cowboy	Won	

=== Critics' Choice Awards ===
Year	Category	Nominated work	Result	Ref.
Critics' Choice Movie Awards
2001	Best Supporting Actor	Ali	Nominated	
Critics' Choice Television Awards
2014	Best Supporting Actor in a Drama Series	Ray Donovan	Nominated	
2016	Best Supporting Actor in a Drama Series	Ray Donovan	Nominated	

=== Emmy Awards ===
Year	Category	Nominated work	Result	Ref.
Primetime Emmy Awards
2002	Outstanding Supporting Actor in a Miniseries or a Movie	Uprising	Nominated	
2006	Outstanding Lead Actor in a Miniseries or a Movie	Pope John Paul II	Nominated	
2014	Outstanding Supporting Actor in a Drama Series	Ray Donovan (episode: "Fite Nite")	Nominated	
2016	Outstanding Supporting Actor in a Drama Series	Ray Donovan (episode: "The Kalamazoo")	Nominated	

=== Golden Globe Awards ===
Year	Category	Nominated work	Result	Ref.
1970	Most Promising Newcomer – Male		Won	
1970	Best Actor in a Motion Picture – Drama	Midnight Cowboy	Nominated	
1973	Best Actor in a Motion Picture – Drama	Deliverance	Nominated	
1979	Best Actor in a Motion Picture – Drama	Coming Home	Won	
1980	Best Actor in a Motion Picture – Drama	The Champ	Nominated	
1986	Best Actor in a Motion Picture – Drama	Runaway Train	Won	
1993	Best Actor – Miniseries or Television Movie	The Last of His Tribe	Nominated	
1998	Best Supporting Actor – Motion Picture	The Rainmaker	Nominated	
2002	Best Supporting Actor – Motion Picture	Ali	Nominated	
2014	Best Supporting Actor – Television	Ray Donovan (season 1)	Won	
2015	Best Supporting Actor – Television	Ray Donovan (season 2)	Nominated	

=== Screen Actors Guild Awards ===
Year	Category	Nominated work	Result	Ref.
2005	Outstanding Actor in a Miniseries or Television Movie	The Five People You Meet in Heaven	Nominated	

== Critics awards ==
Award	Year	Category	Nominated work	Result	Ref.
Chicago Film Critics Association	2001	Best Supporting Actor	Ali	Nominated	
Dallas-Fort Worth Film Critics Association	2001	Best Supporting Actor	Ali	Nominated	
Los Angeles Film Critics Association	1978	Best Actor	Coming Home	Won	
National Board of Review	1978	Best Actor	Coming Home	Won (Note: Tied with Laurence Olivier for The Boys from Brazil.)	
National Board of Review	2001	Career Achievement Award	—N/a	Won	
National Society of Film Critics	1969	Best Actor	Midnight Cowboy	Won	
National Society of Film Critics	1978	Best Actor	Coming Home	2nd Place	
New York Film Critics Circle	1969	Best Actor	Midnight Cowboy	Won	
New York Film Critics Circle	1978	Best Actor	Coming Home	Won	

== Miscellaneous awards ==
Award	Year	Category	Nominated work	Result	Ref.
Beverly Hills Film Festival	2011	Parajanov-Vartanov Institute Award	—N/a	Won	
Blockbuster Entertainment Awards	1998	Favorite Villain	Enemy of the State	Nominated	
Boston Film Festival	2016	Best Ensemble Cast	American Wrestler: The Wizard	Won	
CableACE Awards	1993	Actor in a Movie or Miniseries	The Last of His Tribe	Won	
CableACE Awards	1995	Children's Special – 7 and Older	The Tin Soldier	Nominated	
Cannes Film Festival	1978	Best Actor	Coming Home	Won	
CineVegas	2009	Marquee Award	—N/a	Won	
Giffoni Film Festival	1995	François Truffaut Award	—N/a	Won	
Gold Derby Awards	2005	TV Movie/Mini Lead Actor	The Five People You Meet in Heaven	Nominated	
Golden Raspberry Awards	1997	Worst Actor	Anaconda	Nominated	
Golden Raspberry Awards	1997	Worst Supporting Actor	Most Wanted and U Turn	Nominated	
Golden Raspberry Awards	1997	Worst Screen Couple	Anaconda	Nominated	
Golden Raspberry Awards	2004	Worst Supporting Actor	Superbabies: Baby Geniuses 2	Nominated	
Golden Raspberry Awards	2007	Worst Supporting Actor	Bratz, National Treasure: Book of Secrets; September Dawn, and Transformers	Nominated	
Golden Raspberry Awards	2023	Worst Actor	Mercy	Won	
Golden Raspberry Awards	2024	Worst Supporting Actor	Megalopolis, Reagan, Shadow Land, and Strangers	Won	
Golden Raspberry Awards	2024	Worst Screen Combo (Note: Nominated under "The entire cast of Megalopolis")	Megalopolis	Nominated	
Laurel Awards	1969	Male New Face	Midnight Cowboy	Won	
Movieguide Awards	2016	Best Actor	Woodlawn	Nominated	
NAACP Image Awards	1975	Outstanding Actor in a Motion Picture	Conrack	Nominated	
Online Film & Television Association	2006	Best Actor in a Motion Picture or Miniseries	Pope John Paul II	Nominated	
Polish Film Festival (Los Angeles)	2015	Pola Negri Award	Pope John Paul II	Won	
Satellite Awards	2013	Best Supporting Actor – Television	Ray Donovan	Nominated	
ShoWest Convention	1979	Male Star of the Year	—N/a	Won	
Stinkers Bad Movie Awards	1997	Worst Supporting Actor	Anaconda	Won	
Stinkers Bad Movie Awards	1997	Most Annoying Fake Accent	Anaconda and Most Wanted	Won	
Stinkers Bad Movie Awards	2004	Worst Supporting Actor	Superbabies: Baby Geniuses 2	Nominated	
Stinkers Bad Movie Awards	2004	Worst Fake Accent – Male	Superbabies: Baby Geniuses 2	Nominated	
Theatre World Awards	1967	Distinguished Performance	That Summer - That Fall	Won	
Vienna Independent Film Festival	2020	Best Supporting Actor	Roe v. Wade	Won	
Western Heritage Awards	1994	Television Feature Film	Return to Lonesome Dove	Won	
