= Nuclear Age Peace Foundation =

International non-profit organization

- Formation: 1982
- Founders: David Krieger
- Legal status: 501(c)3
- Official language: English
- President: Ivana N. Hughes
- Website: www.wagingpeace.org

The Nuclear Age Peace Foundation (NAPF) is a non-profit, non-partisan international education and advocacy organization. Founded in 1982, NAPF is composed of individuals and organizations from all over the world. It has consultative status to the United Nations Economic and Social Council and is recognized by the UN as a Peace Messenger Organization.

== About ==
NAPF's mission is to "educate, advocate, and inspire action for a just and peaceful world, free of nuclear weapons." Its vision is "Pursuing and achieving a just and peaceful world, free of nuclear weapons."

NAPF engages in advocacy and education programs. Its educational projects include the Sunflower e-newsletter, which provides monthly information and analysis of nuclear and international security issues, and its Nuclear Files, which chronicles the history of nuclear weapons. NAPF works with elected officials and decision-makers around the world to advocate for nuclear weapons abolition.

== Nuclear Zero ==
In 2014, the Nuclear Age Peace Foundation consulted with the Marshall Islands when it filed cases against the nine nuclear-armed countries (United States, United Kingdom, France, Russia, China, Israel, India, Pakistan, North Korea) in the International Court of Justice and U.S. Federal District Court. The lawsuits make the central claim that these nations have failed to comply with their obligations under international law to pursue negotiations aimed at the complete elimination of their nuclear weapons.

Five of the nuclear-armed countries are parties to the Nuclear Non-Proliferation Treaty (NPT). Article VI of the NPT requires that parties "pursue negotiations in good faith" aimed at "complete disarmament." The lawsuits contend that the other four countries, while not bound to the NPT, are obligated by customary international law to pursue nuclear disarmament.

Presenting evidence that all nine nuclear-armed countries continue to update and enhance their nuclear arsenals while failing to take disarmament negotiations seriously, the lawsuits allege that each nuclear-armed country is in breach of its international obligations. The case filed in the U.S. Federal District Court is particularly historic, as it is the first time that the U.S. has been charged in domestic court for violation of an international disarmament treaty. The U.S. government has filed an official "notice of appearance" and has named a legal team to defend it in court.

== Advisory Council ==
Members of NAPF's Advisory Council help spread the organization's message worldwide. Members of the Advisory Council include:

- Hafsat Abiola
- Tadatoshi Akiba
- Rabbi Leonard Beerman
- Harry Belafonte
- Blase Bonpane
- Helen Caldicott
- Noam Chomsky
- Jean-Michel Cousteau
- Tony de Brum
- Michael Douglas
- Riane Eisler
- Jane Goodall
- The 14th Dalai Lama
- Queen Noor of Jordan
- Ted Turner
- Archbishop Desmond Tutu

== See also ==
- Anti-nuclear movement
- Council for a Livable World
- Center for Arms Control and Non-Proliferation
