= Hot Seat (talk show) =

- Also known as: The Wally George Show
- Genre: Talk show
- Created by: Michael Volpe
- Directed by: Jeff Bingham; Brian Lockwood
- Presented by: Wally George
- Theme music composer: Craig Palmer (1984 theme); John Coleman (1984–1992 theme)
- Opening theme: Eyewitness News (1984 theme); World in Action (1984–1992 theme)
- Country of origin: United States
- Original language: English
- No. of episodes: approx. 490

Production
- Executive producer: Wally George
- Production locations: KDOC-TV Studios; Anaheim, California
- Running time: 50 minutes (without commercials)
- Production company: Wally George Productions

Original release
- Network: KDOC-TV
- Release: July 16, 1983 – June 2003

Hot Seat was a Saturday late night syndicated, politically oriented, though often satirical and comedic television talk-show that began in the early 1980s, hosted by conservative commentator Wally George. It was shot in the studios of KDOC, a UHF television station licensed to (and, at the time, having their studios) in Anaheim, California. The first edition of the series aired on Saturday July 16, 1983.

== Overview ==
George hosted the show sitting behind a desk and wearing a red, white, and blue necktie, and his completely white hair in a curious comb over. Behind him was a flag of the United States and a photo of a Space Shuttle launching with the caption that read, "USA Is #1."

Each episode was videotaped before a live audience on Wednesday night at approximately 6:15 p.m., as stated on the show by Wally himself. The tape was then reviewed by the production staff and network, before it could be edited and finalized for air three days later on Saturday night.

Originally only seen locally, the show gained national attention on the November 5, 1983 episode, when a self-proclaimed pacifist named Blase Bonpane, who was discussing his opposition of the U.S. invasion of Grenada, suddenly erupted in anger over George's taunts, flipped over the host's desk and stormed off the show. A clip of the altercation aired on national news programs, and attracted attention from program directors at TV stations nationwide, leading to syndication. Metromedia began its nationally syndicated run in January 1984.

George engaged guests whom he called "ludicrous liberal lunatics" and "fascist fanatics," including 1960s drug guru Dr. Timothy Leary and Tom Metzger, a white supremacist leader who was a particular target of George's ire. In many ways, Hot Seat inspired and was the precursor of other similar shows hosted by Morton Downey Jr., Jerry Springer, and Stephen Colbert. Downey actually appeared on Hot Seat on one occasion; he and George traded barbs numerous times over items ranging from who was a true conservative to the nature of the audience before Downey was tackled by "police".

At the height of its popularity in the mid- and late-1980s, fans of the show would wait for several hours to get a choice spot among the studio's 80 audience seats, where they waved U.S. flags and chanted, "Wal-ly! Wal-ly!" on cue. This ever increasing circus atmosphere became an integral part of the show's appeal; for instance, when Wally yelled "9-9-9", the fans in the studio would holler back "FIVE THOUSAND!" (a reference to the show's ticket line, 714-999-5000). Fans would often cheer Wally on and boo his guests, as if they were at a sporting event. Wally also hosted a afternoon live television call in show, where he would read a prepared daily commentary, and then take live phone calls on the air. The overwhelming majority of these calls were prank phone calls.

David Kennedy was the co-host for Hot Seat, seated to George's right from 1983 to 1989. Kennedy's persona was extremely mild-mannered, the polar opposite of George's, effectively acting as a straight man. In fact, Kennedy would often sit calmly and nearly mute throughout an entire show while histrionics took place all around him. Succeeding Kennedy was Bill Bancroft, a portly mustached man who wore glasses, and a security guard at Patrol One in Orange County. Bancroft was proud of the fact he held a bachelor's degree in history, and he told guest Dawna Kaufman not to 'tempt him' into having sex with him. Like Kennedy, however, Bancroft's role was mostly to introduce the guest; i.e. victim. Bancroft served as co-host from 1989 to 1990. Kennedy made one return appearance in 1992, and Bancroft returned during Hot Seat Highlights (which aired Monday-Friday at Midnight) in 2001.

George called his delivery "combat TV," a phrase he used in his autobiography published in 1999. Johnny Carson, referring to the show's choreographed hysteria, once called George the William F. Buckley of the cockfighting set. But George drew most of his ideas and interviewing style from 1960s radio and TV host Joe Pyne.

In 1984, the theme song was Eyewitness News, which was part of the Universal Production Music library (formerly Killer Tracks), and was composed by Craig Palmer. From 1984 to 1992, the theme song was World in Action, which was part of the APM Music library (formerly Bruton), and was composed by John Coleman.

Several soon-to-be stars made some of their first television appearances on this show, including disc jockey Jim "the Poorman" Trenton, "rape rock" band Mentors—particularly lead singer/drummer Eldon Hoke, Wrestler Charli Haynes, Wrestler Dee "Queen Kong" Booher, Wrestler Renee Vicary, punk band Rebel Rebel, Playboy model Becky LeBeau, rock band The Offspring, and future USA Up All Night hostesses Rhonda Shear.

In December 1992, due to a decline in advertising revenue and layoffs of 11 full-time and 10 part-time employees at the network's news operations, George stopped doing first-run episodes with a live studio audience. He would continue to show memorable moments from his program on Hot Seat Highlights. However, as the years went by, he became increasingly frail-looking, calmer, and face-lifted. After George died in 2003, KDOC stopped showing reruns altogether except for a retrospective/tribute on the Friday of the anniversary week of Wally George's death. It has not been seen since, although YouTube has an extensive archive of Hot Seat clips. Several of the former guests have formed a Facebook group called Wally George Alumni.

In 2018, Los Angeles alternative rock band Modern Time Machines released a music video with a Hot Seat skit and a cameo appearance by Hot Seat former regular Jim Myers, entitled "Freefall (Can't Stop)".

Many of the original tapes of the full episodes of this show do not exist anymore, as they were taped over by KDOC-TV, due to them not having the budget to archive them all.

On October 5, 2013, on the tenth anniversary of George's death, KDOC aired a 30th anniversary special honoring the show (titled Wally George: Remembering the Hot Seat), hosted by former station personality and show guest/antagonist Richard Blade.

As of 2020, Hot Seat is being rerun Saturday nights at 10 PM on its original station, KDOC.

== See also ==
- The Colbert Report
- The Morton Downey Jr. Show
