= Blase Bonpane =

American human rights activist (1929–2019)

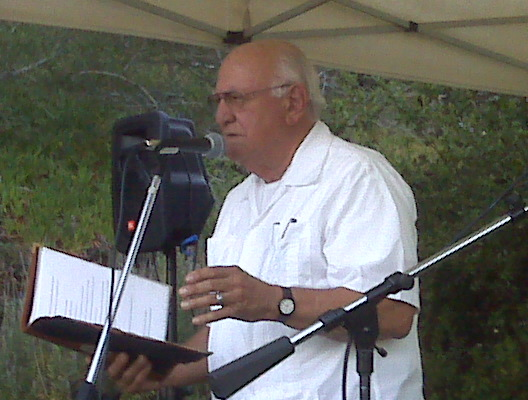
- Bonpane in 2010
- Born: April 24, 1929; Cleveland, Ohio, U.S.
- Died: April 8, 2019 (aged 89); Los Angeles, California, U.S.
- Education: University of California Irvine
- Occupations: Human rights and peace activist
- Organization: Office of the Americas

Blase Anthony Bonpane (April 24, 1929 – April 8, 2019) was an American human rights activist who served as the director of the Office of the Americas in Los Angeles, California, which he co-founded with his wife Theresa in 1983. Throughout his life, he worked on human rights issues as well as the identification of illegal and immoral aspects of United States government policy.

Bonpane served as a Maryknoll priest in Guatemala and was assigned by the Cardinal of Central America as National Advisor to Centro Capacitacion Social, a center for university and high school students working in the field with indigenous people on matters of health, literacy and labor organization. He was expelled from that country in 1967 in the midst of a revolution.

In 2006, The Nuclear Age Peace Foundation awarded Bonpane the Distinguished Peace Leadership Award.

In June 2018, Bonpane announced he would stop broadcasting World Focus.

== Education ==
Bonpane received his PhD in Social Science from University of California, Irvine in 1984. He has served on the faculties of the University of California Los Angeles, California State University Northridge, and California State University Los Angeles.

== Peace and justice activities ==
Bonpane hosted the radio program "World Focus" on Pacifica Radio station KPFK in Los Angeles at 10:00 am each Sunday (90.7 FM) as well as internationally from the KPFK site. On May 15 2018, after 50 years of broadcasting, Bonpane retired from the program. "Blase’s commentaries and his guests on World Focus were truth-tellers with a passion for justice, human rights, and peace. It’s an understatement to say he will be missed." He died two weeks short of his 90th birthday on April 8, 2019.

In 1983, Bonpane garnered notoriety following an appearance on Hot Seat, a television program hosted by conservative commentator Wally George. An argument about the U.S. invasion of Grenada turned into a dramatic physical confrontation when Bonpane overturned George's desk, live on-the-air, and stormed out of the studio.

Blase Bonpane was a leader of the International March for Peace in Central America, December 10, 1985 – January 27, 1986. This venture from Panama to Mexico included some 30 nations and 400 participants.

Bonpane served on the Advisory Council of the Nuclear Age Peace Foundation.

He played a significant role in the dialogue in Latin America between Christianity and Marxism. (Guatemala: Occupied Country, Eduardo Galeano, Monthly Review Press, 1969) Blase Bonpane led investigative delegations to Nicaragua, Cuba, Mexico, Panama, Honduras, Costa Rica and Peru. He traveled through the conflict zones of Chiapas, Mexico together with Bishop Samuel Ruiz on a series of peace missions and served on the board of SICSAL, a hemispheric ecumenical secretariat based in Mexico City. He also participated in peace missions to El Salvador, Colombia, Ecuador and Iraq. (See the Blase Bonpane Collection, Department of Special Collections, UCLA Research Library; Collection 1590).

== Electoral politics ==
Bonpane ran for the U.S. House of Representatives in 1992 as a member of the Green Party. He received 6,315 votes and 7.56% of the vote in Congressional District 30 (Los Angeles).

== Bibliography ==
- Guerrillas of Peace; Liberation Theology and the Central American Revolution, originally published by South End Press
- Guerrillas of Peace on the Air Red Hen Press 2002.
- Common Sense for the 21st Century' Red Hen Press 2010
- Civilization is Possible, Red Hen Press 2008.
- The Central American Solidarity Movement", University of California 2005.
- Imagine No Religion, (Blase Bonpane's autobiography) Red Hen Press 2011.
- Blase Bonpane Comments on The 2nd Encyclical of Pope Francis: Laudato Si (Praise Be to You) On The Care of Our Common Home; CreateSpace Independent Publishing, 2015.
- The Nicene Heresy - Christendom and War - Reverence and Critique; Office of the Americas publication, 2016.
