= Eugenia Clinchard =

American actress (1904–1989)

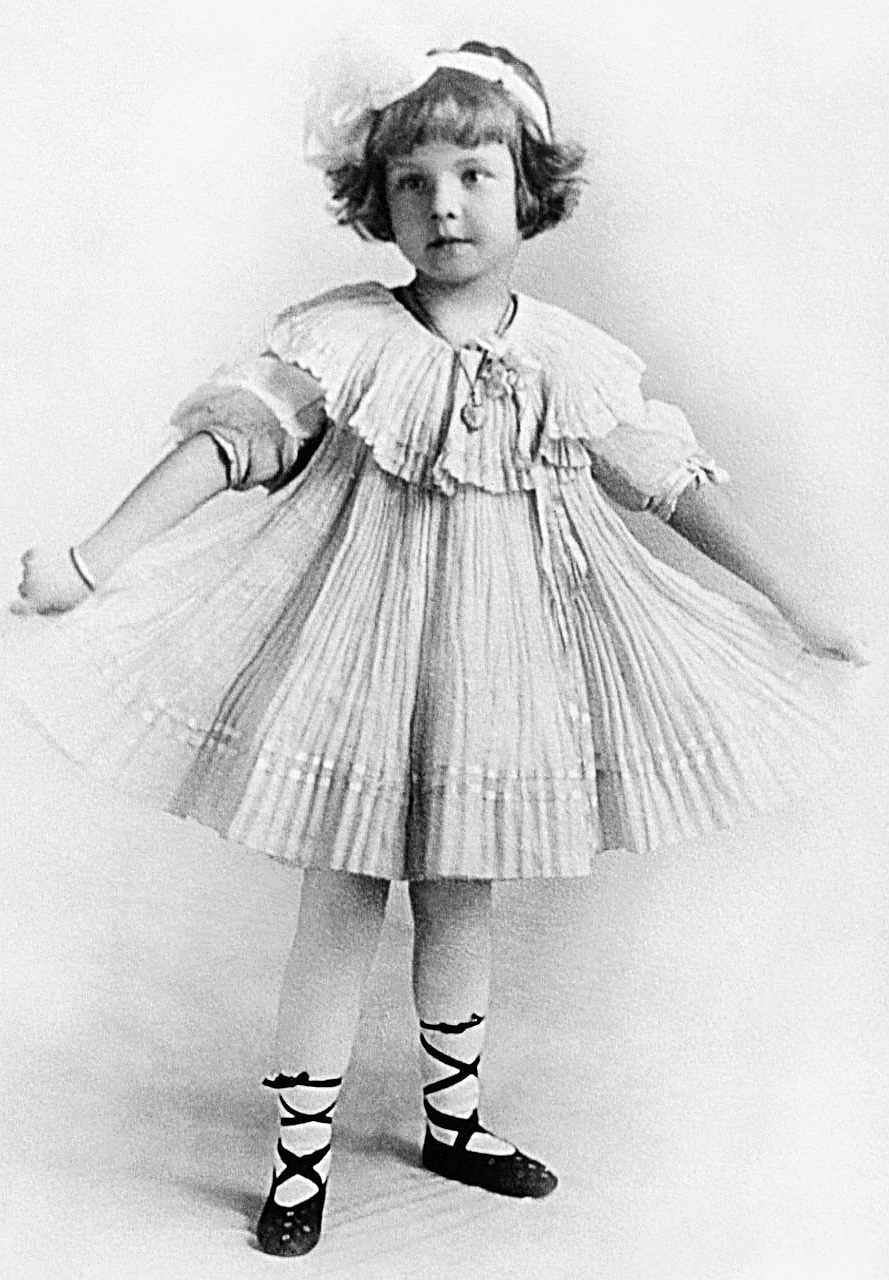
- Clinchard as a child
- Born: July 5, 1904; Alameda County, California, U.S.
- Died: May 15, 1989 (aged 84); Los Angeles, California, U.S.
- Occupation: Actress
- Children: Wally George
- Relatives: Rebecca De Mornay (granddaughter)

Eugenia M. Clinchard (July 5, 1904 – May 15, 1989) was an American child actress of the silent film era of the early 20th century. She appeared in numerous productions by Essanay Studios, including eleven Western films starring Broncho Billy Anderson. She was the mother of radio host Wally George, whose daughter is actress Rebecca De Mornay.

== Early life ==
Clinchard was the daughter of Frederick Balbach Clinchard and his wife Elsie B. (née Honnef), and was born on July 5, 1904 in Alameda County, California, where the family was living in 1910. Clinchard was raised in Oakland, California with her brother named Frederick "Fred" Clinchard. Her father was originally from the Seattle, Washington area.

In her late teens, she met and married a shipping company owner, Walter G Pearch. With him, she gave birth to a son, Walter George Pearch, also known as Wally George, the "Father of Combat TV." She was the grandmother of actress Rebecca De Mornay and musician Lizzie Grey. In her later years, she lived in Sherman Oaks, California.

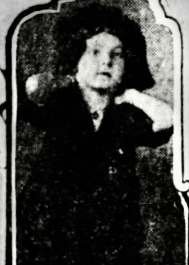
Clinchard in 1911

== Career ==
Clinchard began acting at age 3, and by age 5 she was working the Vaudeville circuit throughout the San Francisco Bay Area. Around this time, she caught the eye of Broncho Billy Anderson, credited with starting the western genre of film in Hollywood, and she joined his Essanay Studios. Clinchard went on to play a part in eleven Broncho Billy silent films, including Broncho Billy and the Sheriff's Kid and A Child of the West.

== Death ==
Clinchard died in Panorama City, Los Angeles, California on May 15, 1989.
