= Rebecca De Mornay =

American actress (born 1959)

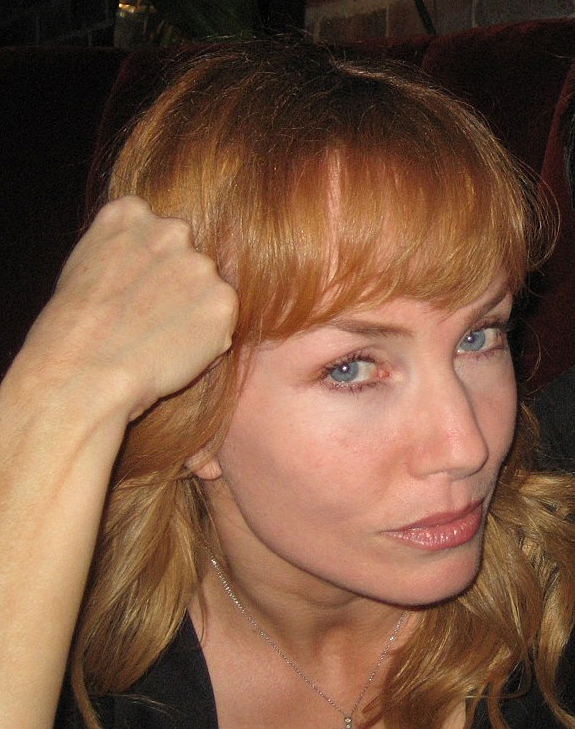
- De Mornay in 2006
- Born: Rebecca Jane Pearch; August 29, 1959 (age 67) (Note: Sources vary on De Mornay's birth year. Sources have given either a 1959, or 1962 birth year.); Santa Rosa, California, U.S.
- Other name: Rebecca George
- Occupation: Actress
- Years active: 1975, 1981–present
- Spouse: Bruce Wagner (m. 1986; div. 1990)
- Children: 2
- Parent(s): Wally George (father); Julie De Mornay (mother)
- Relatives: Eugenia Clinchard (grandmother)

Rebecca De Mornay (born August 29, 1959) is an American actress who has appeared in more than 60 films and television shows. Her breakthrough film role came in 1983, when she starred in Risky Business. De Mornay is also known for her roles in The Slugger's Wife (1985), Runaway Train (1985), The Trip to Bountiful (1985), Backdraft (1991), and The Hand That Rocks the Cradle (1992).

De Mornay's other major film credits include The Three Musketeers (1993), Never Talk to Strangers (1995), Identity (2003), Lords of Dogtown, Wedding Crashers (both 2005), and Mother's Day (2010). On television, she starred as Wendy Torrance in the miniseries adaptation of The Shining (1997), and as Dorothy Walker in Marvel's Jessica Jones (2015–19).

== Early life ==
De Mornay was born Rebecca Jane Pearch in Santa Rosa, California, the daughter of Julie and Wally George (né George Walter Pearch), a disc jockey and later television host. Her paternal grandmother was vaudeville performer and child film actress Eugenia Clinchard.

Her parents divorced in 1960, and she took the surname of her stepfather, Richard De Mornay, after her mother married him in 1961. She spent her early years in Pasadena, California, until her stepfather died of a stroke on March 2, 1962, aged 48. After his death, De Mornay and her half-brother Peter were raised by her mother, who relocated the family to Europe, where they lived in several different locations. She attended the independent Summerhill School in Leiston, Suffolk, England before completing her studies at a private high school in Germany.

== Career ==
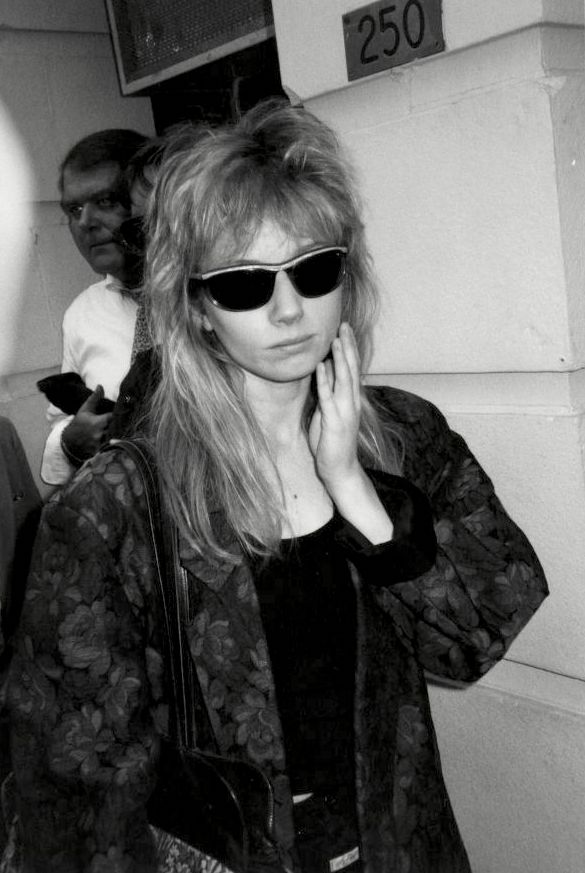
De Mornay in 1987

By the time she was 16, De Mornay had an agent who was selling her songs to German rock & roll musicians, and she had written the theme song for a kung fu movie called Goodbye Bruce Lee: His Last Game of Death (1975). In 1980, De Mornay returned to the United States and enrolled at the Lee Strasberg Institute to study acting. She made her film debut with a small part in Francis Ford Coppola's 1981 film One from the Heart, which starred her real-life partner at the time, Harry Dean Stanton.

Her star-making role came two years later in Risky Business (1983), as a call girl who seduces a high-school student played by Tom Cruise. In 1985, she played the title role in The Slugger's Wife opposite Michael O'Keefe, and co-starred in The Trip to Bountiful and Runaway Train, both of which were nominated for several Academy Awards. That same year, she appeared with Starship's Mickey Thomas in the music video for the song "Sara". The song reached No. 1 on the Billboard Hot 100 chart on March 15, 1986.

She also appeared in Roger Vadim's provocative 1988 remake of And God Created Woman, and as the wife of Kurt Russell's character in Ron Howard's Backdraft (1991). In 1990, she enacted the role of a USAF Captain pilot in HBO's successful Cold War film By Dawn's Early Light. One of De Mornay's most commercially successful films was the thriller The Hand That Rocks the Cradle, released in 1992. She starred as a defense lawyer in Sidney Lumet's murder drama Guilty as Sin (1993) with Don Johnson. Then she appeared in the 1995 drama film Never Talk to Strangers opposite Antonio Banderas, for which she was also the executive producer.

In 2003, she guest-starred as primary antagonist in the first two episodes of season 2 of Boomtown. In 2004, she guest-starred as attorney Hannah Rose for the last few episodes of The Practice and the following year, had a brief role alongside Owen Wilson and Vince Vaughn in Wedding Crashers. De Mornay also starred in the 2007 drama American Venus.

In June 2007, she appeared in the HBO series John from Cincinnati with a starring role as matriarch of a troubled Imperial Beach, California, surfing family and the grandmother/guardian of a teen surfer on the brink of greatness. She appeared in Darren Lynn Bousman's Mother's Day (2010).

In 2012, De Mornay played the role of Finch's mom in the movie American Reunion where she portrayed an attractive older woman and a love interest of Stifler. From 2015 to 2019, she appeared in Jessica Jones as Trish Walker's abusive mother.

== Personal life ==
De Mornay dated actor Harry Dean Stanton in the early 1980s. They met in 1981 on the set of One from the Heart and dated until De Mornay and Tom Cruise began an affair while filming Risky Business in 1982. De Mornay and Cruise parted in 1985.

De Mornay married writer Bruce Wagner on December 16, 1986; they divorced in 1990.

De Mornay subsequently dated and was briefly engaged to singer Leonard Cohen. She co-produced Cohen's 1992 album The Future, which is also dedicated to her.

De Mornay was in a relationship with actor turned sportscaster Patrick O'Neal. They have two daughters together.

== Filmography ==
=== Film ===
Rebecca De Mornay film work
Year	Title	Role	Notes
1982	One from the Heart	Understudy	Credited as Rebecca de Mornay
1983	Risky Business	Lana	
1983	Testament	Cathy Pitkin	
1985	The Slugger's Wife	Debby Palmer	
1985	Runaway Train	Sara	
1985	The Trip to Bountiful	Thelma	
1987	Beauty and the Beast	Beauty	
1988	Feds	Elizabeth "Ellie" DeWitt	
1988	And God Created Woman	Robin Shea Moran	
1989	Dealers	Anna Schuman	
1990	By Dawn's Early Light	Captain Moreau, USAF	
1991	Backdraft	Helen McCaffrey	
1992	The Hand That Rocks the Cradle	Mrs. Mott / Peyton Flanders	MTV Movie Award for Best Villain
1993	Guilty as Sin	Jennifer Haines	
1993	The Three Musketeers	Milady de Winter	
1995	Never Talk to Strangers	Dr. Sarah Taylor	Executive producer
1996	The Winner	Louise	Credited as Rebecca DeMornay
1999	Thick as Thieves	Det. Louise Petrone	
1999	A Table for One	Ruth Draper	
2000	The Right Temptation	Derian McCall	
2003	Identity	Caroline Suzanne	Credited as Rebecca DeMornay
2004	Raise Your Voice	Aunt Nina	
2005	Lords of Dogtown	Philaine	
2005	Wedding Crashers	Mrs. Kroeger	
2007	American Venus	Celia Lane	
2007	Music Within	Mrs. Pimental	
2010	Flipped	Patsy Loski	
2010	Mother's Day	Natalie "Mother" Koffin	
2011	A Fonder Heart	Dr. Bach	
2011	Apartment 1303 3D	Maddie Slate	
2012	American Reunion	Rachel Finch	
2015	Collar	Mayor Ramona 'Nomi' Billingsley	
2016	I Am Wrath	Vivian Hill	
2018	Periphery	Vi Warner	
2020	She Ball	Aggie	
2024	Peter Five Eight	Brenda	
2024	Saint Clare	Gigi Newberry	
2026	The Gentleman Thief	Odessa	

=== Television ===
Rebecca De Mornay television work
Year	Title	Role	Notes
1986	Tall Tales & Legends	Slew Foot Sue	Episode: "Pecos Bill"
1986	The Murders in the Rue Morgue	Claire Dupin	Television film
1990	By Dawn's Early Light	Captain Moreau	Television film
1991	An Inconvenient Woman	Flo March	Television film
1993	Blind Side	Linda Kaines	Television film
1994	Getting Out	Arlene Holsclaw	Television film
1995	The Outer Limits	Woman	Episode: "The Conversion". Also directed the episode.
1997	The Shining	Wendy Torrance	Miniseries
1998	The Con	Barbara Beaton / Nancy Thoroughgood	Television film
1999	Night Ride Home	Nora Mahler	Television film
1999	ER	Elaine Nichols	5 episodes
2000	Range of Motion	Lainey Berman	Television film
2001	A Girl Thing	Kim McCormack	Television film
2002	Salem Witch Trials	Elizabeth Parris	Television film
2003	No Place Like Home	Liz	Television pilot
2003	Boomtown	Sabrina Fithian / Jill Foster	2 episodes
2004	The Practice	Hannah Rose	4 episodes
2006	Law & Order: Special Victims Unit	Tessa McKellen	Episode: "Manipulated"
2007	John from Cincinnati	Cissy Yost	5 episodes
2013	Hatfields & McCoys	Mary Hatfield	Unaired pilot
2013	Hawaii Five-0	Barbara Cotchin	Episode: "A ia la aku"
2015–2019	Jessica Jones	Dorothy Walker	13 episodes
2016, 2021	Lucifer	Penelope Decker	3 episodes
2024–2025	NCIS	Carla Marino	2 episodes

=== Music videos ===
Rebecca De Mornay music video work
Year	Artist	Song	Role
1985	Starship	"Sara"	Sara

== Sources ==
- Kiehn, David (2003). Broncho Billy and the Essanay Film Company. Berkeley, California: Farewell Books. ISBN 978-09729-2265-4.
- Thomson, David (2010). The New Biographical Dictionary of Film: Completely Updated and Expanded. New York City, New York: Knopf Doubleday Publishing Group. ISBN 978-0-3075-9461-7.
