= Pope John Paul II (miniseries) =

2005 TV Miniseries

- Screenplay by: Francesco Contaldo; Salvatore Basile; Francesco Arlanch; Wesley Bishop; John Kent Harrison
- Story by: Francesco Contaldo
- Directed by: John Kent Harrison
- Starring: Jon Voight; Cary Elwes; James Cromwell; Ben Gazzara; Christopher Lee; Giuliano Gemma
- Composer: Marco Frisina
- Country of origin: United States
- Original language: English
- No. of episodes: 2

Production
- Executive producer: Anselmo Parrinello
- Producers: Luca Bernabei; Fania Petrocchi; Krzysztof Grabowski; Slawomir Jozwik; D. Marcial Cuquerella
- Cinematography: Fabrizio Lucci
- Editors: Henk Van Eeghen; Alessandro Lucidi
- Running time: 200 minutes (2 parts)
- Production companies: LuxVide; Rai Fiction; CBS; Rai Trade; Grupo Intereconomia; Baltmedia Projektor

Original release
- Network: CBS
- Release: December 4 – December 7, 2005

Pope John Paul II is a 2005 television miniseries dramatizing the life of Pope John Paul II (Karol Józef Wojtyła) from his early adult years in Poland to his death at age 84.

The miniseries was written and directed by John Kent Harrison and aired in the United States on the CBS network on December 4 and 7, 2005. It was first released in Vatican City on November 17, 2005 and ten days later throughout Italy on Rai 1.

Jon Voight portrays an older Karol Wojtyła (after his investiture as pope in 1978), while Cary Elwes portrays Wojtyła in his earlier life from 1939 to 1978. Voight was nominated for an Emmy Award for his performance.

Pope John Paul II co-stars James Cromwell as Archbishop Adam Stefan Cardinal Sapieha, Ben Gazzara as Agostino Cardinal Casaroli, and Christopher Lee as Stefan Cardinal Wyszyński. Polish actor Mikolaj Grabowski is seen twice playing Joseph Cardinal Ratzinger of Germany, who would succeed John Paul II as Pope Benedict XVI.

== Plot ==
Part 1: (December 4, 2005)

The miniseries opens in 1981 with the Pope John Paul II assassination attempt, then flashes back to the young Karol "Lolek" Wojtyla who survives World War II by working in Kraków's Zakrzowek quarry and Solvay's chemical plant while secretly embracing the illicit Theatre of Poland to keep Polish culture alive. Wojtyla accepts a calling to study for the priesthood and joins an underground seminary, involving himself non violently in the Polish Resistance movement. In 1945, World War II ends with the Soviet occupation and eventual takeover of Poland. In 1946, Wojtyla is ordained a priest and is sent to Rome for his graduate studies while the Communists hunt down and eliminate anybody who had any ties to the Home Army and/or Polish government in exile during the war. Wojtyla returns to Poland in 1948 for his first pastoral assignment in Niegowic. In 1949, he is transferred St. Florian's church in Krakow, where he also is a counselor to students at Jagiellonian University. Adam Sapieha, one of his mentors, dies in 1951. In 1956, Wojtyla is appointed ethics professor at the Catholic University of Lublin. In 1958, the Holy See appoints him Kraków's auxiliary bishop—Poland's youngest bishop ever and in 1959, he ends the decade by holding Nowa Huta's first Mass outdoors on Christmas Eve in the Communists's newly completed "city without God".

After leading an unusual procession of the Black Madonna's empty picture frame through Krakow, Wojtyla attends all four Vatican II sessions, where he impresses many influential foreign cardinals with his charisma, multilingualism and viewpoints, both before and during his term as Kraków's archbishop. After being made a cardinal in 1967 by Pope Paul VI, Wojtyla returns to Poland as Karol Cardinal Wojtyla, and miraculously cures a bone marrow cancer victim by praying to Padre Pio. Paul VI dies in 1978 and papal conclave, August 1978 convenes, electing Albino Cardinal Luciani as Pope John Paul I, who himself dies only 33 days later. The cardinals then reconvene with papal conclave, October 1978 and Wojtyla is told by Wyszynski to accept the position if he is elected—for Poland's sake.

Part 2: (December 7, 2005)

Opening on October 16, 1978 with deadlocked balloting, Wojtyla wins the papal election as the first non-Italian pope since Adrian VI in 1522, naming himself John Paul II. In his papal inauguration speech, he says "be not afraid", causing Soviet leaders to decide that Wojtyla is "no friend of Marxism". Afterwards, he performs papal mediation in the Beagle conflict between Argentina and Chile. In 1979, he receives Soviet foreign minister Andrei Gromyko at the Vatican, writes his first papal encyclical—Redemptor hominis—and visits Mexico where he is seen by millions. He then visits Poland with audiences also in the millions and afterwards the United States. He supports Polish Solidarity and receives Lech Wałęsa at the Vatican. The 1981 assassination attempt occurs; Wojtyla recovers while his former mentor, Stefan Wyszynski, who he talked on the phone to during both of their hospitalizations, dies in Poland 15 days after the failed attempt on Wojtyla. After his recovery, Pope John Paul II appoints Cardinal Ratzinger Prefect of the Congregation for the Doctrine of the Faith, after which he is visited by U.S. President Ronald Reagan and First Lady Nancy, visits Poland again to see Walesa and visits Rebibbia prison to forgive his failed assassin, Mehmet Ali Agca. In December 1984, he appoints Joaquin Navarro-Valls director of the Holy See Press Office, announces World Youth Day in 1985 and witnesses the downfall of East bloc Communism in 1989.

During the 1990s, Pope John Paul II fails to stop the Invasion of Kuwait and the following Gulf War. He responds to the abortion debate with his Letter to Women encyclical. His book, Crossing the Threshold of Hope, becomes a best-seller. John Paul II suffers from increasing symptoms of Parkinson's disease but he keeps a busy schedule. In response to his own suffering, he writes his Evangelium Vitae encyclical as opposition to a worldwide culture of death. He tries to improve Christian–Jewish reconciliation and Holy See–Israel relations. In 2000, he starts the third millennium by apologizing for the Church's sins committed during its history, watches the 9-11 attacks in 2001 with horror and in 2002, addresses American cardinals about a different horror: the "appalling sin" of abusive clergy and religious orders members revealed in that year's Catholic sex abuse scandal. His last public appearance is shown, then his death is announced, with a voice-over of his last requests and a montage of earlier events amid the closing credits and main film score.

== Cast ==
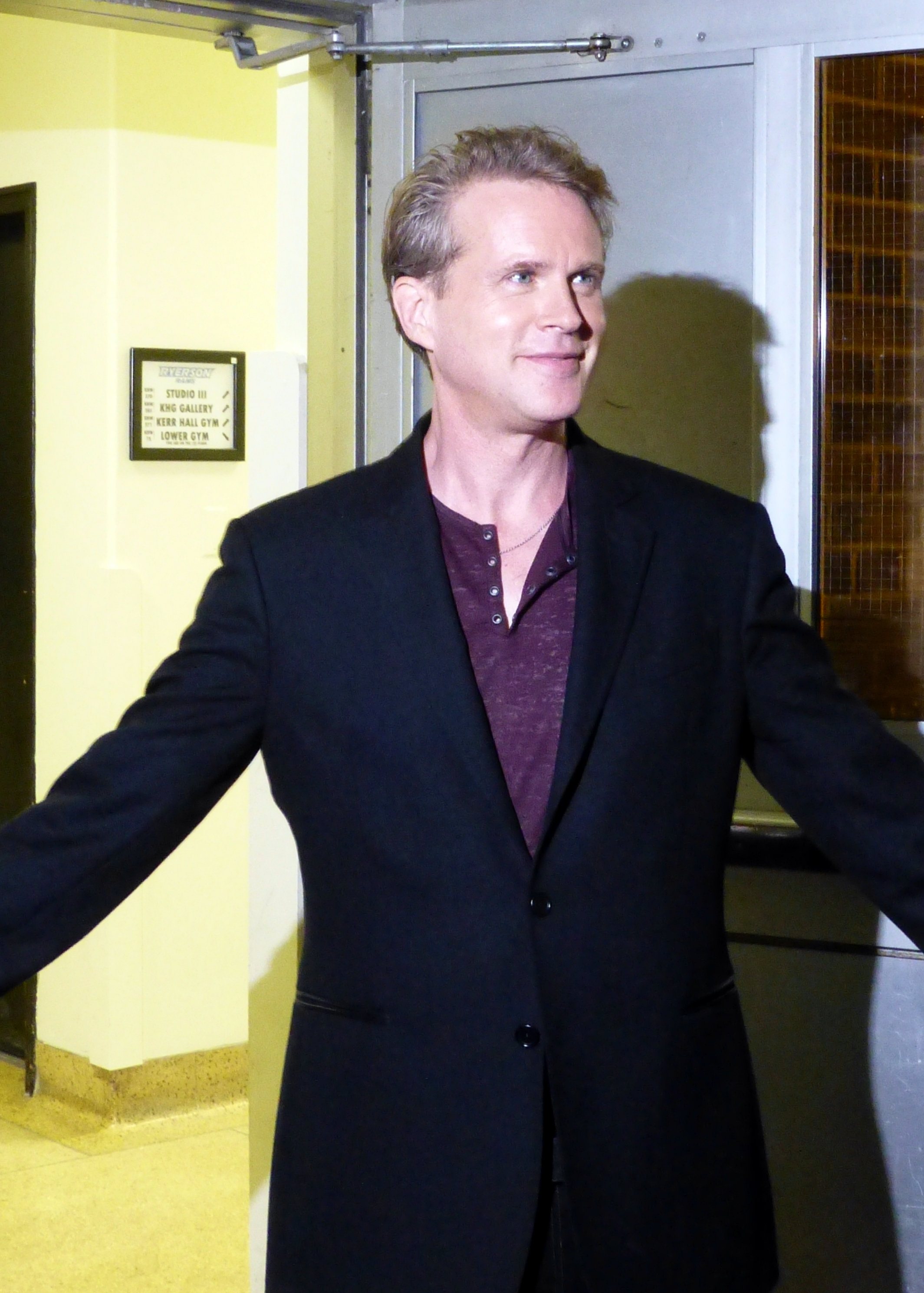
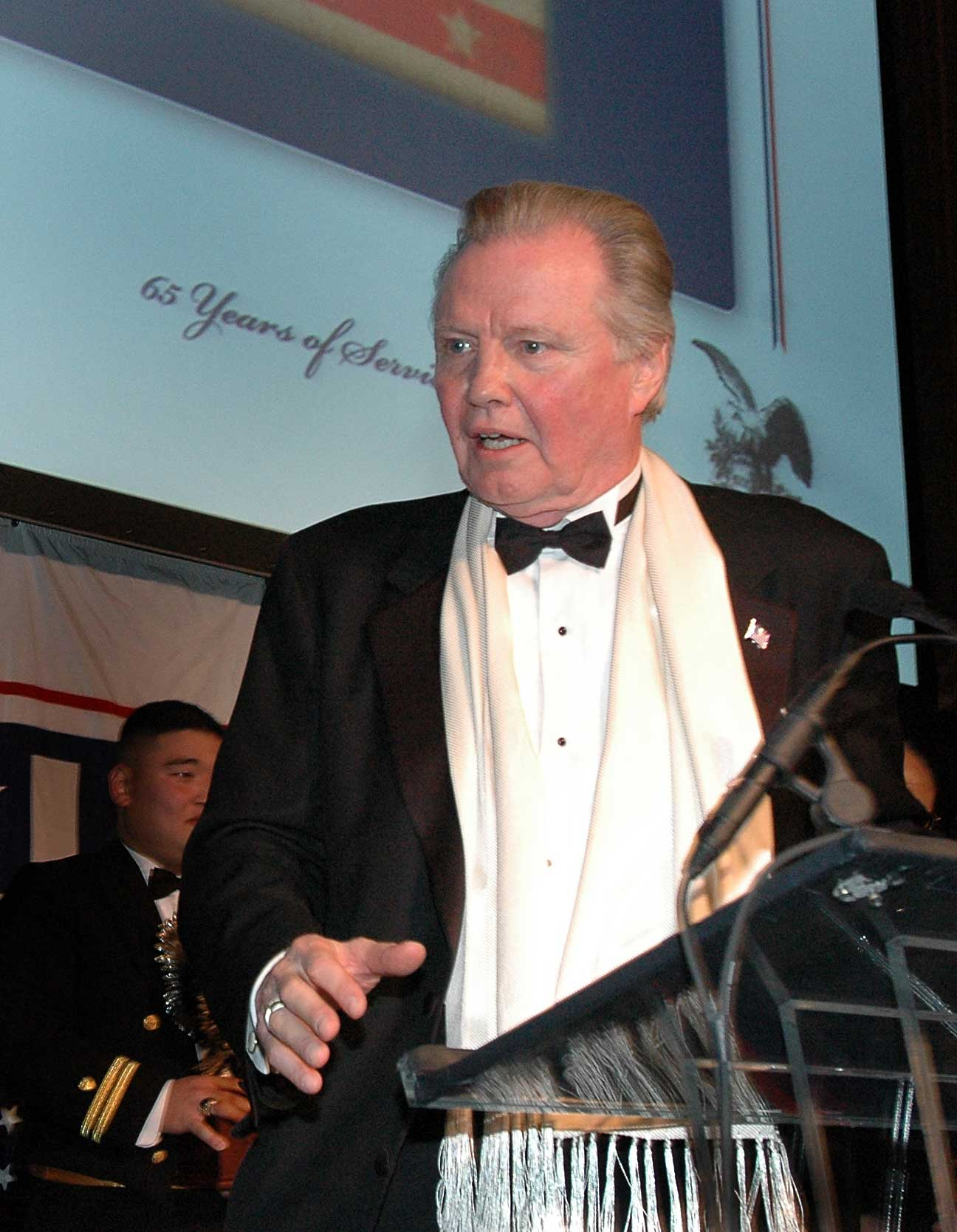
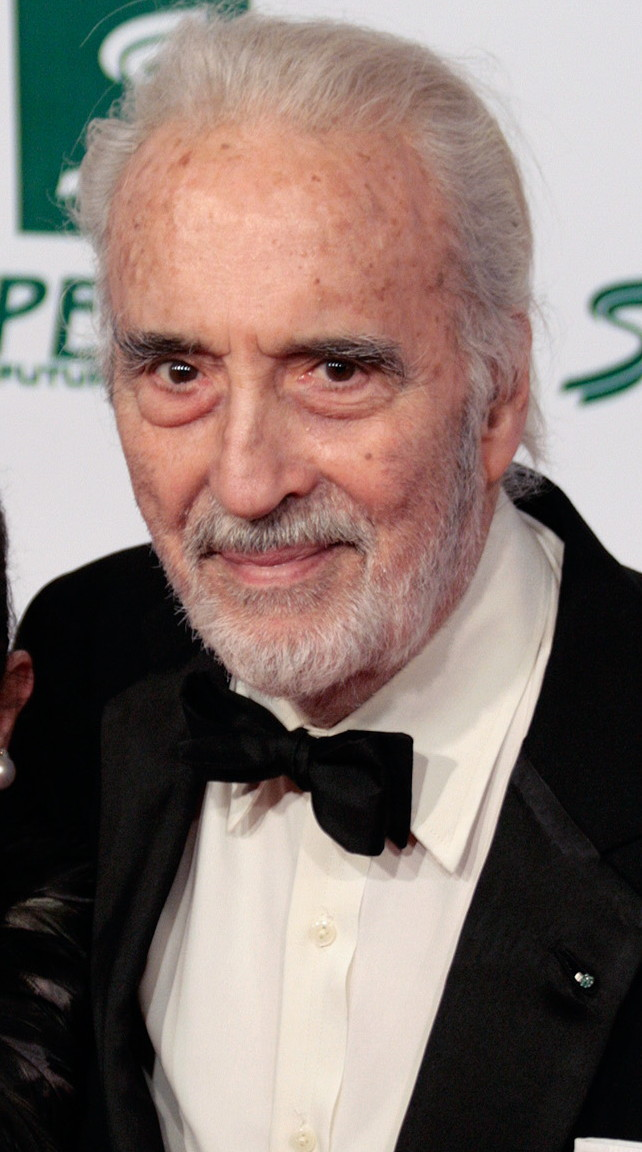
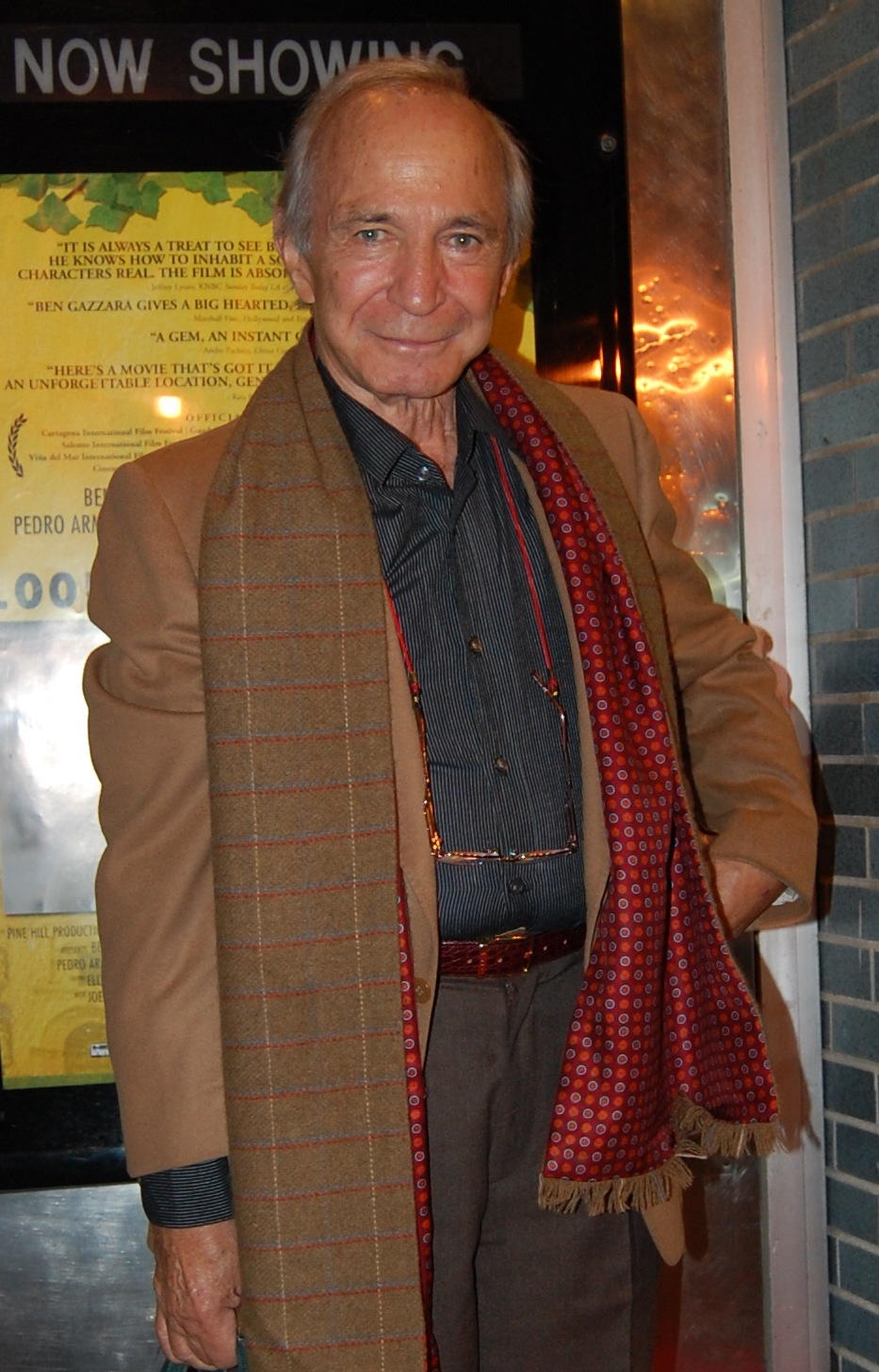
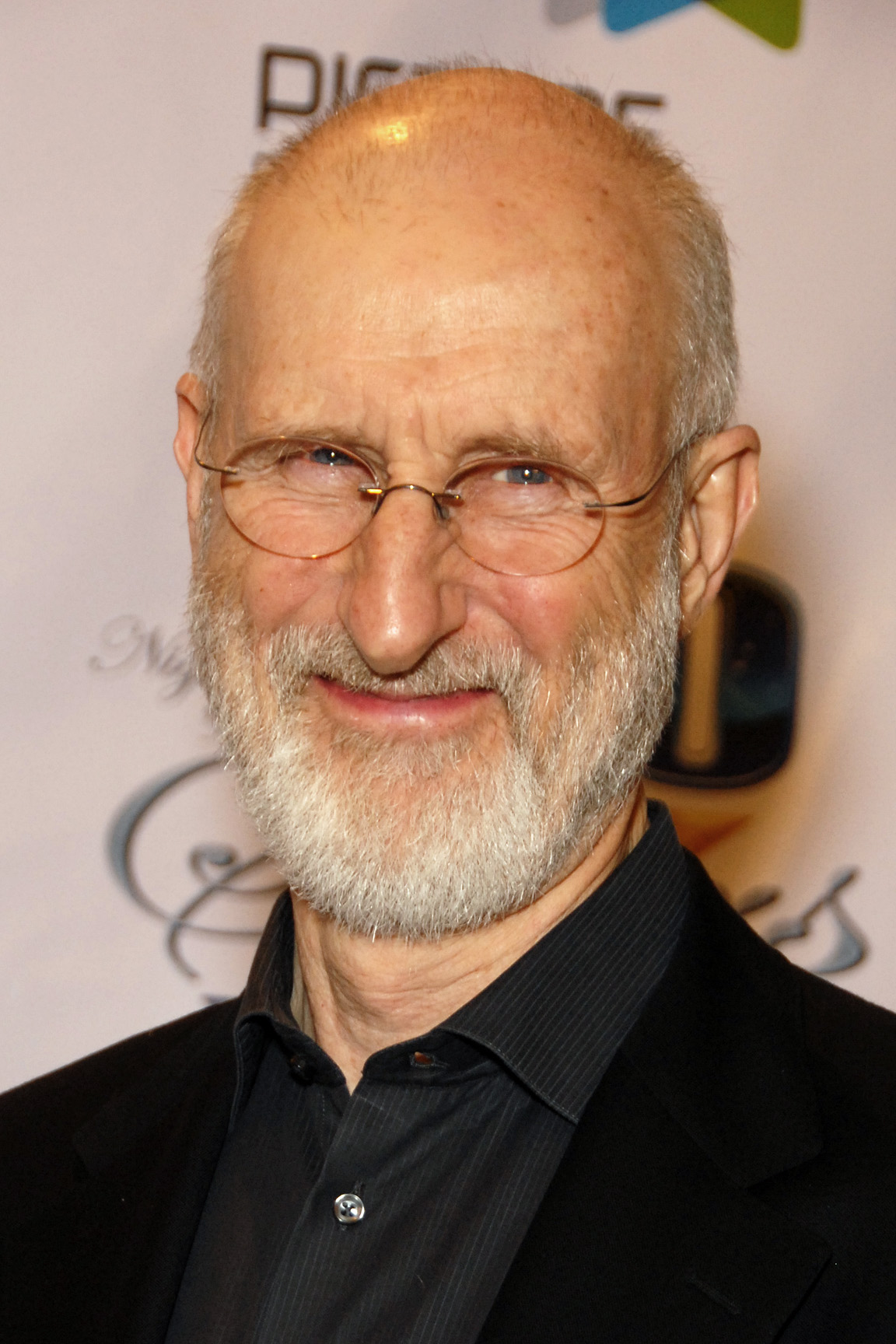
From left to right: Cary Elwes (pictured in 2015) and Jon Voight (2006) play the younger and older versions of Karol Wojtyła, respectively. Both performances received critical acclaim, with Voight earning a Primetime Emmy Award nomination for Outstanding Lead Actor in a Limited or Anthology Series or Movie. The supporting cast stars Sir Christopher Lee (2009) as Cardinal Wyszyński, Ben Gazzara (2009) as Cardinal Casaroli, and James Cromwell (2010) as Cardinal Sapieha.
- Jon Voight as Pope John Paul II
- Cary Elwes as Young Karol Wojtyła
- Ben Gazzara as Agostino Cardinal Casaroli
- Christopher Lee as Stefan Cardinal Wyszyński
- Vittoria Belvedere as Ewa
- James Cromwell as Adam Stefan Cardinal Sapieha
- Daniele Pecci as Roman (inspired by Jerzy Kluger)
- Ettore Bassi as Gapa
- Chiara Conti as Anna
- Valeria Cavalli as Teresa
- Marcin Kuźmiński as Michał
- Giulietta Revel as Halina
- Robert Gonera as Tadeusz
- Krzysztof Pieczyński as Czerny
- Christopher Good as Franz Cardinal König
- Fabrizio Bucci as Krzysztof Zachuta
- Giuliano Gemma as Dr. Joaquín Navarro-Valls
- Wenanty Nosul as Stanisław Dziwisz
- Jan Niklas as Young Dziwisz
- Harald Posch as Hans Frank
- Mikołaj Grabowski as Joseph Cardinal Ratzinger
- Jacek Lenartowicz as Lech Wałęsa
- Massimiliano Ubaldi as Mehmet Ali Ağca
- Andrzej Blumenfeld as Edward Gierek
- Ryszard Radwanski as Gomulka
- Giacomo Piperno as Cardinal Felici
- Paolo Paolini as Jean-Marie Cardinal Villot
- Nicola Pistoia as Maximilien Cardinal de Fürstenberg
- Giulio Base as Pope Paul VI
- Zygmunt Józefczak as Bishop Eugeniusz Baziak
- Michele Gammino as Leonid Brezhnev
- Ewa Zytkiewicz as Andrei Gromyko
- Fabrizio Jovine as Yuri Andropov
- Andrzej Szopa as Mikhail Gorbachev
- Marc Fiorini as Giorgio La Pira
