= List of From Dusk till Dawn characters =

There are many characters in the From Dusk till Dawn franchise.

== Cast and characters ==
Character	Original films			Television series
Character	From Dusk till Dawn (1996)	From Dusk Till Dawn 2: Texas Blood Money (1999)	From Dusk Till Dawn 3: The Hangman's Daughter (2000)	From Dusk till Dawn: The Series
Seth Gecko	George Clooney			D. J. Cotrona
Richard 'Richie' Gecko	Quentin Tarantino			Zane Holtz
Jacob Fuller	Harvey Keitel			Robert Patrick
Katherine 'Kate' Fuller	Juliette Lewis			Madison Davenport
Scott Fuller	Ernest Liu			Brandon Soo Hoo
Santanico Pandemonium 'Esmeralda/Kisa'	Salma Hayek		Ara Celi	Eiza González
Earl McGraw	Michael Parks			Don Johnson; Jesse Johnson (as Young Earl McGraw)
Edgar McGraw		James Parks		
Razor Charlie/Eddie	Danny Trejo	Danny Trejo	Danny Trejo	Sam Medina (as Razor Charlie)
Carlos	Cheech Marin			Wilmer Valderrama (as Carlos Madrigal)
Sex Machine	Tom Savini			Jake Busey (as Aiden Tanner)
Bud		Robert Patrick		
Luther		Duane Whitaker		
Sheriff Otis Lawson		Bo Hopkins		
C.W. Niles		Muse Watson		
Ray Bob		Brett Harrelson		
Jesus Draven		Raymond Cruz		
Johnny Madrid			Marco Leonardi	
Quixtla			Sonia Braga	
The Hangman			Temuera Morrison	
Ambrose Bierce			Michael Parks	
Ezra Traylor			Orlando Jones	
Catherine Reece			Jordana Spiro	
Ranger Ferdinand "Freddie" Gonzalez				Jesse Garcia
Lord Amancio Malvado				Esai Morales

== From Dusk till Dawn ==
=== Seth Gecko ===
Seth Gecko (George Clooney) is the main protagonist and brief antagonist in the 1996 film, From Dusk till Dawn and its 2001 spin-off video game of the same name. Seth Gecko and his brother Richie are two dangerous criminals on a wild crime spree. Compared to his violent brother, Seth is a more calm, rational individual, always intending to keep his word to release his hostages if they comply with his demands. He was hampered by his brother's more violent nature. After kidnapping a father and his two kids, the Geckos head South to a Mexican bar to hide out in safety. After they face the bar's vampire clientele, they're forced to team up with their hostages in order to make it out alive. In the spin-off video game, Seth has been condemned to death for the Titty Twister murders and is now in the Rising Sun high-security prison, a converted tanker floating off the coast of New Orleans. Seth briefly appears in a photo cameo in the black comedy Curdled.

=== Richie Gecko ===
Richie Gecko (Quentin Tarantino) is a deranged rapist and murderer who, along with his brother Seth, kidnaps a preacher and his two kids and flees for the safety of a remote nightclub in Mexico. Unluckily for Kate Fuller (daughter of the preacher), she is the prime priority of Richie's intentions. He has schizophrenia. It also appears that he only rapes those he thinks that want to have sex, for example, when he sees Kate Fuller he imagines her asking him "Richie, would you do me a favor and eat my pussy for me... please?" The Geckos later go to the nightclub which is full of vampires; Richie is murdered by dancer vampire Santánico Pandemonium, who bites him on the neck. Although it is believed he's dead, he comes back as a vampire. Seth is forced to kill him by jamming a pool cue into his chest. Richie briefly appears in a photo cameo in the black comedy Curdled.

=== Jacob Fuller ===
Jacob Fuller (Harvey Keitel) and his two children, Kate and Scott, have been kidnapped by outlaws Seth and Richie Gecko. The Geckos demand that the family sneak the convicts across the border and into Mexico using Jacob's RV. After doing this, the Geckos force the family to join them at the Titty Twister, where the place turns out to be inhabited by the vampires. Jacob and his family are forced to team up with Seth in order to make it out alive. Jacob is bitten by Sex Machine but continues to help the others to battle the vampires until transforming. He then bites Scott before Scott kills him.

=== Kate Fuller ===
Kate Fuller (Juliette Lewis) is kidnapped, along with her father and brother, by the Gecko brothers. Immediately, Richie is smitten with her, albeit only with lustful intentions. When the vampires reveal themselves, Kate is quick to jump into action and help destroy the monstrosities. Apart from Seth Gecko, Kate is the only person to make it out of the Titty Twister alive. In the end, she is left with the camper (and money Seth gave her) after Seth refuses to take her with him to El Rey.

=== Scott Fuller ===
Scott Fuller (Ernest Liu) is kidnapped, along with his father and sister, by the Gecko brothers. When his father Jacob turns, Scott hesitates to kill him and is mobbed by ravenous vampires. Kate shoots him to end his suffering.

=== Santanico Pandemonium ===
Santanico Pandemonium (formerly known as Esmeralda) (portrayed by Salma Hayek in the first film and Ara Celi in the third) is the 102 year old vampire queen and main attraction as an exotic and seductive dancer at the Titty Twister. She begins the vampires' feeding frenzy when she kills Richie Gecko in a spur-of-the-moment surge of bloodlust, triggered by his bleeding hand. She kills a second character in the Deleted Scenes section of the DVD. Santanico, in human form, sits on the lap of a dazed and wounded biker (portrayed by Gregory Nicotero of KNB Effects). Holding his gaze for a moment, a second mouth that resembles a monstrous snake erupts from her mouth and bites his head off. She is killed by Seth Gecko, who shoots down a chandelier to impale her.

In the third film, set 83 years before the first one, in 1913 Mexico, Santanico (born Esmeralda) is the 19 year old dhampir daughter of the local hangman, Mauricio and the vampire priestess, Quixtla who is the owner of a brothel. She gets kidnapped by Johnny Madrid, a local outlaw. In the climax, Quixtla reveals Esmeralda's heritage and her and Esmeralda's vampire grandmother turn her into a full fledged vampire princess renaming her as Santanico Pandemonium. Santanico then kills her grandmother and turns her father who then kills Quixtla by exposing her to sunlight while Santanico hides from the sunlight. While the entrance to the brothel is being closed, Santanico screams to the leaving Madrid not to leave her but unfortunately, the door closes on her. She then becomes the queen of the brothel which later becomes the Titty Twister and works as an exotic dancer, seducing patrons and feeding on their blood.

Her personality as Esmeralda was a nice, young woman who was caring and gentle, but as Santanico, she's very cruel, seductive and inconsiderate, even planning to turn Seth into her slave.

=== Kelly Houge ===
Kelly Houge (Kelly Preston) is a newscaster who reports on the Gecko brothers' rampage. Preston also played the character in the black comedy Curdled.

=== Earl McGraw ===
Earl McGraw (Michael Parks) is a Texas Ranger who is killed by Richie Gecko in the opening scene of the film. After appearing, he has since made cameos in other films. His son Edgar McGraw appears in From Dusk Till Dawn 2: Texas Blood Money.

=== Sex Machine ===
Sex Machine (Tom Savini) is a biker. He is one of the patrons at the Titty Twister, and one of the few to fight back against the vampires initial attack on the customers, and also one of the few to survive. While staking vampirized customers, Sex Machine is bitten by one of them. Sex Machine hides his bite until he transforms into a vampire, and promptly infects Frost and Jacob and lets the vampires congregating outside into the Titty Twister. When the remaining survivors fight back against the vampires, Sex Machine is killed by Seth and transforms into a large, rat-like creature. Sex Machine tries to kill Seth, but is shot in the chest by Kate with a crossbow and tossed into a fire pit, setting him ablaze.

=== Frost ===
Frost (Fred Williamson) is a Vietnam veteran and one of the patrons at the Titty Twister. During the war, Frost was severely injured and scarred by an explosion during a Vietcong attack that killed the rest of his platoon. The Vietcong assumed him to be dead and left him with the corpses of his platoon; eventually, Frost snapped and murdered the entire Vietcong squadron. Frost is one of the few patrons to fight back against the vampires during the attack, and is one of the few survivors as well. While he recounts his backstory to rally the other survivors, Sex Machine turns into a vampire and bites Frost in the throat. Frost knocks Sex Machine through the barricaded door, accidentally allowing the other vampires to enter; Frost then changes into a vampire himself. Frost is killed during the remaining survivors’ last stand when Jacob impales him with a shotgun.

=== Pete Bottoms ===
Pete Bottoms (John Hawkes) is a clerk who owns a shop which McGraw frequently attends. Seth and Richie hold Pete up, forcing him to act as if nothing is wrong for McGraw. Richie shoots McGraw under the (wrong) belief that Pete mouthed "help us" to him. Pete is non-fatally shot by Richie, but grabs a gun and engages in a shootout with the Geckos that ends with him being set on fire and burnt alive.

=== Razor Charlie ===
Razor Charlie (Danny Trejo) is the Titty Twister's vampire bartender.

== From Dusk till Dawn 2: Texas Blood Money ==
=== Buck ===
Buck (Robert Patrick) is a bank robber who, with a group of friends goes south of the border in order pull off a bank robbery worth $1 million, but his group have become vampires and they develop a thirst for blood to match their hunger for the money. Buck is forced to join arch rival Sheriff Lawson in an action-packed, kill-or-be-killed battle to stop these vampires and save their own lives. Together, they manage to kill the group. The deputy is killed in the battle and Buck escapes with the money.

=== Luther ===
Luther Heggs (Duane Whitaker) is one of the five bank robbers. He escapes to Mexico with blueprints for a million-dollar heist, but on his way to the rendezvous point, he gets into an accident and stumbles upon the Titty Twister bar, where he gets a bite by the vampire. This little detour sets up the terror that awaits the outlaws and the officers on their trail. He's staked from behind by Buck while trying to get away.

=== Jesus ===
Jesus Draven (Raymond Cruz) is one of the bank robbers and is the second person to turn into a vampire.

=== Edgar McGraw ===
Edgar McGraw (James Parks) appears briefly in two scenes in From Dusk Till Dawn 2: Texas Blood Money. His fellow Texas Ranger Otis Lawson references his cold demeanor and distracted nature, including the murder of his father Earl.

=== Otis Lawson ===
Otis Lawson (Bo Hopkins) is a Texas Ranger tracking down the bank robbers.

== From Dusk till Dawn 3: The Hangman's Daughter ==
=== Johnny Madrid ===
Narrowly escaping death, outlaw Johnny Madrid (Marco Leonardi) is on the run from the hangman with the hangman's sensuous daughter Esmeralda by his side. Along with Madrid's gang, Johnny and Esmeralda embark on an adventure filled with colorful and unsavory characters who lead them straight into the fight of their lives.

=== Quixtla ===
Quixtla (Sonia Braga) is the mother of Santanico Pandemonium, the Hangman's former lover and the Vampire Queen of the remote early 1900s Mexican saloon in the film, which is named "La Tetilla Del Diablo" (The Devil's Nipple), a reference to the name of the 1960s-era establishment in the first Dusk to Dawn film ("the Titty Twister") where Santanico recreates the vampire feast hosted by her mother Quixtla as depicted in the third film.

=== The Hangman ===
The Hangman (Temuera Morrison) is the hangman in the town shown in the opening scenes of the film, and father of Esmerelda (who later became Santanico Pandemonium). After Esmerelda leaves town with Johnny Madrid, The Hangman tracks them to the vampire's bar where he becomes caught up in the epic battle for survival. He sides with Johnny Madrid and Ambrose Bierce in the final showdown and fights the vampires. He is bitten and turns into a vampire but manages to remain a fragment of his humanity and impales Quixtla allowing Madrid and Bierce to escape.

=== Ambrose Bierce ===
Ambrose Bierce (Michael Parks) is the only fictional character in the From Dusk Till Dawn series based on a real historical figure, Ambrose Bierce (1842-1913), a widely quoted American journalist, adventurer and socio-political satirist noted for his expert sarcasm, such as the darkly sardonic The Devil's Dictionary (1906). He was also a real-life atheist (mentioned in the film) and may have had "diverse" interests, thus making his choice as the main character for this film both a clever devil worship reference and historically believable: the real Bierce did famously travel to Chihuahua, Mexico in 1913, intending to interview the charismatic revolutionary leader Pancho Villa. Bierce is depicted in the film as a cynical tough-guy alcoholic who is plagued by nightmares with glimpses of vampires and his own death (the opening scene suggests the real Bierce's alleged execution by Villa, but the truth of his death remain mysterious to this day). When the vampires reveal themselves at the remote saloon, Bierce seems unsurprised (unlike everyone else) and continues drinking his tequila. While the vampires devour everyone else around Bierce, they don't attack him: he appears look up to the balcony above, where none other than his own doppelganger, watching the chaos unfolding below him, smiles back at Bierce. Bierce seems to be enjoying a private joke: the implication here is that Bierce is either a powerful old vampire or perhaps even the Devil himself (referencing Bierce's infamous Dictionary). While the vampires continue to feast on the saloon's patrons, Bierce joins forces with Johnny Madrid, Esmerelda, her father the Hangman and several other characters: together they try to escape through the establishment's extensive subterranean stone dungeons. After escaping, only Bierce and Madrid are left alive and they ride off to join Villa in Mexico together. After the final credits have rolled, Bierce appears last time in a short scene: he's in a bar in the present day, drinking with a random guy and is recounting own story. The guy doesn't believe him, but Bierce says he can prove it, and proceeds to tear the skeptic's heart out and eat it, revealing that he was a dark power of some kind all along (in this context, probably a vampire).

== From Dusk till Dawn: The Series ==
=== Seth Gecko ===
Seth Gecko (D. J. Cotrona) is the sane mind between the Gecko brothers, who calls himself a "professional thief" and prefers to avoid unnecessary violence. He frequently uses figure of speech and sarcasm, including when dealing with his victims. He cares for Richie and refuses to believe that his brother is crazy.

=== Richard "Richie" Gecko ===
Richard "Richie" Gecko (Zane Holtz) is a cold and mentally perturbed murderer and rapist. Richie has frequent visions that make him to commit violent crimes judged unnecessary by Seth. His visions, however, seem to have a connection with the Mayan vampires.

=== Ranger Ferdinand "Freddie" Gonzalez ===
Ranger Ferdinand "Freddie" Gonzalez (Jesse Garcia) is a Texas Ranger who, after seeing the Gecko brothers kill his mentor Earl, vows to capture them at any costs.

=== Santanico Pandemonium ===
Santanico Pandemonium (Eiza González), also known as Kisa, is a Mayan evil demigoddess and one of the vampires. She frequently appears in Richie's libidinous visions as a beautiful woman urging him to set her free and commit violent crimes, until they finally meet at the Titty Twister.

=== Jacob Fuller ===
Jacob Fuller (Robert Patrick) is a preacher who has recently lost his faith and left his congregation. Together with his daughter and adopted son, he is taken hostage by the Gecko brothers, who use his recreational vehicle to get to Mexico.

=== Kate Fuller ===
Kate Fuller / Amaru (Madison Davenport) is Jacob's teenage daughter.

=== Scott Fuller ===
Scott Fuller (Brandon Soo Hoo) is Jacob's adopted son of Chinese ethnicity.

=== Carlos Madrigal ===
Carlos Madrigal (Wilmer Valderrama) is the criminal Seth and Richie are going to meet to negotiate their entry to El Rey, who is also the leader of the vampires. His role was completely rewritten for the series.

=== Aidan "Sex Machine" Tanner ===
Aidan "Sex Machine" Tanner (Jake Busey) is a professor of archaeology specializing on Mayan culture. He goes undercover by the nickname of "Sex Machine" with a gun equipped to his crotch. Although the character Sex Machine exists in the film as a patron of the Titty Twister, his "real identity" as a professor was created for the series.

=== Lord Amancio Malvado ===
Lord Amancio Malvado is portrayed by Esai Morales.

=== The Regulator ===
The Regulator is portrayed by Danny Trejo.

=== Ranger Earl McGraw ===
Ranger Earl McGraw (Don Johnson as adult Earl and Jesse Johnson as young Earl) is Freddie's mentor who is killed by the Geckos in the first episode and is seen occasionally in flashbacks throughout the first season. Shortly before dying, he makes Freddie promise that he will capture the Geckos. His role in the series is much more significant than in the film.
