= From Dusk till Dawn (franchise) =

American media horror franchise created by Robert Kurtzman

- Directed by: Robert Rodriguez (1); Scott Spiegel (2); P. J. Pesce (3)
- Screenplay by: From Dusk till Dawn: Quentin Tarantino; Texas Blood Money: Scott Spiegel; Duane Whitaker; The Hangman's Daughter: Alvaro Rodriguez
- Story by: From Dusk till Dawn: Robert Kurtzman; Texas Blood Money: Scott Spiegel; Boaz Yakin; Quentin Tarantino; The Hangman's Daughter: Alvaro Rodriguez; Robert Rodriguez
- Produced by: Lawrence Bender; Quentin Tarantino; Robert Rodriguez; Elizabeth Avellan
- Starring: Harvey Keitel (1); George Clooney (1); Quentin Tarantino (1); Juliette Lewis (1); Ernest Liu (1); Salma Hayek (1); Danny Trejo (1–3, TV series); Robert Patrick (2); Bo Hopkins (2); Duane Whitaker (2); Muse Watson (2); Brett Harrelson (2); Raymond Cruz (2); Marco Leonardi (3); Michael Parks (3); Rebecca Gayheart (3); Lennie Loftin (3); Ara Celi (3); Jordana Spiro (3); D. J. Cotrona (TV series); Zane Holtz (TV series); Robert Patrick (TV Series); Madison Davenport (TV series); Brandon Soo Hoo (TV series); Eiza González (TV series); Wilmer Valderrama (TV series)
- Production companies: A Band Apart; Los Hooligans; Dimension Films
- Distributed by: Dimension Films (1–2); Buena Vista Home Entertainment (2–3)
- Running time: 314 minutes
- Country: United States
- Language: English
- Budget: $30 million (all films)

From Dusk till Dawn is an American media franchise created by Robert Kurtzman, including three films, a television series and a video game.

== Films ==
From Dusk till Dawn is an American horror franchise created by Robert Kurtzman, developed by writers and directors Quentin Tarantino and Robert Rodriguez. To date, it includes a motion picture, two direct-to-video sequels, a video game, a comic book, collectable statues, and a TV series.

Danny Trejo is the only actor to appear in all the original three films and the series. Actor Michael Parks appears in both From Dusk till Dawn and The Hangman's Daughter. Rodriguez, Tarantino, and Lawrence Bender served as producers on all of the three films.

=== From Dusk till Dawn ===
From Dusk Till Dawn is a 1996 horror crime action thriller film written by Quentin Tarantino and directed by Robert Rodriguez. The movie stars Harvey Keitel, George Clooney, Tarantino, and Juliette Lewis.

=== Texas Blood Money ===
From Dusk till Dawn 2: Texas Blood Money is an American horror crime action thriller released on March 16, 1999. The film was an early test release by Dimension Films for the direct-to-video market. It was co-written and directed by Scott Spiegel, the co-writer of Evil Dead II and director of Intruder. The film was filmed on location in South Africa and features cameos by Bruce Campbell and Tiffani Thiessen. It won a Saturn Award from The Academy of Science Fiction, Fantasy and Horror Films for the Best Home Video Release of 1999.

=== The Hangman's Daughter ===
From Dusk till Dawn 3: The Hangman's Daughter is a 1999 American horror film that serves as a prequel to the 1996 film, From Dusk till Dawn. It was released directly to video and was nominated for the Saturn Award's Best Home Video Release category.

=== Cancelled fourth film ===
In December 2010, the production of a fourth From Dusk till Dawn film was in the planning stages, but further work on this possibility has not been revealed. In 2013, From Dusk till Dawn: The Series, a television adaptation of the films, had begun production, without any further mention of the film.

== TV series ==
Rodriguez developed a TV series for his cable network El Rey. It stars Robert Patrick as Jacob Fuller, Eiza González as Santanico Pandemonium, and Don Johnson as Sheriff McGraw. The series debuted on El Rey in the United States on March 11, 2014, and internationally on Netflix two days later.

== Characters ==
Character	Film			Television series
Character	From Dusk till Dawn	From Dusk Till Dawn 2: Texas Blood Money	From Dusk Till Dawn 3: The Hangman's Daughter	From Dusk Till Dawn: The Series
Razor Charlie	Danny Trejo		Danny Trejo	
Santanico Pandemonium	Salma Hayek		Ara Celi	Eiza González
Earl McGraw	Michael Parks	Michael Parks		Don Johnson Jesse Johnson
Seth Gecko	George Clooney			D.J. Cotrona
Richie Gecko	Quentin Tarantino			Zane Holtz
Jacob Fuller	Harvey Keitel			Robert Patrick
Kate Fuller	Juliette Lewis			Madison Davenport
Razor Eddie		Danny Trejo		
Edgar McGraw		James Parks		
Ambrose Bierce			Michael Parks	
The Hangman			Temuera Morrison	
The Regulator				Danny Trejo

== Video game ==
From Dusk till Dawn is a third-person shooter that is based on events that transpire directly after the end of the film From Dusk till Dawn. Released in 2001 for Windows, it was distributed by Cryo Interactive.
