= From Dusk till Dawn (disambiguation) =

From Dusk till Dawn is a 1996 American horror film written by Quentin Tarantino and directed by Robert Rodriguez.

From Dusk till Dawn may also refer to:

- From Dusk till Dawn (franchise), a media franchise
- From Dusk Till Dawn (soundtrack)
- From Dusk Till Dawn (video game)
- From Dusk 'til Dawn (book), a 2007 book by Keith Mann
- From Dusk till Dawn: The Series
- From Dusk 'til Dawn, a 2009 album by Sass Jordan
- "From Dusk Till Dawn", a song by Babymetal on the 2016 album Metal Resistance

== See also ==
- Dusk Till Dawn (disambiguation)
- Dawn to Dusk (disambiguation)
