= From Dusk Till Dawn 3: The Hangman's Daughter =

1999 horror film

- Poster for From Dusk Till Dawn 3: The Hangman's Daughter
- Directed by: P. J. Pesce
- Screenplay by: Álvaro Rodríguez
- Story by: Álvaro Rodríguez; Robert Rodríguez
- Produced by: Michael S. Murphey; Gianni Nunnari; Meir Teper
- Starring: Marco Leonardi; Michael Parks; Rebecca Gayheart; Lennie Loftin; Ara Celi; Jordana Spiro; Orlando Jones; Danny Trejo; Temuera Morrison; Sônia Braga
- Cinematography: Michael Bonvillain
- Edited by: Lawrence A. Maddox
- Music by: Nathan Barr
- Production companies: Dimension Films; A Band Apart; Los Hooligans Productions
- Distributed by: Amuse Pictures; Buena Vista Home Video; New Films International
- Release dates: October 31, 1999 (Fort Lauderdale International Film Festival); January 18, 2000 (United States)
- Running time: 93 minutes
- Country: United States
- Language: English

From Dusk Till Dawn 3: The Hangman's Daughter is a 1999 American horror Western film directed by P. J. Pesce. It serves as a prequel to the 1996 film From Dusk till Dawn. It was released directly to video and was nominated at the 26th Saturn Awards for "Best Home Video Release". In late 2010, the production of a fourth film in the series was discussed, but, as of August 2012, further work on this possibility has not been revealed. A TV series adaptation was released in 2014.

== Plot ==
In 1913 Mexico, American author Ambrose Bierce experiences a nightmare in which he is killed by Pancho Villa. (Note: In reality, Bierce disappeared after claiming he was traveling to Mexico to report on the ongoing revolution.) Bierce wakes and talks to a local bartender about his intentions to join Villa's revolutionary army. He joins a stagecoach transporting a newlywed couple, John and Mary Newlie, who are traveling to Mexico to preach Christianity. Meanwhile, outlaw Johnny Madrid escapes from the gallows and kidnaps his hangman Mauricio's 19-year-old daughter Esmeralda. Madrid receives assistance from the young Catherine Reece, who wants to become Madrid's apprentice as an outlaw. Madrid meets with his gang with Mauricio and a posse on their trail. They later rob Bierce's stagecoach because of Reece's belief that Bierce possesses an invaluable object. The gang does not find anything of value, with Bierce claiming he is the invaluable object, intending to join Villa. An annoyed Madrid leaves Reece hanging in the desert. The posse finds her, using her to track the two.

As night falls, all the parties coincidentally seek shelter in La Tetilla Del Diablo, (Note: The Titty Twister from the first film.) an isolated inn that also serves as a brothel. They meet Ezra Traylor, a businessman heading to the U.S. Mauricio is the only one who knows that vampires run the establishment, led by high priestess Quixtla, who is immediately drawn to Esmeralda. As night falls, John gets into a fight with one of Madrid's men, drawing blood. The vampires reveal themselves, lock the exit and attack the patrons, killing all of Mauricio's men and the remnants of Madrid's gang except for Joaquin and Madrid. Vampire women overcome and feed on Ezra, who becomes a vampire. He grabs, hypnotizes and bites Mary. Madrid, Bierce, Reece, John, Esmeralda, Mauricio, and Joaquin escape into the dungeons beneath the building and try to work together to find a way out.

Mary rises as a vampire and goes after the group, revealing that John is a fraud who only married her for her father's money. John eventually kills her. Joaquin, who escaped with them, hides a bite he received from a prostitute earlier. As they continue through the catacombs, he turns and bites John, who kills Joaquin. Doomed, John persuades Madrid to stake him, preventing him from turning. As the remaining survivors keep going, Bierce admits to reading in the papers that Reece is an outlaw who killed her entire family. The group ends up back at the bar entrance, only to find Quixtla and the vampires waiting for them. She reveals that Esmeralda is the dhampir daughter of Quixtla and Mauricio and will become a full-fledged vampire princess. Mauricio took her away, hoping to raise her as a normal human, and tried to kill her unsuccessfully. Thanks to his mistreatment and Madrid's kidnapping, she has been led back to Quixtla.

Madrid, Mauricio, Bierce, and Reece are hung upside-down to be fed on later as Quixtla and Esmeralda's vampire grandmother transform Esmeralda into a vampire princess, renaming her Santánico Pandemonium. Madrid breaks from his bonds and frees the others. Reece is bitten in the scuffle while Madrid kills Ezra. Santánico kills her grandmother, then bites and turns her father into a vampire, but he opens the entranceway and kills Quixtla with sunlight before the change finishes, allowing Madrid and Bierce to escape while Santánico hides. Santánico screams for Madrid not to leave her as the entrance closes. Madrid looks away sadly and joins Ambrose's quest to join Villa's army. The two leave, not noticing the Mayan temple behind the vampires' building.

Bierce survives into current times and tells a patron his story. While leaving, Ambrose says that he has proof. He then reveals that Quixtla actually bit him as they fell outside the bar because he is now a vampire. He then rips the patron's heart out and bites it.

== Cast ==
- Marco Leonardi as Johnny Madrid
- Michael Parks as Ambrose Bierce
- Ara Celi as Esmeralda/Santánico Pandemonium
- Sônia Braga as Quixtla
- Rebecca Gayheart as Mary Newlie
- Orlando Jones as Ezra Traylor
- Temuera Morrison as Mauricio/The Hangman
- Lennie Loftin as John Newlie
- Danny Trejo as Charlie 'Razor Charlie'
- Jordana Spiro as Catherine Reece
- Danny Keogh as Bartender
- Peter Butler as Pancho Villa
- Melissa Gilbert as Wedding Dress Whore
- P. J. Pesce as Man in Bar

== Production ==
From Dusk Till Dawn 2: Texas Blood Money and From Dusk Till Dawn 3: The Hangman's Daughter were produced at the same time as one another with Robert Rodríguez and his cousin Álvaro Rodríguez shepherding their own prequel pitch which would serve as the basis for From Dusk Till Dawn 3, while Quentin Tarantino, Lawrence Bender, and Scott Spiegel produced their own sequel pitch which would become From Dusk Till Dawn 2. Both films were shot back-to-back in order to share costs and filming resources between the productions and get two movies for the price of one. During production, the producers briefly considered giving The Hangman's Daughter a theatrical release.

Robert Rodriguez approached P. J. Pesce about directing his prequel script for From Dusk till Dawn in 1997 after having been impressed by Pesce's film The Desperate Trail. The first actor cast in the film was Michael Parks as Ambrose Bierce with both Pesce and Rodriguez agreeing he was right for the role. Like the second film, From Dusk Till Dawn 3 was filmed in Cape Town, South Africa which proved problematic for some of the scenes tailored to the film's western genre. Due to the fact there were no horses in Africa trained to pull wagons, the film's wrangler had to train 12 horses to do so and the only stagecoach the crew could get was a prop from a local western themed steakhouse that had to be heavily modified to keep from falling apart.

== Release ==
The American Cinematheque held the West Coast premiere at Grauman's Egyptian Theatre on October 30, 1999.

== Reception ==
Rotten Tomatoes, a review aggregator, reports that 22% of nine surveyed critics gave the film a positive review; the average rating was 5.3/10. Mike Emery of the Houston Chronicle wrote that the film "isn't terribly bad" but is too derivative and only for gore hounds. Matt Serafini of Dread Central rated it 2/5 stars and wrote that the original film should not have had any sequels. Nathan Rabin of The A.V. Club wrote: "Being competent is no great achievement, but for undiscriminating gore fans, it should be enough to make Dawn 3 a passable evening's entertainment". G. Noel Cross of DVD Talk rated it 4/5 stars and called it "a smart sequel that delivers mucho bang for the peso". Gordon Sullivan of DVD Verdict called it "a serviceable little action horror flick that takes a timeworn premise and adds its own small filigrees".

== See also ==
- Vampire film
