= Full Tilt Boogie =

Full-Tilt Boogie
- Directed by: Sarah Kelly
- Produced by: Rana Joy Glickman
- Starring: Lawrence Bender; George Clooney; Harvey Keitel; Juliette Lewis; Robert Rodriguez; Quentin Tarantino
- Cinematography: Christopher Gallo
- Edited by: Lauren Zuckerman
- Music by: Cary Berger; Dominic Kelly
- Distributed by: Miramax Films
- Release date: 1997
- Running time: 97 minutes
- Country: United States
- Language: English

Full-Tilt Boogie is a 1997 documentary film directed by Sarah Kelly that chronicles the production of the 1996 film From Dusk till Dawn.

It features extensive interviews with the cast and crew covering a variety of topics related to the film. This includes the International Alliance of Theatrical Stage Employees protesting the non-union status of the film. The production crew for the documentary are also non-union.

== Cast ==
- Robert Rodriguez
- Quentin Tarantino
- Lawrence Bender
- George Clooney
- Harvey Keitel
- Juliette Lewis
- Salma Hayek
- Fred Williamson
- Tom Savini
- Michael Parks
- Elizabeth Avellán
- Robert Kurtzman
- Gregory Nicotero

== Poster ==
When the time came for the poster of From Dusk till Dawn to be created, Rodriguez, who has final approval for all such merchandise relating to his films, commissioned a design from one of his favorite artists, fantasy painter Frank Frazetta. The piece was ultimately not used, but its influence can clearly be seen on the poster for Full Tilt Boogie.

== Reception ==
Despite being released two years after its subject – the popular film From Dusk till Dawn – Full-Tilt Boogie was well received, with an 88% on review aggregation website Rotten Tomatoes. David Stratton of Variety Film Reviews remarked, "A bit late in the day, but nevertheless welcome."

It was praised by Ryan Cracknell of the Apollo Guide for being "a tribute to the people who work behind the camera, but don't normally compete for golden statues on Oscar night."
