= Saturn Award for Best Supporting Actor =

Annual US film award

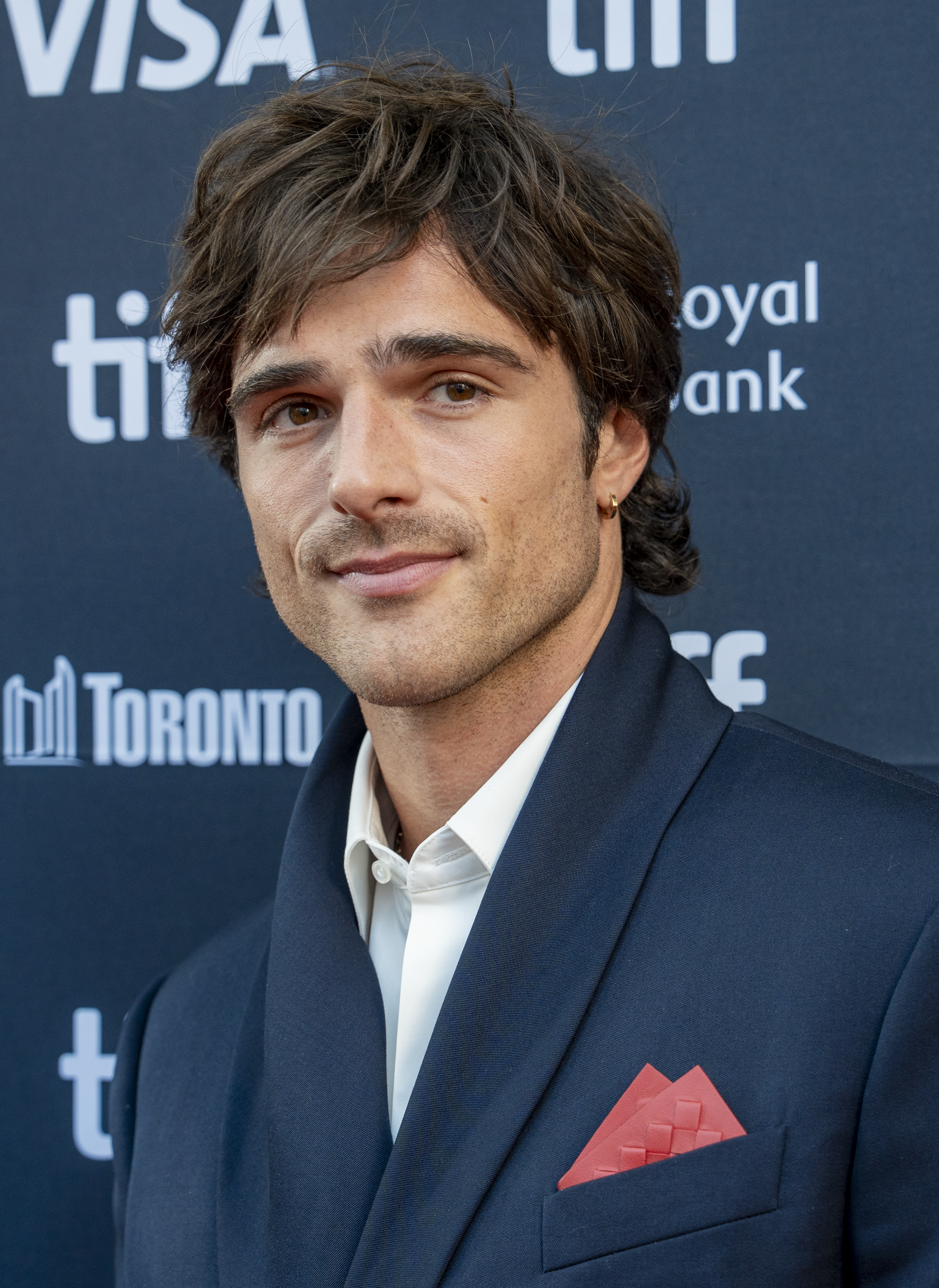
- Awarded for: Best performance of the year by a male in a supporting role in a genre film
- Country: United States
- Presented by: Academy of Science Fiction, Fantasy and Horror Films
- First award: 1974/75
- Currently held by: Jacob Elordi for Frankenstein (2024/2025)
- Website: www.saturnawards.org

The following is a list of Saturn Award winners and nominees for Best Supporting Actor (in a film). Burgess Meredith, Ian McKellen and Andy Serkis are the only actors that have won the award twice, while only Javier Bardem, Heath Ledger, and Ke Huy Quan have won both the Saturn Award and the Academy Award for Best Supporting Actor for the same performance.

== Winners and nominees ==
=== 1970s ===
Year	Actor	Motion Picture	Character
1974/1975 (3rd)	Marty Feldman	Young Frankenstein	Igor
1976 (4th)	Jay Robinson	Train Ride to Hollywood	Dracula
1977 (5th)	Alec Guinness	Star Wars	Obi-Wan "Ben" Kenobi
1977 (5th)	Red Buttons	Pete's Dragon	Hoagy
1977 (5th)	Peter Cushing	Star Wars	Grand Moff Tarkin
1977 (5th)	Burgess Meredith	The Sentinel	Charles Chazen
1977 (5th)	Woody Strode	Kingdom of the Spiders	Walter Colby
1978 (6th)	Burgess Meredith	Magic	Ben Greene
1978 (6th)	Michael Ansara	The Manitou	John Singing Rock
1978 (6th)	Michael Jackson	The Wiz	Scarecrow
1978 (6th)	James Mason	Heaven Can Wait	Mr. Jordan
1978 (6th)	Leonard Nimoy	Invasion of the Body Snatchers	Dr. David Kibner
1979 (7th)	Arte Johnson	Love at First Bite	Renfield
1979 (7th)	Richard Kiel	Moonraker	Jaws
1979 (7th)	Leonard Nimoy	Star Trek: The Motion Picture	Spock
1979 (7th)	Donald Pleasence	Dracula	Dr. Jack Seward
1979 (7th)	David Warner	Time After Time	John Leslie Stevenson/Jack the Ripper

=== 1980s ===
Year	Actor	Motion Picture	Character
1980 (8th)	Scatman Crothers	The Shining	Dick Hallorann
1980 (8th)	Melvyn Douglas	The Changeling	Senator Joseph Carmichael
1980 (8th)	Martin Gabel	The First Deadly Sin	Christopher Langley
1980 (8th)	Max von Sydow	Flash Gordon	The Emperor Ming
1980 (8th)	Billy Dee Williams	The Empire Strikes Back	Lando Calrissian
1981 (9th)	Burgess Meredith	Clash of the Titans	Ammon
1981 (9th)	Paul Freeman	Raiders of the Lost Ark	Dr. René Belloq
1981 (9th)	Ralph Richardson	Dragonslayer	Ulrich of Craggenmoor
1981 (9th)	Craig Warnock	Time Bandits	Kevin
1981 (9th)	Nicol Williamson	Excalibur	Merlin
1982 (10th)	Richard Lynch	The Sword and the Sorcerer	Titus Cromwell
1982 (10th)	Rutger Hauer	Blade Runner	Roy Batty
1982 (10th)	Walter Koenig	Star Trek II: The Wrath of Khan	Pavel Chekov
1982 (10th)	Roddy McDowall	Class of 1984	Terry Corrigan
1982 (10th)	Bruce Spence	Mad Max 2	The Gyro Captain
1983 (11th)	John Lithgow	Twilight Zone: The Movie (Segment #4)	John Valentine
1983 (11th)	Scatman Crothers	Twilight Zone: The Movie (Segment #2)	Mr. Bloom
1983 (11th)	Jonathan Pryce	Something Wicked This Way Comes	Mr. Dark
1983 (11th)	Billy Dee Williams	Return of the Jedi	Lando Calrissian
1983 (11th)	John Wood	WarGames	Dr. Stephen Falken
1984 (12th)	Tracey Walter	Repo Man	Miller
1984 (12th)	John Candy	Splash	Freddie Bauer
1984 (12th)	John Lithgow	The Adventures of Buckaroo Banzai Across the 8th Dimension	Dr. Emilio Lizardo / Lord John Whorfin
1984 (12th)	Dick Miller	Gremlins	Murray Futterman
1984 (12th)	Robert Preston	The Last Starfighter	Centauri
1985 (13th)	Roddy McDowall	Fright Night	Peter Vincent
1985 (13th)	Crispin Glover	Back to the Future	George McFly
1985 (13th)	Joel Grey	Remo Williams: The Adventure Begins	Chiun
1985 (13th)	Ian Holm	Dreamchild	Charles L. Dodgson / Lewis Carroll
1985 (13th)	Christopher Lloyd	Back to the Future	Dr. Emmett Brown
1986 (14th)	Bill Paxton	Aliens	Pvt. William Hudson
1986 (14th)	James Doohan	Star Trek IV: The Voyage Home	Scotty
1986 (14th)	Clu Gulager	Hunter's Blood	Mason Rand
1986 (14th)	Walter Koenig	Star Trek IV: The Voyage Home	Pavel Chekov
1986 (14th)	Richard Moll	House	Big Ben
1987 (15th)	Richard Dawson	The Running Man	Damon Killian
1987 (15th)	Robert De Niro	Angel Heart	Louis Cyphre
1987 (15th)	Robert Englund	A Nightmare on Elm Street 3: Dream Warriors	Freddy Krueger
1987 (15th)	Barnard Hughes	The Lost Boys	Grandpa
1987 (15th)	Bill Paxton	Near Dark	Severen
1987 (15th)	Duncan Regehr	The Monster Squad	Count Dracula
1988 (16th)	Robert Loggia	Big	Mr. MacMillan
1988 (16th)	Robert Englund	A Nightmare on Elm Street 4: The Dream Master	Freddy Krueger
1988 (16th)	Jack Gilford	Cocoon: The Return	Bernie Lefkowitz
1988 (16th)	Michael Keaton	Beetlejuice	Betelgeuse
1988 (16th)	Christopher Lloyd	Who Framed Roger Rabbit	Judge Doom
1988 (16th)	Mandy Patinkin	Alien Nation	Det. Samuel 'George' Francisco
1989/1990 (17th)	Thomas F. Wilson	Back to the Future Part III	Buford "Mad Dog" Tannen / Biff Tannen
1989/1990 (17th)	Jeffrey Combs	Bride of Re-Animator	Dr. Herbert West
1989/1990 (17th)	Brad Dourif	The Exorcist III	The Gemini Killer
1989/1990 (17th)	Larry Drake	Darkman	Robert G. Durant
1989/1990 (17th)	John Glover	Gremlins 2: The New Batch	Daniel Clamp
1989/1990 (17th)	Tony Goldwyn	Ghost	Carl Bruner
1989/1990 (17th)	John Goodman	Arachnophobia	Delbert McClintock
1989/1990 (17th)	Al Pacino	Dick Tracy	Alphonse "Big Boy" Caprice
1989/1990 (17th)	Robert Picardo	Gremlins 2: The New Batch	Forster

=== 1990s ===
Year	Actor	Motion Picture	Character
1991 (18th)	William Sadler	Bill & Ted's Bogus Journey	Grim Reaper
1991 (18th)	Alan Arkin	Edward Scissorhands	Bill Boggs
1991 (18th)	Patrick Bergin	Sleeping with the Enemy	Martin Burney
1991 (18th)	Wayne Newton	The Dark Backward	Jackie Chrome
1991 (18th)	Robert Patrick	Terminator 2: Judgment Day	T-1000
1991 (18th)	Alan Rickman	Robin Hood: Prince of Thieves	Sheriff George of Nottingham
1992 (19th)	Robin Williams	Aladdin	Genie (voice)
1992 (19th)	Danny DeVito	Batman Returns	Oswald Cobblepot / Penguin
1992 (19th)	Charles S. Dutton	Alien 3	Leonard Dillon
1992 (19th)	Anthony Hopkins	Bram Stoker's Dracula	Abraham Van Helsing
1992 (19th)	Sam Neill	Memoirs of an Invisible Man	David Jenkins
1992 (19th)	Kevin Spacey	Consenting Adults	Eddy Otis
1992 (19th)	Ray Wise	Twin Peaks: Fire Walk with Me	Leland Palmer
1993 (20th)	Lance Henriksen	Hard Target	Emil Fouchon
1993 (20th)	Jeff Goldblum	Jurassic Park	Dr. Ian Malcolm
1993 (20th)	Charles Grodin	Heart and Souls	Harrison Winslow
1993 (20th)	Wayne Knight	Jurassic Park	Dennis Nedry
1993 (20th)	John Malkovich	In the Line of Fire	Mitch Leary
1993 (20th)	Tom Sizemore	Heart and Souls	Milo Peck
1993 (20th)	J. T. Walsh	Needful Things	Danforth "Buster" Keeton III
1994 (21st)	Gary Sinise	Forrest Gump	Lieutenant Dan Taylor
1994 (21st)	Richard Attenborough	Miracle on 34th Street	Kris Kringle
1994 (21st)	Robert De Niro	Mary Shelley’s Frankenstein	The Creature
1994 (21st)	Raúl Juliá (posthumously)	Street Fighter	General M. Bison
1994 (21st)	Bill Paxton	True Lies	Simon
1994 (21st)	James Spader	Wolf	Stewart Swinton
1995 (22nd)	Brad Pitt	12 Monkeys	Jeffrey Goines
1995 (22nd)	Harvey Keitel	From Dusk till Dawn	Jacob Fuller
1995 (22nd)	Val Kilmer	Heat	Chris Shiherlis
1995 (22nd)	Tim Roth	Rob Roy	Archibald Cunningham
1995 (22nd)	Quentin Tarantino	From Dusk till Dawn	Richie Gecko
1995 (22nd)	Christopher Walken	The Prophecy	Gabriel
1996 (23rd)	Brent Spiner	Star Trek: First Contact	Lt. Commander Data
1996 (23rd)	Jeffrey Combs	The Frighteners	Milton Dammers
1996 (23rd)	Edward Norton	Primal Fear	Aaron Stampler
1996 (23rd)	Joe Pantoliano	Bound	Caesar
1996 (23rd)	Brent Spiner	Independence Day	Dr. Brackish Okun
1996 (23rd)	Skeet Ulrich	Scream	Billy Loomis
1997 (24th)	Vincent D'Onofrio	Men in Black	Edgar / Bug
1997 (24th)	Steve Buscemi	Con Air	Garland "The Marietta Mangler" Greene
1997 (24th)	Robert Forster	Jackie Brown	Max Cherry
1997 (24th)	Will Patton	The Postman	General Bethlehem
1997 (24th)	Pete Postlethwaite	The Lost World: Jurassic Park	Roland Tembo
1997 (24th)	J. T. Walsh	Breakdown	Warren "Red" Barr
1998 (25th)	Ian McKellen	Apt Pupil	Kurt Dussander / Arthur Denker
1998 (25th)	Ben Affleck	Armageddon	A. J. Frost
1998 (25th)	Dennis Franz	City of Angels	Nathaniel Messinger
1998 (25th)	Ed Harris	The Truman Show	Christof
1998 (25th)	Gary Oldman	Lost in Space	Dr. Zachary Smith / Spider Smith
1998 (25th)	Billy Bob Thornton	A Simple Plan	Jacob Mitchell
1999 (26th)	Michael Clarke Duncan	The Green Mile	John Coffey
1999 (26th)	Laurence Fishburne	The Matrix	Morpheus
1999 (26th)	Jude Law	The Talented Mr. Ripley	Dickie Greenleaf
1999 (26th)	Ewan McGregor	Star Wars: Episode I – The Phantom Menace	Obi-Wan Kenobi
1999 (26th)	Alan Rickman	Galaxy Quest	Alexander Dane/Dr. Lazarus
1999 (26th)	Christopher Walken	Sleepy Hollow	Hessian Horseman

=== 2000s ===
Year	Actor	Motion Picture	Character
2000 (27th)	Willem Dafoe	Shadow of the Vampire	Max Schreck
2000 (27th)	Jason Alexander	The Adventures of Rocky and Bullwinkle	Boris Badenov
2000 (27th)	Dennis Quaid	Frequency	Frank Sullivan
2000 (27th)	Giovanni Ribisi	The Gift	Buddy Cole
2000 (27th)	Will Smith	The Legend of Bagger Vance	Bagger Vance
2000 (27th)	Patrick Stewart	X-Men	Professor Charles Xavier
2001 (28th)	Ian McKellen	The Lord of the Rings: The Fellowship of the Ring	Gandalf the Grey
2001 (28th)	Robbie Coltrane	Harry Potter and the Philosopher's Stone	Rubeus Hagrid
2001 (28th)	Mark Dacascos	Brotherhood of the Wolf	Mani
2001 (28th)	Eddie Murphy	Shrek	Donkey (voice)
2001 (28th)	Jeremy Piven	Serendipity	Dean Kansky
2001 (28th)	Tim Roth	Planet of the Apes	General Thade
2002 (29th)	Andy Serkis	The Lord of the Rings: The Two Towers	Sméagol / Gollum
2002 (29th)	Ralph Fiennes	Red Dragon	Francis Dolarhyde
2002 (29th)	Tom Hardy	Star Trek: Nemesis	Praetor Shinzon
2002 (29th)	Toby Stephens	Die Another Day	Gustav Graves
2002 (29th)	Max von Sydow	Minority Report	Director Lamar Burgess
2002 (29th)	Robin Williams	Insomnia	Walter Finch
2003 (30th)	Sean Astin	The Lord of the Rings: The Return of the King	Samwise Gamgee
2003 (30th)	Sonny Chiba	Kill Bill: Volume 1	Hattori Hanzō
2003 (30th)	Ian McKellen	The Lord of the Rings: The Return of the King	Gandalf the White
2003 (30th)	Geoffrey Rush	Pirates of the Caribbean: The Curse of the Black Pearl	Captain Hector Barbossa
2003 (30th)	Andy Serkis	The Lord of the Rings: The Return of the King	Smeagol / Gollum
2003 (30th)	Ken Watanabe	The Last Samurai	Katsumoto Moritsugu
2004 (31st)	David Carradine	Kill Bill: Volume 2	Bill
2004 (31st)	Alfred Molina	Spider-Man 2	Otto Octavius / Doctor Octopus
2004 (31st)	Gary Oldman	Harry Potter and the Prisoner of Azkaban	Sirius Black
2004 (31st)	Giovanni Ribisi	Sky Captain and the World of Tomorrow	Dex
2004 (31st)	Liev Schreiber	The Manchurian Candidate	Raymond Shaw
2004 (31st)	John Turturro	Secret Window	John Shooter
2005 (32nd)	Mickey Rourke	Sin City	Marv
2005 (32nd)	William Hurt	A History of Violence	Richie Cusack
2005 (32nd)	Val Kilmer	Kiss Kiss Bang Bang	Gay Perry
2005 (32nd)	Ian McDiarmid	Star Wars: Episode III – Revenge of the Sith	Chancellor Palpatine / Darth Sidious
2005 (32nd)	Cillian Murphy	Red Eye	Jackson Rippner
2005 (32nd)	Liam Neeson	Batman Begins	Henri Ducard / Ra's al Ghul
2006 (33rd)	Ben Affleck	Hollywoodland	George Reeves
2006 (33rd)	Kelsey Grammer	X-Men: The Last Stand	Dr. Hank McCoy / Beast
2006 (33rd)	Philip Seymour Hoffman	Mission: Impossible III	Owen Davian
2006 (33rd)	Sergi López	Pan's Labyrinth	Captain Vidal
2006 (33rd)	James Marsden	Superman Returns	Richard White
2006 (33rd)	Bill Nighy	Pirates of the Caribbean: Dead Man's Chest	Davy Jones
2007 (34th)	Javier Bardem	No Country for Old Men	Anton Chigurh
2007 (34th)	Ben Foster	3:10 to Yuma	Charlie Prince
2007 (34th)	James Franco	Spider-Man 3	Harry Osborn / New Goblin
2007 (34th)	Justin Long	Live Free or Die Hard	Matthew "Matt" Farrell
2007 (34th)	Alan Rickman	Sweeney Todd: The Demon Barber of Fleet Street	Judge Turpin
2007 (34th)	David Wenham	300	Dilios
2008 (35th)	Heath Ledger (posthumously)	The Dark Knight	The Joker
2008 (35th)	Jeff Bridges	Iron Man	Obadiah Stane
2008 (35th)	Aaron Eckhart	The Dark Knight	Harvey Dent / Two-Face
2008 (35th)	Woody Harrelson	Transsiberian	Roy
2008 (35th)	Shia LaBeouf	Indiana Jones and the Kingdom of the Crystal Skull	Mutt Williams
2008 (35th)	Bill Nighy	Valkyrie	General Friedrich Olbricht
2009 (36th)	Stephen Lang	Avatar	Colonel Miles Quaritch
2009 (36th)	Woody Harrelson	Zombieland	Tallahassee
2009 (36th)	Frank Langella	The Box	Arlington Steward
2009 (36th)	Jude Law	Sherlock Holmes	Dr. John Watson
2009 (36th)	Stanley Tucci	The Lovely Bones	George Harvey
2009 (36th)	Christoph Waltz	Inglourious Basterds	Colonel Hans Landa

=== 2010s ===
Year	Actor	Motion Picture	Character
2010 (37th)	Andrew Garfield	Never Let Me Go	Tommy D
2010 (37th)	Christian Bale	The Fighter	Dicky Eklund
2010 (37th)	Tom Hardy	Inception	Eames
2010 (37th)	Garrett Hedlund	Tron: Legacy	Sam Flynn
2010 (37th)	John Malkovich	Red	Marvin Boggs
2010 (37th)	Mark Ruffalo	Shutter Island	Chuck Aule / Dr. Lester Sheehan
2011 (38th)	Andy Serkis	Rise of the Planet of the Apes	Caesar
2011 (38th)	Ralph Fiennes	Harry Potter and the Deathly Hallows – Part 2	Lord Voldemort
2011 (38th)	Harrison Ford	Cowboys & Aliens	Colonel Woodrow Dolarhyde
2011 (38th)	Tom Hiddleston	Thor	Loki
2011 (38th)	Alan Rickman	Harry Potter and the Deathly Hallows – Part 2	Severus Snape
2011 (38th)	Stanley Tucci	Captain America: The First Avenger	Dr. Abraham Erskine
2012 (39th)	Clark Gregg	The Avengers	Agent Phil Coulson
2012 (39th)	Javier Bardem	Skyfall	Raoul Silva
2012 (39th)	Michael Fassbender	Prometheus	David 8
2012 (39th)	Joseph Gordon-Levitt	The Dark Knight Rises	John Blake
2012 (39th)	Ian McKellen	The Hobbit: An Unexpected Journey	Gandalf the Grey
2012 (39th)	Christoph Waltz	Django Unchained	Dr. King Schultz
2013 (40th)	Ben Kingsley	Iron Man 3	Trevor Slattery
2013 (40th)	Daniel Brühl	Rush	Niki Lauda
2013 (40th)	George Clooney	Gravity	Matt Kowalski
2013 (40th)	Benedict Cumberbatch	Star Trek Into Darkness	John Harrison / Khan
2013 (40th)	Harrison Ford	Ender's Game	Colonel Hyrum Graff
2013 (40th)	Tom Hiddleston	Thor: The Dark World	Loki
2013 (40th)	Bill Nighy	About Time	James Lake
2014 (41st)	Richard Armitage	The Hobbit: The Battle of the Five Armies	Thorin Oakenshield
2014 (41st)	Josh Brolin	Inherent Vice	Det. Christian F. "Bigfoot" Bjornsen
2014 (41st)	Samuel L. Jackson	Captain America: The Winter Soldier	Nick Fury
2014 (41st)	Anthony Mackie	Captain America: The Winter Soldier	Sam Wilson / Falcon
2014 (41st)	Andy Serkis	Dawn of the Planet of the Apes	Caesar
2014 (41st)	J. K. Simmons	Whiplash	Terence Fletcher
2015 (42nd)	Adam Driver	Star Wars: The Force Awakens	Kylo Ren
2015 (42nd)	Paul Bettany	Avengers: Age of Ultron	J.A.R.V.I.S. and Vision
2015 (42nd)	Michael Douglas	Ant-Man	Hank Pym
2015 (42nd)	Walton Goggins	The Hateful Eight	Sheriff Chris Mannix
2015 (42nd)	Simon Pegg	Mission: Impossible – Rogue Nation	Benji Dunn
2015 (42nd)	Michael Shannon	99 Homes	Rick Carver
2016 (43rd)	John Goodman	10 Cloverfield Lane	Howard Stambler
2016 (43rd)	Chadwick Boseman	Captain America: Civil War	T'Challa / Black Panther
2016 (43rd)	Dan Fogler	Fantastic Beasts and Where to Find Them	Jacob Kowalski
2016 (43rd)	Diego Luna	Rogue One: A Star Wars Story	Cassian Andor
2016 (43rd)	Zachary Quinto	Star Trek Beyond	Commander Spock
2016 (43rd)	Christopher Walken	The Jungle Book	King Louie (voice)
2017 (44th)	Patrick Stewart	Logan	Charles Xavier / Professor X
2017 (44th)	Harrison Ford	Blade Runner 2049	Rick Deckard
2017 (44th)	Michael B. Jordan	Black Panther	N'Jadaka / Erik "Killmonger" Stevens
2017 (44th)	Michael Keaton	Spider-Man: Homecoming	Adrian Toomes / Vulture
2017 (44th)	Chris Pine	Wonder Woman	Steve Trevor
2017 (44th)	Michael Rooker	Guardians of the Galaxy Vol. 2	Yondu
2017 (44th)	Bill Skarsgård	It	It / Pennywise the Dancing Clown
2018/2019 (45th)	Josh Brolin	Avengers: Infinity War	Thanos
2018/2019 (45th)	John Lithgow	Pet Sematary	Jud Crandall
2018/2019 (45th)	Lin-Manuel Miranda	Mary Poppins Returns	Jack
2018/2019 (45th)	Lewis Pullman	Bad Times at the El Royale	Miles Miller
2018/2019 (45th)	Jeremy Renner	Avengers: Endgame	Clint Barton / Hawkeye
2018/2019 (45th)	Will Smith	Aladdin	Genie
2018/2019 (45th)	Steven Yeun	Burning	Ben
2019/2020 (46th)	Bill Hader	It Chapter Two	Richard "Richie" Tozier
2019/2020 (46th)	Adam Driver	Star Wars: The Rise of Skywalker	Kylo Ren
2019/2020 (46th)	Chris Evans	Knives Out	Hugh Ransom Drysdale
2019/2020 (46th)	Ian McDiarmid	Star Wars: The Rise of Skywalker	Emperor Palpatine
2019/2020 (46th)	Robert Pattinson	Tenet	Neil
2019/2020 (46th)	Donnie Yen	Mulan	Commander Tung

=== 2020s ===
Year	Actor	Motion Picture	Character
2021/2022 (50th)	Ke Huy Quan	Everything Everywhere All at Once	Waymond Wang
2021/2022 (50th)	Paul Dano	The Batman	Edward Nashton / Riddler
2021/2022 (50th)	Colin Farrell	The Batman	Oswald "Oz" Cobb / Penguin
2021/2022 (50th)	Ethan Hawke	The Black Phone	The Grabber
2021/2022 (50th)	Richard Jenkins	Nightmare Alley	Ezra Grindle
2021/2022 (50th)	Alfred Molina	Spider-Man: No Way Home	Otto Octavius / Doctor Octopus
2021/2022 (50th)	Benedict Wong	Doctor Strange in the Multiverse of Madness	Wong
2022/2023 (51st)	Nicolas Cage	Renfield	Dracula
2022/2023 (51st)	Robert Downey Jr.	Oppenheimer	Lewis Strauss
2022/2023 (51st)	Ryan Gosling	Barbie	Ken
2022/2023 (51st)	Michael Keaton	The Flash	Bruce Wayne / Batman
2022/2023 (51st)	Stephen Lang	Avatar: The Way of Water	Miles Quaritch
2022/2023 (51st)	Mads Mikkelsen	Indiana Jones and the Dial of Destiny	Jürgen Voller
2023/2024 (52nd)	Hugh Jackman	Deadpool & Wolverine	James "Logan" Howlett / Wolverine
2023/2024 (52nd)	Josh Brolin	Dune: Part Two	Gurney Halleck
2023/2024 (52nd)	Austin Butler	Dune: Part Two	Feyd-Rautha Harkonnen
2023/2024 (52nd)	Nicolas Cage	Longlegs	Dale Kobble / Longlegs
2023/2024 (52nd)	Willem Dafoe	Beetlejuice Beetlejuice	Wolf Jackson
2023/2024 (52nd)	David Jonsson	Alien: Romulus	Andy Carradine
2023/2024 (52nd)	Owen Teague	Kingdom of the Planet of the Apes	Noa
2024/2025 (53rd)	Jacob Elordi	Frankenstein	The Creature
2024/2025 (53rd)	Edi Gathegi	Superman	Michael Holt / Mister Terrific
2024/2025 (53rd)	Jeff Goldblum	Wicked: For Good	The Wonderful Wizard of Oz
2024/2025 (53rd)	Stephen Lang	Avatar: Fire and Ash	Miles Quaritch
2024/2025 (53rd)	Delroy Lindo	Sinners	Delta Slim
2024/2025 (53rd)	Mads Mikkelsen	Dust Bunny	Resident 5B
2024/2025 (53rd)	Ebon Moss-Bachrach	The Fantastic Four: First Steps	Ben Grimm / The Thing

== Multiple nominations ==
4 nominations

- Ian McKellen
- Alan Rickman
- Andy Serkis

3 nominations

- Josh Brolin
- Harrison Ford
- Stephen Lang
- John Lithgow
- Burgess Meredith
- Bill Nighy
- Bill Paxton
- Christopher Walken

2 nominations

- Javier Bardem
- Nicolas Cage
- Jeffrey Combs
- Scatman Crothers
- Willem Dafoe
- Robert De Niro
- Adam Driver
- Robert Englund
- Ralph Fiennes
- Jeff Goldblum
- John Goodman
- Tom Hardy
- Woody Harrelson
- Tom Hiddleston
- Michael Keaton
- Val Kilmer
- Walter Koenig
- Frank Langella
- Jude Law
- Christopher Lloyd
- John Malkovich
- Ian McDiarmid
- Roddy McDowall
- Mads Mikkelsen
- Alfred Molina
- Leonard Nimoy
- Gary Oldman
- Giovanni Ribisi
- Tim Roth
- Will Smith
- Brent Spiner
- Patrick Stewart
- Max von Sydow
- Stanley Tucci
- J.T. Walsh
- Christoph Waltz
- Billy Dee Williams
- Robin Williams

== Multiple wins ==
2 wins

- Ian McKellen
- Burgess Meredith
- Andy Serkis
