= Gianni Nunnari =

Italian film and TV producer and executive

Gianni Nunnari (born August 10, 1959) is an Italian American film and television producer and executive.

== Early life ==
After completing his studies, he followed the footsteps of his father, Alexander Nunnari, and began his career in the film business.

== Career ==
After graduating from Pareto college, Gianni began his career working at Dick Randall, a Hong Kong-based foreign sales company, known for distributing Bruce Le, Bruce Li and also the very first Jackie Chan movies. Soon after the death of his father, he joined Mario Cecchi Gori and his son, Vittorio, to export their commercial Italian feature films.

=== Cecchi Gori Pictures ===
At age 25, Nunnari moved to Hollywood to expand the market horizon and product slate for Cecchi Gori Pictures and to distribute European films for the US market.

In 1991, Cecchi Gori produced Mediterraneo, which Nunnari and Cecchi Gori sold to Miramax before becoming a hit in the United States. It was subsequently awarded the Academy Award for Best Foreign Language Film.

Next, Nunnari convinced his friend Massimo Troisi, a Neapolitan film star primarily known for his peculiar comedic approach in film, to direct and star in Il Postino (1994). The film became the final motion picture in Troisi's career, as the star and director suffered a fatal heart attack the day after production wrapped. The critically acclaimed film was released posthumously and was nominated for five Oscars, including Best Picture and Best Actor, winning one for its musical score.

Nunnari's most notable success in producing foreign films for the US market was Life Is Beautiful (1998), directed by and starring Roberto Benigni. Nunnari orchestrated the distribution of the film worldwide, and it went on to win multiple awards, including the Academy Awards for Best Actor, Best Foreign Language Film, and Best Original Score. It returned over $25 million for Cecchi Gori, in addition to recouping the initial approximately $6 million production investment.

Nunnari was then appointed to oversee Penta Films, alongside Cecchi Gori and Silvio Berlusconi, to produce Hollywood commercial movies in the style of the Cecchi Gori films. Following his accomplishments in production, Nunnari expanded his business knowledge into entrepreneurial efforts, opening the popular Los Angeles restaurant Ago; among the restaurant's partners are Meir Teper, co-owner of the acclaimed Nobu chain, and Robert De Niro.

=== Independent producer ===
As an independent producer of motion pictures, Nunnari produced the hit film Se7en, which would take in over $327 million worldwide, and From Dusk till Dawn, starring George Clooney and Quentin Tarantino for Miramax. It was Clooney's first starring role on the big screen and became an instant success and a cult classic. In more recent years, Nunnari has produced several films for director Martin Scorsese, including The Departed, which would win Academy Awards for Best Picture and Best Director, Shutter Island, which starred Leonardo DiCaprio and earned nearly $300 million worldwide, and Silence, which received rave reviews and the AFI ranked as one of its ten Movies of the Year.

=== Hollywood Gang Productions ===
In the late 1990s, Nunnari founded the production company Hollywood Gang Productions. The company produced big-budget commercial spots, becoming one of the pioneers in using big Hollywood stars, such as Oscar-winners Robert De Niro and director Giuseppe Tornatore (Cinema Paradiso).

Segueing into feature film production, Nunnari and Hollywood Gang produced the feature film 300 (2007), directed by Zack Snyder, starring Gerard Butler, and based on the graphic novel by Frank Miller. The film took in over $700 million worldwide. Nunnari built the IP into a franchise with the sequel 300: Rise of an Empire (2014), starring Eva Green, Lena Headey, and Rodrigo Santoro. The company also produced Everybody’s Fine (2009), starring Robert De Niro, Kate Beckinsale, Sam Rockwell and Drew Barrymore, Immortals (2011), starring Henry Cavill, and most recently, The Domestics, starring Kate Bosworth and Tyler Hoechlin, which became one of the first pictures produced under the revived Orion Pictures label.

In 2016, Hollywood Gang produced its first television series, StartUp (2016), released by Sony's streaming services Crackle, executive produced by Nunnari.

In 2024, Nunnari produced Those About to Die, a Peacock-hit gladiator miniseries initiated by Centropolis, Street Entertainment, and Hollywood Gang. The show is based on the book Those About to Die by Daniel P. Mannix, to which Hollywood Gang acquired the rights. The limited series, written by Robert Rodat and directed by Roland Emmerich and Marco Kreuzpaintner, boasts a cast that includes actors of the caliber of Anthony Hopkins and Iwan Rheon and a budget of $140 million.

=== Euro Gang Entertainment ===
In August 2023, Nunnari co-founded Euro Gang Entertainment, affiliated with Hollywood Gang Productions, together with Simon Horsman. Created to act as a bridge between Europe and Hollywood, Euro Gang Entertainment is a production studio focused on developing, financing, and producing television series, feature films, and documentaries, as well as stage plays and live events. Headquartered in Los Angeles, the company has an additional office in Rome.

In 2024, Nunnari and Horsman produced a documentary about chef, restaurateur and hotelier Nobu Matsuhisa, directed by Matt Tyrnauer (Victoria's Secret: Angels and Demons), co-produced with Altimeter Films, WMG Productions, Los Angeles Media Fund and AGC Studios. The co-CEOs also produced the play Shit. Meet. Fan, a comedy-drama written and directed by Robert O'Hara, based on the 2016 Italian film Perfect Strangers, directed by Paolo Genovese. The show, co-produced by the MCC Theater OFF_Broadway, premiered on October 10, 2024, at The Robert W. Wilson MCC Theater Space and was an immediate success.

== Producing credits ==
=== Film credits ===
| Year | Title | Director | Box office | Notes |
|---|---|---|---|---|
| 1992 | Folks! | Ted Kotcheff | $6.1 million | as co-executive producer |
| 1992 | Man Trouble | Bob Rafelson | $4.1 million | as co-executive producer |
| 1993 | House of Cards | Michael Lessac | $322,871 | as co-executive producer |
| 1995 | Se7en | David Fincher | $327.2 million | as executive producer |
| 1996 | From Dusk till Dawn | Robert Rodriguez | $25.8 million | as producer |
| 1997 | The Blackout | Abel Ferrara | $0.11 million | as co-executive producer |
| 1999 | From Dusk till Dawn 2: Texas Blood Money | Scott Spiegel | | as producer |
| 1999 | From Dusk till Dawn 3: The Hangman's Daughter | P. J. Pesce | | as producer |
| 2004 | Alexander | Oliver Stone | $167.3 million | as executive producer |
| 2005 | O Casamento de Romeu e Julieta | Bruno Barreto | | as executive producer |
| 2006 | The Departed | Martin Scorsese | $289.8 million | as producer |
| 2006 | N (Io e Napoleone) | Paolo Virzì | | as producer |
| 2006 | 300 | Zack Snyder | $456.1 million | as producer |
| 2009 | Everybody's Fine | Kirk Jones | $16.4 million | as producer |
| 2010 | Shutter Island | Martin Scorsese | $294.8 million | as executive producer |
| 2011 | Immortals | Tarsem Singh | $226.9 million | as producer |
| 2014 | 300: Rise of an Empire | Noam Murro | $337.6 million | as producer |
| 2016 | Silence | Martin Scorsese | $27.3 million | as executive producer |
| 2018 | The Domestics | Mike P. Nelson | $59,766 | as producer |
| 2024 | The Thicket | Elliott Lester | | as producer |
| 2024 | Nobu | Matt Tyrnauer | | as producer |
| 2026 | The Last Photograph | Zack Snyder | | as producer |

=== Television credits ===
| Year | Title | Director | Original Release date | Notes |
|---|---|---|---|---|
| 2016 | StartUp | Ben Ketai | September 6, 2016 | as executive producer |
| 2024 | Those About to Die | Roland Emmerich, Marco Kreuzpaintner | July 2024 | as executive producer |
