= A Band Apart =

American film production company (1991–2006)

A Band Apart Films LLC
- Type: Private
- Industry: Entertainment; Motion picture
- Founded: 1991; 35 years ago
- Founders: Quentin Tarantino; Michael Bodnarchek; Lawrence Bender
- Defunct: 2006; 20 years ago
- Fate: Liquidation
- Successor: Visiona Romantica
- Headquarters: 7966 Beverly Boulevard; 2nd Floor; Los Angeles, California 90048; United States
- Key people: Lawrence Bender (CEO/president); Michael Bodnarchek (CEO/president); Adam Bloom (executive producer/head of production)
- Products: Film production; Television commercials; Music videos
- Website: abandapart.com (defunct)

A Band Apart Films LLC was an American independent film production company founded by Quentin Tarantino, Michael Bodnarchek, and Lawrence Bender in 1991, before its liquidation in 2006. Its name is a play on the French New Wave film Bande à part ("Band of Outsiders") by filmmaker Jean-Luc Godard, whose work was highly influential on the work of the company's members.

== History ==
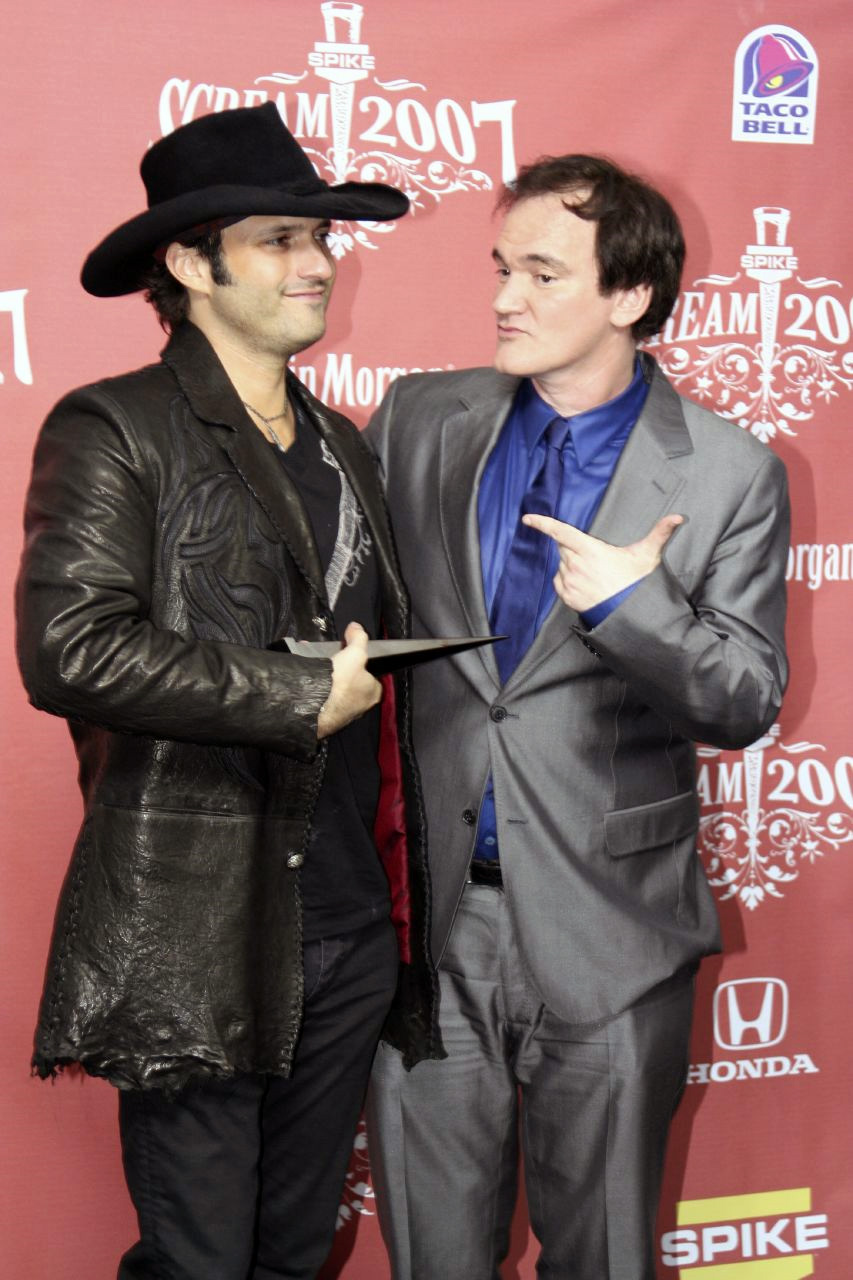
Robert Rodriguez and Quentin Tarantino, two central members of A Band Apart (pictured at the 2007 Scream Awards).

Tarantino formed A Band Apart in 1991, naming it after his favorite Godard film, Bande à part. The company's logo was a stylized image of the robbers from Reservoir Dogs, Tarantino's debut film. Subsequently, several legal entities within the company were named after the film's characters. Mr. Pink LLC was for music video production budgets, and Mr. Brown LLC was for commercials.

In addition to Tarantino, members of the company included Robert Rodriguez, John Woo, Tim Burton, Steve Buscemi, Darren Aronofsky, John Landis, Athanasius Acropolis, Joseph McGinty Nichol, Nigel Dick, Varl Hobe, Steve Carr, Cameron Casey, Marcel Langenegger, Wayne Isham, Cale Donk, Terry Windell, Lisa Prisco, Paul Street, Phil Harder-Rick Fuller, Coodie & Chike, Osbert Parker, Luc Besson, Porker LeVance, Adam Christian Clark, André 3000, Christopher Morrison and Michael Palmieri, Ducky Powell, Andy Mornahan, Chash Brower, Steve Lowe, Loren Hill, Darren Grant, Charles Whittenmier, Geoff McGann, Olivier Venturini, The 405 Guys, and Craig Tanamoto.

The company catapulted to fame with the 1994 release of Tarantino's Pulp Fiction, which was considered by some critics to be the most influential American film of the decade. In the summer of 1995, the company added a division for commercials and later, for music video production, adding a third co-owner Michael Bodnarchek. Michael Bodnarchek tapped Simon Foster to co-found A Band Apart Music Video who brought notable A-list Directors as well as Kristin Cruz (aka Kris Foster) and Heidi Santelli as directors' rep and executive producer, respectively.

=== Company closure ===
Tarantino and Bender had an amicable split, leaving Tarantino as the sole owner of the studio and the studio being up for liquidation, while David Heyman (Harry Potter, Gravity) produced Tarantino's ninth film, Once Upon a Time in Hollywood.

The company is listed for Tarantino's Inglourious Basterds (2009) and Django Unchained (2012), and credited for Grindhouse (2007).

== Filmography ==
=== Films produced and co-produced ===
Year	Title	Directed by	Distribution	Co-production	Notes
1992	Reservoir Dogs	Quentin Tarantino	Miramax Films	Live America Inc. Dog Eat Dog Productions	first film
1993	True Romance	Tony Scott	Warner Bros.	Morgan Creek Productions; Davis Films	
1994	Pulp Fiction	Quentin Tarantino	Miramax Films	Jersey Films	
1995	The Whiskey Heir	JoAnn Fregalette Jansen	A Band Apart	—N/a	Short film
1995	White Man's Burden	Desmond Nakano	Savoy Pictures	UGC; Rysher Entertainment	
1995	Four Rooms	Allison Anders; Alexandre Rockwell; Robert Rodriguez; Quentin Tarantino	Miramax Films	—N/a	
1996	Curdled	Reb Braddock	Rolling Thunder Pictures; Miramax Films	Tinderbox Films	
1996	From Dusk till Dawn	Robert Rodriguez	Miramax Films	Dimension Films; Los Hooligans Productions	
1997	Jackie Brown	Quentin Tarantino	Miramax Films	Mighty Mighty Afrodite Productions; Lawrence Bender Productions	
1997	Good Will Hunting	Gus Van Sant	Miramax Films	Be Gentleman Limited Partnership	as Lawrence Bender Productions
1998	Metallica: Cunning Stunts	Wayne Ishun; Adam Dubin	Elektra Entertainment	Celluloid Construction Company; Woof! Woof!	Concert video
1999	From Dusk Till Dawn 2: Texas Blood Money	Scott Spiegel	Buena Vista Home Entertainment	Dimension Home Video; Los Hooligans	Direct-to-video
2000	From Dusk Till Dawn 3: The Hangman's Daughter	P. J. Pesce	Amuse Pictures; Buena Vista Home Video; New Films International	Dimension Home Video; Los Hooligans	Direct-to-video
2003	Kill Bill: Volume 1	Quentin Tarantino	Miramax Films	—N/a	
2004	Dirty Dancing: Havana Nights	Guy Ferland	Lionsgate Films; Miramax Films	Artisan Entertainment; Havana Nights LLC; Lawrence Bender Productions; Miramax Films	
2004	Kill Bill: Volume 2	Quentin Tarantino	Miramax Films	—N/a	
2004	Kill Bill: The Whole Bloody Affair	Quentin Tarantino	Lionsgate Films	—N/a	
2007	Death Proof	Quentin Tarantino	Dimension Films	Troublemaker Studios	Soundtrack only
2009	Inglourious Basterds	Quentin Tarantino	The Weinstein Company; Universal Pictures	Studio Babelsberg; Visiona Romantica	
2012	Django Unchained	Quentin Tarantino	The Weinstein Company; Columbia Pictures	Columbia Pictures	last film

=== Music videos produced (partial list) ===
Year	Title	Artist(s)
1997	"Promise Ain't Enough"	Hall & Oates
1998	"Pretty Fly (for a White Guy)"	The Offspring
1998	"Fuel"	Metallica
1998	"Believe"	Cher
1998	"The City Is Mine"	Jay-Z ft. Blackstreet
1998	"Miami"	Will Smith
1998	"Clock Strikes"	Timbaland & Magoo ft. Mad Skillz
1998	"Hard Knock Life"	Jay-Z
1999	"Everything You Want"	Vertical Horizon
1999	"The Hardest Thing"	98 Degrees
2000	"Bye Bye Bye"	NSYNC
2000	"Hemorrhage (In My Hands)"	Fuel
2000	"(Rock) Superstar"	Cypress Hill
2000	"U Got It"	Cleopatra
2000	"Breathless"	The Corrs
2000	"Oops!... I Did It Again"	Britney Spears
2001	"Cry"	Mandy Moore
2001	"Crush"	Mandy Moore
2001	"Pop"	NSYNC
2001	"Overprotected"	Britney Spears
2003	"Some Girls"	JC Chasez
2003	"Falls on Me"	Fuel
2005	"An Honest Mistake"	The Bravery
2005	"Resolve"	Foo Fighters
2005	"Juicebox (song)"	The Strokes
