= Seth Gecko =

- From Dusk till Dawn character
- George Clooney as Seth Gecko in From Dusk till Dawn
- First appearance: From Dusk till Dawn
- Last appearance: From Dusk till Dawn: The Series
- Created by: Quentin Tarantino; Robert Kurtzman
- Portrayed by: George Clooney (films); D. J. Cotrona (TV series)

In-universe information
- Gender: Male
- Occupation: Criminal
- Relatives: Richie Gecko (brother)

Seth Gecko is the name of two fictional characters in the From Dusk till Dawn film series. The original Seth is the protagonist of the original film, described as a cool, suave, short-fused, anti-heroic criminal in the From Dusk till Dawn universe consisting of the 1996 film and its 2001 spin-off video game of the same name. An alternate universe version of the character appears in the 2014–16 television series. He is portrayed by George Clooney in the original film and by D. J. Cotrona in the television series.

== Film series universe ==
Seth Gecko was originally in prison prior to the events of From Dusk till Dawn but was broken out by his mentally ill younger brother (and partner in crime), Richie. At the film's opening, they are being hunted by the police for several murders, bank robberies and kidnappings. Despite being a hardened criminal, who robs and kidnaps without compunction, he is shown to have an apparent code of honor, only killing when he feels necessary and promising to eventually release a woman he and Richie had taken hostage. He later becomes infuriated when Richie rapes and murders the woman.

=== Film plot ===
In the original film, Seth and his unhinged younger brother Richie have just robbed a bank, and taken one of its female employees as a hostage. When Seth briefly leaves the room, Richie rapes and kills the woman, for which Seth attacks and almost kills him. While on the run from the law, he and Richie kidnap Jacob Fuller and his two children, Kate and Scott, so they can use them as cover to cross the border. Seth immediately sees that Richie is attracted to Kate, and reassures Jacob that she will be safe as long as they do as they are told. After crossing the border into Mexico, they go to a bar called Titty Twister, where Seth is supposed to meet Carlos, his contact. At the Titty Twister, the strippers transform into vampires and attack the group, along with all the other patrons of the establishment. Richie is turned into a vampire, forcing Seth to kill his own brother. At the end of the film, Carlos arrives and unknowingly rescues them by breaking the door and letting sunlight in, killing the vampires. He is one of the two only survivors, the other being Kate, Jacob's daughter. He offers her some of the cash from the bank robbery and he and the others go to El Rey, leaving Kate with her father's RV, because El Rey would be too dangerous for her.

The Gecko brothers are mentioned in From Dusk Till Dawn 2: Texas Blood Money. Sheriff Otis Lawson references Edgar McGraw's cold demeanor and distracted nature, including the murder of his father Earl.

=== Other appearances ===
The Gecko brothers briefly appear in a photo cameo in the black comedy Curdled. In addition, Katie Houge, news reporter from the first film, appears, again portrayed by Kelly Preston.

=== Video games ===
In the From Dusk till Dawn video game it is revealed that sometime after the events of the film, Seth is arrested and condemned to life in prison for the murders Richie committed. He is now shown as an inmate of the fictional Rising Sun high-security prison, a converted tanker floating off the coast of New Orleans. Vampires infiltrate the prison by posing as inmates. They murder the transport guards and the warden and begin a rampage. In the chaos, Seth gains a weapon and escapes his cell. Eventually, he manages to kill the vampires and escapes the prison along with the other survivors.

== Television series universe ==
A TV series inspired by the films is set in a parallel reality. Mixing ideals from the original first and third films, the show pits the humans, led by Seth, who is played by D. J. Cotrona against the culebras, notably Santanico Pandemonium, played by Eiza González and Sheriff McGraw, played by Don Johnson. This series stars Robert Patrick as Jacob Fuller.
