= Meir Teper =

Israeli film producer and businessman

- Born: United States
- Occupations: Film producer; businessman
- Years active: 1983–present

Meir Teper is an American-Israeli film producer and businessman. He is also one of Nobu's three founders, along with Robert De Niro and Nobu Matsuhisa.

== Filmography ==
He was a producer in all films unless otherwise noted.

=== Film ===
Year	Film	Credit	Notes
1992	Mistress		
1993	What's Eating Gilbert Grape		
1996	From Dusk till Dawn		
1996	When Saturday Comes		
1999	From Dusk Till Dawn 2: Texas Blood Money		Direct-to-video
1999	From Dusk Till Dawn 3: The Hangman's Daughter		Direct-to-video
