= From Dusk Till Dawn (video game) =

2001 video game

- Developer: GameSquad
- Publishers: EU: Cryo Interactive; NA: DreamCatcher Interactive
- Platform: Microsoft Windows
- Release: NA: October 4, 2001
- Genre: Third-person shooter
- Mode: Single-player

From Dusk Till Dawn (French: Une nuit en enfer) is a 2001 third-person shooter video game that is based on events that transpire directly after the end of From Dusk till Dawn. Released for Windows, it was distributed by Cryo Interactive.

== Plot ==
Seth Gecko, one of the two survivors of the movie From Dusk till Dawn, has been condemned to death for the murders his dead brother Richie committed. He is now an inmate of the fictional Rising Sun high-security prison, a converted tanker floating off the coast of New Orleans.

Vampires infiltrate the prison by posing as inmates. They murder the transport guards and the warden and begin a rampage. In the chaos, Seth gains a weapon and escapes his cell.

At the end, Seth kills the vampires and escapes the prison along with the other survivors.

== Reception ==
Reception

Aggregate scores
Aggregator	Score
GameRankings	63.11%
Metacritic	58/100

Review scores
Publication	Score
AllGame	2/5
Eurogamer	6/10
GameSpot	5.7/10
GameSpy	60%
GameZone	8.5/10
PC Zone	58%

The game was met with mixed reception upon release, as GameRankings gave it a score of 63.11%, while Metacritic gave it 58 out of 100.
