= Dawn to Dusk =

Dawn to Dusk may refer to:

- Dawn to Dusk, the first disc of the album Mellon Collie and the Infinite Sadness by The Smashing Pumpkins
- "Dawn to Dusk", a song from the Raga soundtrack
- Dawn-to-dusk transcontinental flight across the United States, an aviation record established in 1924

== See also ==
- Dusk Till Dawn (disambiguation)
- From Dusk till Dawn (disambiguation)
- Dusk to Dawn, a 1922 film by King Vidor
