= Dusk Till Dawn =

Dusk Till Dawn may refer to:

- "Dusk Till Dawn" (Zayn song), 2017
- "Dusk Till Dawn" (Ladyhawke song), 2008
- Dusk Till Dawn (album), by Bobby V
- Dusk Till Dawn (casino), a cardroom and casino in Lenton, Nottingham
- Dusk till Dawn: The Best of Capercaillie, a compilation album

== See also ==
- From Dusk till Dawn (disambiguation)
- Dawn to Dusk (disambiguation)
- Dusk of Dawn, a 1940 autobiography by W.E.B. Du Bois
- Dusk to Dawn, a 1922 silent film by King Vidor
