= Skin (American TV series) =

American television drama

- Genre: Drama
- Created by: Jim Leonard
- Starring: Ron Silver; Kevin Anderson; Pamela Gidley; Rachel Ticotin; Olivia Wilde; D.J. Cotrona; D. W. Moffett; Laura Leighton; Ginger Lynn Allen
- Composer: Ron Jeremy
- Country of origin: United States
- Original language: English
- No. of seasons: 1
- No. of episodes: 8

Production
- Executive producers: Jim Leonard; Jonathan Littman; Jerry Bruckheimer
- Running time: approx. 43 minutes
- Production companies: Jerry Bruckheimer Television; Hoosier Karma Productions; Warner Bros. Television

Original release
- Network: Fox
- Release: October 20 – November 3, 2003
- Network: SOAPnet
- Release: May 21 – June 18, 2005

Skin is an American drama television series which aired at 9:00 p.m. Monday on Fox from October 20 to November 3, 2003. It followed the tale of two teenagers who came from feuding families on opposite sides of the moral and legal spectrum. Adam (D. J. Cotrona) is the son of the Los Angeles County District Attorney, and Jewel (Olivia Wilde) is the daughter of a pornographer. The show is a modern-day take on the Romeo and Juliet story. Despite heavy promotion, the series was cancelled after three of its eight filmed episodes aired, amid poor ratings and mixed reviews. In 2005, SOAPnet acquired broadcasting rights to the series and aired the remaining five episodes.

== Production ==
Jim Leonard had the idea for the show, and put it forward to Jerry Bruckheimer. It was to be a Romeo and Juliet romance between the daughter of a porn king and the son of a crusading district attorney. Fox was interested as "it was a really character-based drama, and a new world" where pornography would be the background, not the focus. Leonard said "Our goal was to take the soap out of soap opera and to tell a kind of operatic big story where worlds come together," and that he had long wanted to do a show that was about "sex, race and love."

Skin was produced by Jerry Bruckheimer Television and Hoosier Karma Productions in association with Warner Bros. Television The executive producers were creator Jim Leonard, Jonathan Littman, Jerry Bruckheimer. During production, Bruckheimer suggested that DVD releases of the series contain more explicit content than the broadcast edits. It was the first series produced by Bruckheimer to be canceled.

== Cast and characters ==
Larry Goldman is Jewish, a pornography magnate and loving father, who controls the Los Angeles pornography industry. Barbara is his bubbly platinum-blonde wife and Jewel is their 16-year-old daughter. Thomas Roam is a Catholic Los Angeles district attorney running for re-election, at a time when missing children, linked to child pornography, dominate the news. Laura Roam, his wife, is a judge, and Adam is their half-Mexican/half-Irish 16-year-old son.

=== Casting ===
Ron Silver was cast as main character Larry Goldman. Goldman was to be a likable personality whose professional conduct is questionable. "What I wanted to set up was a situation where nobody's good and nobody's bad, and you ultimately don't know who to root for," said Leonard. Silver said "I was fascinated by the potential complexity of the character". In researching his role Silver met with Larry Flynt and Jenna Jameson as well as reading magazines and watching videos. Olivia Wilde played his daughter Jewel and Pamela Gidley played his wife Barbara. Kevin Anderson played the Los Angeles district attorney, Thomas Roam, who was out to get Goldman. Anderson elaborated on his character stating, "He's not an out-and-out good guy, there's a dark side. He's different than the run-of-the-mill do-gooder crusader lawyer." His son, Adam, and wife, Laura, were played by D. J. Cotrona and Rachel Ticotin respectively. Other recurring characters included D. W. Moffett as Skip Ziti, Laura Leighton as Cynthia Peterson, and Ginger Lynn Allen as Amber Synn. Chris Evans appeared in a small role as a similar character to the Romeo and Juliet character of Tybalt.

== Marketing ==
In the lead-up to its premiere, promos for Skin were frequently shown during Fox's coverage of the 2003 Major League Baseball postseason. A frequently-aired ad featuring Silver's terse delivery of the line "His father is the district attorney!" was singled out by critics in particular; after its cancellation, ESPN writer Bill Simmons joked that Skin "[broke] Falcone's record for 'most promos shown during a prolonged sporting event versus number of actual episodes that made the air'." Chicago Tribune media writer Phil Rosenthal acknowledged the program when discussing TBS's similarly-excessive promotions for series (such as Frank TV) during its own postseason coverage, noting that Silver's "loud, urgent line-reading" had become "a punch line through repetition".

== Reception ==
On May 30, 2003 Bruce Fretts of Entertainment Weekly picked Skin as one of the most promising new series for the 2003–2004 American television season. Fretts said that redoing Romeo and Juliet in a modern setting was nothing new, but having Romeo's father be a district attorney going after Juliet's porn-king father was original enough that "methinks Shakespeare would approve."

Robert Bianco of USA Today said, "Skin traps a 21st-century Romeo and Juliet between two dirty worlds: politics and porn. Throw in race, religion, and economic disparity, and you have enough problems to keep a soap busy for decades. ...Yet there's nothing salacious or pornographic about the show itself, which by current standards is relatively chaste." Bianco described the plot as "amusingly complicated" and Cotrona and Wilde as an "almost impossibly attractive couple". Alessandra Stanley of The New York Times said, "Fox has pulled off a slick, clever melodrama that holds one's attention even when pole-dancing, thong-snapping adult entertainers are off the screen" because "the adults do not fit neatly into hero and villain categories."

Matthew Gilbert of The Boston Globe begins his review by saying, "If you were to write a book about MTV's influence on series television, you'd have to devote a long chapter to Skin." Tim Goodman of the San Francisco Chronicle points out that by the time Skin premiered it was already about a month into the new television season and there were many good shows already struggling to find an audience and it was too late for another show that wasn't truly great to premiere. In exploring the plot development Goodman says, "You begin to think this might be the shortest story arc ever -- a three-episode season." In addressing the conceptual similarities to Romeo and Juliet Goodman wrote, "This kind of forced drama may have worked in Shakespeare's time, but the modern audience doesn't want a tease it can predict."

In addressing the show's cancellation Ken Tucker of Entertainment Weekly described Skin as one of Fox's good shows and said he expected Arrested Development to be cancelled. Tucker goes on to say of the critical praise the show had received, "critics didn't want to look prudish, so their effusive ejaculations... were premature".

Originally aired on Fox, the first episode attracted 6.3 million viewers. It was down to fewer than 5.1 million viewers in its second airing and fewer than 4.1 million by its third airing.

== Episodes ==
The first three episodes were shown on Fox in 2003 and SOAPnet aired the eight episodes in 2005. There were reports at the time the show was canceled that nine episodes had been produced. CNN reported on November 5, 2003 that production on the series had shut down the day before, after completion of the eighth episode.

No.	Title	Directed by	Written by	Original release date	Prod. code	US viewers (millions)
1	"Pilot"	Russell Mulcahy	Jim Leonard	October 20, 2003	475205	6.5
Jewel and Adam, although from highly different worlds, meet and fall in love. Even though their fathers are trying to bring the other down, the couple profess their love to each other and continue dating. Note: This episode aired in Canada on October 19, 2003.
2	"Secrets & Lies"	Tucker Gates	Jim Leonard & Natalie Chaidez	October 27, 2003	176301	5.1
Adam and Jewel make love in Jewel's bedroom. Adam is arrested while trying to escape the property later that night and his father learns that they are still dating.
3	"Endorsement"	Greg Yaitanes	Jim Leonard & Natalie Chaidez	November 3, 2003	176302	4.0
Jewel and Adam agree to meet at a conference in honor of his father, but she becomes upset when she learns that Adam's father is planning to arrest her dad.
4	"Amber Synn"	David Grossman	Gina Fattore	May 21, 2005	176303	N/A
When a political scandal breaks, involving large donations from a Political Action Committee (PAC) funded by Goldman to Roam's campaign, Amber demands to meet with Goldman. Meanwhile, Laura asks Cynthia about an affair with Adam, and Darlene makes her movie debut. Note: This episode was scheduled to air on Fox on November 10, 2003.
5	"Fidelity"	Bryan Spicer	Ted Mann	May 28, 2005	176304	N/A
Roam panics when someone breaks into Cynthia's apartment; Adam and Jewel pretend to date others; Zelda insinuates to Barbara that Goldman is unfaithful; Darlene schemes to overthrow reigning pornography queen Geena Devine. Note: This episode was scheduled to air on Fox on November 17, 2003.
6	"Blowback"	Tucker Gates	Zach Reiter	June 4, 2005	176305	N/A
Tom tries to blackmail Larry out of posting his indiscretion on the Internet; Adam agonizes about the TV reports.
7	"Family Values"	Terrence O'Hara	Tim Mason & Leo Geter	June 11, 2005	176306	N/A
Larry and Barbara learn that Jacob has been surfing the Goldman websites; Adam comes clean to Laura about Jewel. Larry reads Jewel's e-mail.
8	"True Lies"	Greg Yaitanes	Gina Fattore & Ted Mann	June 18, 2005	176307	N/A
Tom threatens to kill Larry if Laura does not survive; Darlene assumes her new alter-ego; the Goldmans begin to accept Jewel and Adam's relationship.
