= From Dusk Till Dawn 2: Texas Blood Money =

1999 horror film

- US poster for From Dusk Till Dawn 2: Texas Blood Money
- Directed by: Scott Spiegel
- Screenplay by: Scott Spiegel; Duane Whitaker
- Story by: Scott Spiegel; Boaz Yakin
- Produced by: Michael S. Murphey; Gianni Nunnari; Meir Teper
- Starring: Robert Patrick; Bo Hopkins; Duane Whitaker; Muse Watson; Brett Harrelson; Danny Trejo; Raymond Cruz
- Cinematography: Philip Lee
- Edited by: Bob Murawski
- Music by: Joseph Stanley Williams
- Production companies: Dimension Home Video; A Band Apart; Los Hooligans
- Distributed by: Buena Vista Home Entertainment
- Release date: March 16, 1999
- Running time: 85 minutes
- Country: United States
- Language: English

From Dusk Till Dawn 2: Texas Blood Money is an American direct-to-video horror Western film released on March 16, 1999. It is the second film in the From Dusk till Dawn series and is a sequel to From Dusk till Dawn. The film was an early test release by Dimension Films for the direct-to-video market. It was co-written and directed by Scott Spiegel. Michael S. Murphey, Gianni Nunnari, and Meir Teper produced. Quentin Tarantino and Lawrence Bender executive produced, and Elizabeth Avellan co-produced. The film was filmed on location in South Africa and features cameos by Bruce Campbell and Tiffani Thiessen. It won a Saturn Award from the Academy of Science Fiction, Fantasy and Horror Films for the "Best Home Video Release" of 1999.

A third film in the series, From Dusk Till Dawn 3: The Hangman's Daughter, which is a prequel to From Dusk till Dawn, was released in 2000. In late 2010, a possible fourth film in the series was in production, but no progress was made after its initial stage. A TV series adaptation was released in 2014. James Parks would also later reprise his role as Edgar McGraw in Kill Bill: Volume 1, Kill Bill: Volume 2, Grindhouse (within Death Proof) and Machete; despite having the same actor and character, those films are not related to each other and the character is considered to be an Easter Egg.

== Plot ==
After escaping from prison, bank robber Luther Heggs (Duane Whitaker) is the subject of a manhunt led by Texas Ranger Otis Lawson. Luther contacts his reformed former accomplice Buck Bowers (Robert Patrick) and tells him to get their old gang back together for another heist. Buck starts rounding up the old team, which consists of C.W. Niles (Muse Watson), Jesus Draven (Raymond Cruz), and Ray Bob (Brett Harrelson).

Buck and the team stop at the El Coyote Motel to wait for Luther. En route, Luther damages his car after hitting a bat and walks to a nearby bar, the Titty Twister. The bartender, Razor Eddie (Danny Trejo), offers Luther a ride, but when he learns Luther hit the bat, he instead brings Luther back to the scene of the accident. Eddie and the bat, who was actually his friend Victor (Joe Virzi), reveal themselves as vampires and turn Luther.

At the motel, Jesus leaves the group to have sex with Lupe (Maria Checa), another of the guests. Luther arrives in bat form and kills Lupe as she showers afterward, then attacks Jesus. Jesus stuns Luther, but is then ambushed in the bathroom by the now-vampiric Lupe while trying to hide. He decapitates her but cannot escape from Luther, who bites and turns him. The motel owner calls the police before Luther kills her. Luther and Jesus then join the rest of the gang, and Luther lays out his plan for robbing the Banco Bravos bank, which he says they will carry out immediately. Buck, though hesitant due to Luther's unusual lack of preparation for the heist, agrees to go along with the plan. Otis and the police arrive after the gang leaves and observe the crime scene left behind.

The gang travel to the bank, with Luther and Jesus covering the car's windows with black paper so they can hide in it once the sun rises. When they arrive, Luther uses his bat form to enter the bank through the vents, then murders the guard to acquire the keys so the rest of the gang can enter. While Buck, Jesus and Ray Bob guard the lobby, Luther supervises C.W. in cracking the vault. Luther struggles to suppress his vampiric behaviors, causing C.W. to discover his secret. They fight, and Luther easily overpowers and bites C.W.; during their struggle, Luther accidentally sets off the bank's alarm, alerting the police. Buck becomes anxious about what will happen when the police discover the dead guard and decides to give up on the heist. He attempts to convince the others to leave, but Jesus, Luther and C.W. refuse, and Buck notices the bite marks on C.W.'s neck.

Buck and Ray Bob try to get away but are cornered by the arriving police, forcing them to go back inside the bank. Otis orders the police to try entering the bank from the roof, but the officers are killed by Luther, who attacks them in bat form. As the standoff escalates, Buck discovers that Jesus has no reflection in a computer screen and tries unsuccessfully to warn Ray Bob about what is happening. Ray Bob leaves to use the restroom, but is intimidated into helping Luther and C.W. load the money. As they finish collecting the money, Buck turns on them and holds them at gunpoint, telling Ray Bob that they are vampires. However, Ray Bob reveals that he was turned while he was helping gather the money. Buck flees and fights his way out of the bank with a makeshift cross, only to be arrested by Otis, who disregards his warnings not to enter the bank, outside.

Otis sends in the SWAT team, but the vampires kill them all. The sun begins to rise, forcing the vampires to hide. However, an eclipse soon begins, freeing them to slaughter the police outside the bank. Buck, Otis and lawman Edgar McGraw survive and fight back using improvised crosses, hoping to stun the vampires long enough for the sun to return. A female officer who was turned attacks them, allowing the vampires to counterattack. Buck kills the officer, but Jesus kills McGraw and betrays the other vampires, attempting to steal the loot for himself before Luther catches him. Otis kills C.W., while Buck uses a horned hood ornament to impale and kill Jesus. As the eclipse ends, Luther and Ray Bob try to escape to their car. Luther is staked by Buck, who was hiding in the back seat. Buck then uses his sunglasses to reflect sunlight onto Ray Bob, killing him.

In the aftermath, Buck reunites with Otis, and they take in the events that have occurred. As they hear sirens approaching, Otis allows Buck to flee with the money, giving him a head start out of respect for his aid against the vampires.

== Cast ==
- Robert Patrick as Buck Bowers
- Bo Hopkins as Ranger Otis Lawson
- Duane Whitaker as Luther Heggs
- Muse Watson as C.W. Niles
- Brett Harrelson as Ray Bob
- Raymond Cruz as Jesus Draven
- Danny Trejo as "Razor" Eddie
- James Parks as Ranger Edgar McGraw
- Stacie Bourgeois as Marcy
- Maria Checa as Lupe
- Tiffani Thiessen as Pam
- Bruce Campbell as Barry
- Terry Norton as Teri Harper
- Joe Virzi as Victor

== Production ==
From Dusk Till Dawn 2: Texas Blood Money and From Dusk Till Dawn 3: The Hangman's Daughter were produced at the same time as one another with Robert Rodríguez and his cousin Álvaro Rodríguez shepherding their own prequel pitch which would serve as the basis for From Dusk Till Dawn 3, while Quentin Tarantino, Lawrence Bender, and Scott Spiegel produced their own sequel pitch which would become From Dusk Till Dawn 2. Both films were shot back-to-back in order to share costs and filming resources between the productions and get two movies for the price of one.

Tarantino and Scott Spiegel attended the premiere of From Dusk till Dawn and met Bob Weinstein whom Scott had worked with while writing a draft of Halloween 6 that was rejected by Moustapha Akkad. When the subject of the sequel came up in their discussion, Weinstein offhandedly suggest Spiegel handle the sequel. Shortly thereafter Spiegel wrote the story with friend Boaz Yakin and successfully pitched it to both Tarantino and Weinstein. In the initial premise Spiegel outlined, Seth Gecko would have been killed shortly after the events of the last film while heading to meet up with his criminal associates in Mexico for a larger heist. When the news reaches the crew they learn that the Titty Twister was the location he came from and go there to see if Richie Gecko is still alive and has the loot from the heist only to find out he's now King of the vampires. Tarantino was reluctant to reprise his role as Richie so instead the concept was retooled as a standalone follow-up. The film was shot over the course of 40 days in Cape Town, South Africa. Inspired by the success of previously produced direct-to-video The Prophecy II, Miramax used From Dusk Till Dawn 2 as a way of testing the waters to see if direct-to-video franchise sequels were a viable avenue.

== Release ==
From Dusk Till Dawn 2 was originally released direct-to-video on March 16, 1999.

Echo Bridge Entertainment released it on Blu-ray on May 15, 2011.

== Reception ==
Rotten Tomatoes, a review aggregator, reports that 9% of 11 surveyed critics gave the film a positive review; the average rating was 3.4/10. Bilge Ebiri of Entertainment Weekly rated it D− and wrote: "Without the genre-bending goofiness and engaging characters of the first Dusk, all that's left is cheap splatter effects and cliched Western/horror homages". Nathan Rabin of The A.V. Club called it "a gigantic waste of everyone's time, money, and energy". Youssef Kdiry of DVD Talk rated the film 4/5 stars. Jim Thomas of DVD Verdict called the film "half-baked" and "disappointing", even for a direct-to-video release.

== See also ==
- Vampire film
