= Zane Holtz =

Canadian actor and model (born 1987)

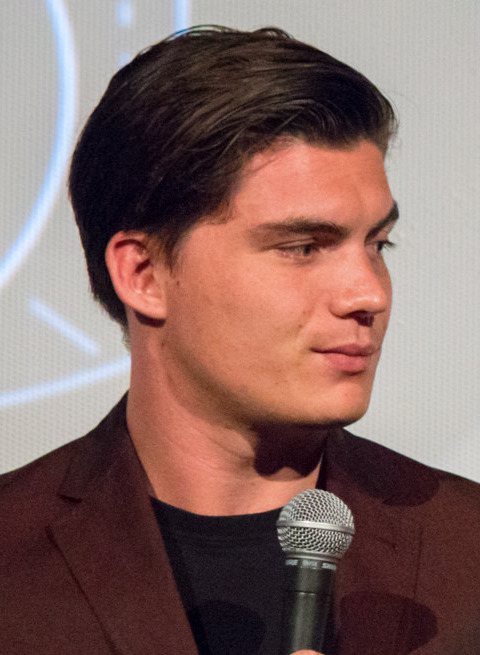
- Born: Zane-Ray Brodie Holtz; January 18, 1987 (age 39); Vancouver, British Columbia, Canada
- Occupations: Actor; model
- Years active: 1992–present
- Spouse: Chelsea Thea Pagnini
- Children: 4

Zane-Ray Brodie Holtz (born January 18, 1987) is a Canadian actor and model. He is best known for playing Richie Gecko on the El Rey Network television series From Dusk till Dawn: The Series (2014–2016) and K.O. Kelly on The CW series Riverdale and Katy Keene (2020).

== Career ==
In 2013, he played Nick in Jodi Arias: Dirty Little Secret, a television movie about the murder of Travis Alexander.

In 2019, Holtz was added to the cast of CW's Katy Keene, playing the role of Ko Kelly.

== Personal life ==
Holtz is married to Chelsea Thea Pagnini and they have four children.

== Filmography ==
=== Film ===
Year	Film	Role	Notes
2003	Holes	Louis "Barf Bag"	
2007	Smoke	Son	Short
2008	Jack N Jill	Dexter	Short
2010	Percy Jackson & the Olympians: The Lightning Thief	50's Tough	
2010	Vampires Suck	Alex	
2012	The Perks of Being a Wallflower	Chris	SDFCS Award for Best Ensemble Performance
2013	Grace Unplugged	Jay Grayson	
2013	Jodi Arias: Dirty Little Secret	Nick	Television film
2013	Heartburn	Lance Corporal "Flea" Jones	Short
2015	7 Minutes	Owen	
2015	The Curse of Downers Grove	Guy	
2015	Battle Scars	Luke Stephens	
2015	Wind Walkers	Sean Kotz	
2016	Kadence	Gideon	Short
2016	Girl in the Box	Cameron	Television film
2017	Searchers	Cooper	Television film
2018	Hunter Killer	Paul Martinelli	
2018	Beyond the Night	Ray Marrow	
2019	Tempting Fate	Matt Shaw	Television film
2025	Frontier Crucible	Abner Beckford	

=== Television ===
Year	Series	Role	Notes
2001	CSI: Crime Scene Investigation	Dylan Buckley	Episode: "Overload"
2002	Judging Amy	Jimmy Secor	Episode: "Every Stranger's Face I See"
2006	America's Next Top Model	Himself	Episode: "The Girl Who Kisses a Male Model"
2009	Crash	Paul	Episode: "No Matter What You Do"
2009	Cold Case	Herbert "Wolf" James '44	Episode: "WASP"
2010	CSI: Miami	Brady Jensen	Episode: "Sudden Death"
2010–2012	Make It or Break It	Austin Tucker	18 episodes
2012	Workaholics	Lance	Episode: "Flashback in the Day"
2013	NCIS	Navy Petty Officer Third Class Kevin Wyeth	Episode: "Squall" 229 ep.
2014–2016	From Dusk till Dawn: The Series	Richie Gecko	Main cast; Nominated – Fangoria Chainsaw Award for Best TV Supporting Actor
2014	Matador	Himself	Episode: "Quid Go Pro"
2017	White Famous	Chris	1 Episode
2020	Katy Keene	K.O. Kelly	Main cast; 10 episodes
2021–2022	Riverdale	K.O. Kelly	Episodes: "Chapter Seventy-Seven: Climax" and "Chapter One Hundred and Five: Folk Heroes"
2021–2025	NCIS	NCIS Special Agent Dale Sawyer	Episodes: "Gut Punch"(409 ep.), "Fight or Flight"(426 ep.), "Big Rig"(447 ep.), "Moonlit"(482 ep.) and "The Sound and the Fury"
2022	Walker	Eric Davies	Episode: "Bygones"
2022	All Rise	Riley Pierce	Episode: "The Game"

=== Music Videos ===
Year	Title	Artist
2015	"Confident"	Demi Lovato

=== Web ===
Year	Series	Role	Notes
2012	BlackBoxTV	Rob Turner	Episode: "AEZP: The Hollow"
