= D. J. Cotrona =

American actor (born 1980)

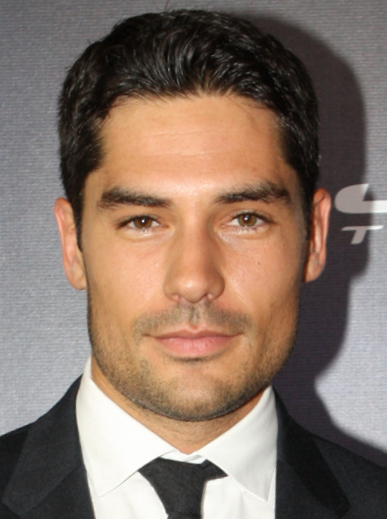
- D.J. Cotrona in March 2013
- Born: Donald Joseph Cotrona; May 23, 1980 (age 46); New Haven, Connecticut, United States
- Occupation: Actor
- Years active: 2003–present

Donald Joseph Cotrona (born May 23, 1980) is an American actor, known for his role in the film G.I. Joe: Retaliation (2013) and as Seth Gecko in the El Rey Network horror television series From Dusk till Dawn. He was cast as Pedro Peña's superhero form in the DC Extended Universe film Shazam! and returned for the role in the 2023 sequel.

== Early life ==
Cotrona was born in New Haven, Connecticut. His mother, Sheree, is a teacher, and his father, Donald, works for a recycling company. Cotrona has partial Italian ancestry. He began studying to be a lawyer at Northeastern University in Boston, but after doing a summer internship at a law firm, he realized that he did not like working with lawyers. In his sophomore year, he switched to acting. During his spring break, he went to visit a friend in Los Angeles and never returned to college.

== Career ==
After a few guest-starring roles, Cotrona was considered for the role of Ryan Atwood on the television series The O.C. but that role went to Ben McKenzie. Shortly after that, Cotrona was cast as the male lead in another of Fox's new dramas of 2003, Skin, produced by Jerry Bruckheimer. Cotrona played Adam Roam, the son of the Los Angeles District Attorney. His character becomes involved with Jewel Goldman (Olivia Wilde), whose father runs a pornography company. With their fathers' feud looming over them, they pursue a "Romeo and Juliet" relationship. Skin was cancelled after three episodes aired, due to poor ratings and the controversial story lines. All eight episodes of the series were shown on SOAPnet in 2005.

Cotrona appeared in the 2005 horror film Venom, which was directed by Jim Gillespie. Cotrona also starred in the 2006 Slamdance Film Festival film Love is the Drug.

In 2005, Cotrona again landed a lead role in a TV series, playing Sean Mathers, a flower shop worker with a dark past who is one of a group of lottery winners, in the NBC series Windfall. The series was shown in the summer of 2006 rather than as a mid-season replacement for the 2005-06 TV season.

Cotrona was cast in the role of Superman for Warner Bros.' planned film Justice League: Mortal, but after issues resulting from the 2007–2008 Writers Guild of America strike and other production concerns, the film was cancelled.

In 2010, Cotrona appeared in the film Dear John. In February he was cast as Detective John Stone in the ABC pilot 187 Detroit, which also stars Michael Imperioli, Shaun Majumder, and Erin Cummings among others. When ABC ordered the series it was renamed Detroit 1-8-7. His character was killed in "Stone Cold", the sixteenth episode of the series.

Cotrona played Flint, one of the leading roles, in the sequel G.I. Joe: Retaliation (2013).

In March 2014, the horror television series From Dusk till Dawn developed by Robert Rodriguez based on his own cult horror film of the same title, was aired on the newly launched El Rey Network. Cotrona played Seth Gecko in the series, being a member of the main cast until the series ended in 2016.

Cotrona has since appeared in the promotional 30-minute short film for Tom Clancy's Ghost Recon Wildlands, which aired in February 2017.

== Filmography ==
=== Film ===
Year	Title	Role	Notes
2005	Venom	Sean	
2006	Love Is the Drug	Lucas Mitchell	
2010	Dear John	Noodles	
2013	G.I. Joe: Retaliation	Dashiell "Flint" R. Faireborn	
2017	Tom Clancy's Ghost Recon Wildlands: War Within the Cartel	Ricky Sandoval	Short film
2019	Shazam!	Super Hero Pedro	
2023	Shazam! Fury of the Gods	Super Hero Pedro	
2023	Spy Kids: Armageddon	Agent Devlin	
2025	Fight or Flight	—N/a	Writer

=== Television ===
Year	Title	Role	Notes
2003	Law & Order: Special Victims Unit	Donovan Alvarez	Episode: "Grief"
2003–2005	Skin	Adam Roam	8 episodes
2004	Hollywood Division		Unsold pilot
2004	101 Most Unforgettable SNL Moments	Himself	Television special
2006	Windfall	Sean Mathers	13 episodes
2010–11	Detroit 1-8-7	John Stone	16 episodes
2012	IC Places Hollywood	Himself	Episode 1x12
2012	1st Look	Himself	Episode 2x04
2013	Reel Junkie	Himself	1 episode
2013	Up Close with Carrie Keagan	Himself	Episode March 27, 2013
2013	Vivir de cine	Himself	Episode 1x23
2014–16	From Dusk till Dawn: The Series	Seth Gecko	30 episodes
2014	Matador	Party Guest	Episode: "Quid Go Pro"
2020	L.A.'s Finest	Luca Verone	4 episodes
