= James Parks (actor) =

American actor

- Born: James Jean Parks; November 16, 1968 (age 57); Ventura County, California, U.S.
- Years active: 1981–present
- Spouse: Margie Templo Parks
- Father: Michael Parks

James Jean Parks (born November 16, 1968) is an American actor known for his roles as Texas Ranger Edgar McGraw in From Dusk Till Dawn 2: Texas Blood Money, Kill Bill: Volume 1, Kill Bill: Volume 2, and Death Proof.

== Early life ==
Born in Ventura County, California, Parks was classically trained and initially worked in Shakespearean theater. Earl McGraw, the father of Edgar McGraw (played by Parks), is played by Park's real life father, Michael Parks.

== Career ==
He portrayed Deputy Gilber in the French horror film Rubber. Parks also acted alongside his father again in Kevin Smith's 2011 horror film, Red State, and appeared in Quentin Tarantino's films Django Unchained (as a tracker) and The Hateful Eight (as O.B. Jackson).

== Filmography ==
Key
†	Denotes films that have not yet been released

Year	Title	Role	Notes
1991	Conagher	Curly	TV movie
1992	Twin Peaks: Fire Walk with Me	Service Station Mechanic	
1999	From Dusk Till Dawn 2: Texas Blood Money	Edgar McGraw	
2000	$pent	Grant	
2002	Crocodile 2: Death Swamp	Squid	
2003	Kill Bill: Volume 1	Edgar McGraw	
2003	Star Trek: Enterprise	Deputy Bennings	Episode "North Star"
2004	Deadwood	Clell Watson	Episode "Deadwood"
2004	Kill Bill: Volume 2	Edgar McGraw	
2004	Kill Bill: The Whole Bloody Affair	Edgar McGraw	
2005	Daltry Calhoun	Arlo	
2005	House of the Dead 2	Bart	
2006	Eight Days to Live	Anderson	TV movie
2006	In ascolto	Anthony Ashe	
2006	Islander	Pokey	
2006	The Darkroom	Dwayne	
2007	Grindhouse	Edgar McGraw	Segment: "Death Proof"
2007	Fighting Words	Fresno Pete	
2007	Death Proof	Edgar McGraw	
2008	Three Priests	Johnny	
2008	Noble Things	J.C.	
2008	Street Poet	Fresno Pete	
2010	Rubber	Cop Doug	
2010	Amigo	Sgt. Runnels	
2010	Machete	Edgar McGraw	Uncredited cameo
2011	Red State	Mordechai	
2012	Django Unchained	Tracker	
2013	The Elevator: Three Minutes Can Change Your Life	Jack	
2014	Child of Grace	Graham	
2015	The Hateful Eight	O.B. Jackson	
2017–2019	The Son	Niles Gilbert	TV series
2019	The Walking Dead	Captured Whisperer	2 episodes
2022	Reginald the Vampire	Executive story editor	Season 1; Episodes 1 – 10
2022	Wrong Reasons	James Winandi	
TBA	The Summoning †	Brad	
