= From Dusk till Dawn =

1996 horror film

- Theatrical release poster
- Directed by: Robert Rodriguez
- Screenplay by: Quentin Tarantino
- Story by: Robert Kurtzman
- Produced by: Gianni Nunnari; Meir Teper
- Starring: Harvey Keitel; George Clooney; Quentin Tarantino; Juliette Lewis; Cheech Marin; Fred Williamson; Salma Hayek
- Cinematography: Guillermo Navarro
- Edited by: Robert Rodriguez
- Music by: Graeme Revell
- Production companies: Dimension Films; A Band Apart; Los Hooligans Productions
- Distributed by: Miramax Films
- Release dates: January 17, 1996 (Cinerama Dome); January 19, 1996 (United States)
- Running time: 108 minutes
- Country: United States
- Language: English
- Budget: $19 million
- Box office: $59.3 million

From Dusk till Dawn is a 1996 American black comedy crime action-horror film directed by Robert Rodriguez and written by Quentin Tarantino from a concept and story by Robert Kurtzman. Starring Harvey Keitel, George Clooney, Tarantino, Salma Hayek, and Juliette Lewis, the plot follows a pair of American criminal brothers (Clooney and Tarantino) who take a family as hostages to cross into Mexico, but ultimately find themselves trapped in a saloon, defending against an even greater threat.

From Dusk till Dawn premiered on January 17, 1996, at the Cinerama Dome theater in Hollywood, Los Angeles, and was released by Miramax Films on January 19 in the United States. It initially received mixed reviews from critics, who described the film as well-made if overly violent. After enjoying financial success at the box office, From Dusk till Dawn has since become a cult film and spawned a media franchise of sequel films, a video game, and other media adaptations.

== Plot ==
At a Texas roadside liquor store, fugitive bank robber Seth Gecko and his deranged brother Richie kill the clerk and a Texas Ranger and destroy the building. Richie nurses a gunshot to his hand as they drive down the highway to a motel and unload a hostage bank teller. When Seth returns from picking up dinner he finds that Richie has raped and murdered the hostage.

Jacob Fuller, a widowed pastor doubting his faith, arrives at the motel with his teenaged children Scott and Kate. Seth scouts their motor home, kidnaps them and forces them to drive to Mexico. After a tense encounter at the border, the border guard lets them through. They continue to an all-night strip club in the desert called Titty Twister, where the Geckos' contact Carlos will meet them in the morning and escort them to the hideout town of El Rey. The doorman tries to block them, but the Geckos overpower him and walk inside with the Fullers.

The rowdy club scene includes Sex Machine, a biker who packs a pistol between his legs, and Frost, a burly Vietnam War veteran. The bartender tells Seth that only bikers and truckers are allowed, but Jacob insists that his motor home license makes him a truck driver, and the bartender agrees. The group settle in to watch a dance by the club's star stripper, Santánico Pandemonium. After the dance the doorman orders them thrown out. Richie lunges and the bartender stabs his wounded hand. Seth shoots the bouncer while Richie counterattacks the bartender. The doorman chuckles at the brothers, who shoot him as well. At the sight of Richie's bloody hand, Santánico transforms into a monstrous vampire and leaps onto Richie to suck his blood.

The other strippers reveal themselves as vampires and begin feeding on the patrons as the three dead employees arise. In the chaos Kate kills the doorman by shoving her cross pendant down his throat. Santánico attacks Seth, who kills her by shooting a wooden chandelier that impales her. Sex Machine and Frost dispatch several more vampires by impaling them with wood. After clearing the room, the survivors find the door barred and hear a swarm of bats outside. Richie rises from the dead. Seth tries to protect him, but Jacob says that he is beyond saving, and Seth reluctantly drives a stake into his heart.

The survivors rest while Frost tells a war story. Sex Machine, unknown to the others, has been bitten and begins turning into a vampire. While Seth and the Fullers are distracted, Sex Machine creeps up behind Frost and bites him, then Jacob. Frost throws Sex Machine into an overhead window, letting the bats in, and then turns into a vampire. Seth, Kate, and Scott escape to a storeroom. Jacob covers their retreat with a cruciform shotgun and joins them. They improvise weapons from truck cargo that the vampires have looted from past victims. Jacob, knowing he will soon become a vampire, makes Scott and Kate promise to kill him when he changes.

The group makes their final assault on the undead. Sex Machine turns into a were-rat and attacks Seth, but is killed by Kate. Jacob kills Frost and then turns into a vampire. Scott kills him, but his hesitation allows Jacob to bite him. Other vampires devour Scott, who begs for death, and Kate shoots him. As vampires surround Kate and Seth, rays of morning light enter through holes in the walls, making the vampires back away. Carlos arrives and his bodyguards blast open the door and flood the room with sunlight, killing the vampires.

Seth chastises Carlos for his poor choice of a meeting place and negotiates a smaller price for admission to El Rey. After paying Carlos, he hands Kate some cash and apologizes. She offers to go with him, but Seth responds that he is not that immoral. Kate drives away in the motor home as the Titty Twister is shown to be the top of a buried Aztec temple surrounded by abandoned trucks from various decades.

== Cast ==
- Harvey Keitel as Jacob Fuller
- George Clooney as Seth Gecko
- Quentin Tarantino as Richard "Richie" Gecko
- Juliette Lewis as Katherine "Kate" Fuller
- Ernest Liu as Scott Fuller
- Salma Hayek as Santanico Pandemonium
- Brenda Hillhouse as Hostage Gloria Hill
- Marc Lawrence as Old Timer Motel Owner
- Cheech Marin as Border Guard / Chet Pussy / Carlos
- Michael Parks as Texas Ranger Earl McGraw
- Kelly Preston as Newscaster Kelly Houge
- Tom Savini as Sex Machine
- John Saxon as FBI Agent Stanley Chase
- Danny Trejo as Razor Charlie
- Fred Williamson as Frost
- John Hawkes as Pete Bottoms
- Tito & Tarantula as The Titty Twister House Band

== Development ==
From Dusk till Dawn was conceived by Robert Kurtzman, who wrote the film's initial treatment in 1988 to create work for his co-founded special effects and prosthetic makeup studio, KNB EFX Group. In 1990, KNB paid Quentin Tarantino $1,500 to write the script as his first paid writing assignment in exchange for a commitment to hire KNB as the makeup company for Reservoir Dogs (1992). Kurtzman originally wanted to direct From Dusk till Dawn, but his lack of feature directing experience along with the film's violent and unusual story made studios unwilling to provide the $1–2 million backing he asked for. After the release of Pulp Fiction (1994), Tarantino approached Miramax and stated that his next project would be From Dusk till Dawn, albeit with Robert Rodriguez (whom he had met earlier and thought his style was perfect for the project) directing. Miramax agreed, and shooting began in the summer of 1995.

== Production ==
=== References to other titles ===
The "El Rey" hideout in Mexico was taken from The Getaway, a 1958 crime novel by Jim Thompson.

Earl McGraw became a recurring character in Rodriguez and Tarantino's works, later appearing in Kill Bill, Planet Terror, and Death Proof as an Easter egg. Chango Beer and Sex Machine's codpiece gun are references to Rodriguez's 1995 film Desperado. Seth also returns to the hotel with Big Kahuna Burgers, which were used in Pulp Fiction and mentioned in Death Proof. Seth Gecko also says the line: "All right, Ramblers. Let's get ramblin'!", a quote from Tarantino's Reservoir Dogs. Scott's T-shirt decoration reads "Precinct 13", a reference to John Carpenter's 1976 film, Assault on Precinct 13. Salma Hayek's character, Santanico Pandemonium, is a reference to the 1975 nunsploitation film Satánico pandemonium.

=== Non-union crew ===
As with many of Rodriguez's films, From Dusk till Dawn employed a non-union production crew, which is unusual for a production with a budget above $15 million. The making of the film, including the crew's non-union status, was documented in Full Tilt Boogie, released two years later.

== Release ==
=== Box office ===
From Dusk till Dawn was released on January 19, 1996. On its first week, the film grossed $10,240,805 in the United States, making it the highest-grossing film of the week. The next week, the film fell to third-highest in the box office, where it grossed $4,851,921, being beaten by Mr. Holland's Opus and Bed of Roses. From Dusk till Dawn grossed $25,836,616 in the United States and $33,500,000 internationally, for a worldwide gross of $59,336,616.

On May 1, 1996, the film was banned in Ireland; Sheamus Smith, head of the Irish Film Censor Board, cited its "irresponsible and totally gratuitous" violence, which he felt was particularly untimely in the wake of the then-recent Dunblane and Port Arthur massacres. The ban was lifted in 2004.

=== Critical reception ===
On the review aggregator website Rotten Tomatoes, 65% of 57 critics' reviews are positive. The website's consensus reads: "A pulpy crime drama/vampire film hybrid, From Dusk till Dawn is an uneven but often deliriously enjoyable B-movie." Metacritic, which uses a weighted average, assigned the film a score of 48 out of 100, based on 15 critics, indicating "mixed or average" reviews. Audiences polled by CinemaScore gave the film an average grade of "B−" on an A+ to F scale.

Roger Ebert gave the film three out of four stars and described it as "a skillful meat-and-potatoes action extravaganza with some added neat touches". In her review for The New York Times, Janet Maslin wrote: "The latter part of From Dusk till Dawn is so relentless that it's as if a spigot has been turned on and then broken. Though some of the tricks are entertainingly staged, the film loses its clever edge when its action heats up so gruesomely and exploitatively that there's no time for talk".

Entertainment Weekly gave the film a "B" rating and Owen Gleiberman wrote: "Rodriguez and Tarantino have taken the let-'em-eat-trash cynicism of modern corporate moviemaking and repackaged it as junk-conscious 'attitude'. In From Dusk till Dawn, they put on such a show of cooking up popcorn that they make pandering to the audience seem hip". In his review for The Washington Post, Desson Howe wrote: "The movie, which treats you with contempt for even watching it, is a monument to its own lack of imagination. It's a triumph of vile over content; mindless nihilism posing as hipness".

Cinefantastique magazine's Steve Biodrowski wrote: "Whereas one might reasonably have expected that the combo of Quentin Tarantino and Robert Rodriguez would yield a critical mass of nuclear proportions, instead of an atomic fireball's worth of entertainment, we get a long fuse, quite a bit of fizzle, and a rather minor blast". In his review for the San Francisco Chronicle, Mick LaSalle called the film "an ugly, unpleasant criminals-on-the-lam film that midway turns into a boring and completely repellent vampire 'comedy'. If it's not one of the worst films of 1996 it will have been one miserable year".

In Marc Savlov's review for the Austin Chronicle, he wrote: "Fans of Merchant Ivory will do well to steer clear of Rodriguez's newest opus, but both action and horror film fans have cause for celebration after what seems like a particularly long splatter-drought. This is horror with a wink and a nod to drive-in theatres and sweaty back seats. This is how it's done".

=== Awards and nominations ===
Award	Category	Subject	Result
Fangoria Chainsaw Award	Best Actor	George Clooney	Won
MTV Movie Awards	Best Breakthrough Performance	George Clooney	Won
Saturn Awards	Best Actor	George Clooney	Won
Saturn Awards	Best Horror Film		Won
Saturn Awards	Best Makeup		Nominated
Saturn Awards	Best Director	Robert Rodriguez	Nominated
Saturn Awards	Best Supporting Actress	Juliette Lewis	Nominated
Saturn Awards	Best Supporting Actor	Harvey Keitel	Nominated
Saturn Awards	Best Supporting Actor	Quentin Tarantino	Nominated
Saturn Awards	Best Writing	Quentin Tarantino	Nominated
Razzie Awards	Worst Supporting Actor	Quentin Tarantino	Nominated
Stinkers Bad Movie Awards	Worst Supporting Actor	Quentin Tarantino	Nominated

== Soundtrack ==
The soundtrack features mainly Texas blues by such artists as ZZ Top and brothers Stevie Ray and Jimmie Vaughan on separate tracks. The Chicano rock band Tito & Tarantula, who portrayed the band in the Titty Twister, appears on the soundtrack, as well. The film's score is by Graeme Revell. "Dark Night" by The Blasters plays over the film's opening and closing credits.

== Video game ==
A video game of the same name was released for Windows in 2001. It is based on events that transpire directly after the end of the film.

== Sequel and prequel ==
From Dusk till Dawn was followed by two direct-to-video installments, a sequel From Dusk Till Dawn 2: Texas Blood Money (1999) and prequel From Dusk Till Dawn 3: The Hangman's Daughter (2000). They were both received poorly by critics. Danny Trejo is the only actor to appear in all three, although Michael Parks appears in both From Dusk till Dawn and The Hangman's Daughter. Rodriguez, Tarantino and Lawrence Bender served as producers on all three films.

== Television ==
A television series inspired by the films premiered on the El Rey network in March 2014, produced and directed by Rodriguez. The show was intended to explore and expand on the characters and story from the film, providing a wider scope and richer Aztec mythology.

The series ended production in 2016, with Deadline Hollywood reporting that the actors have been released from their contracts as of October 31.
