= Lawrence Bender =

American film producer

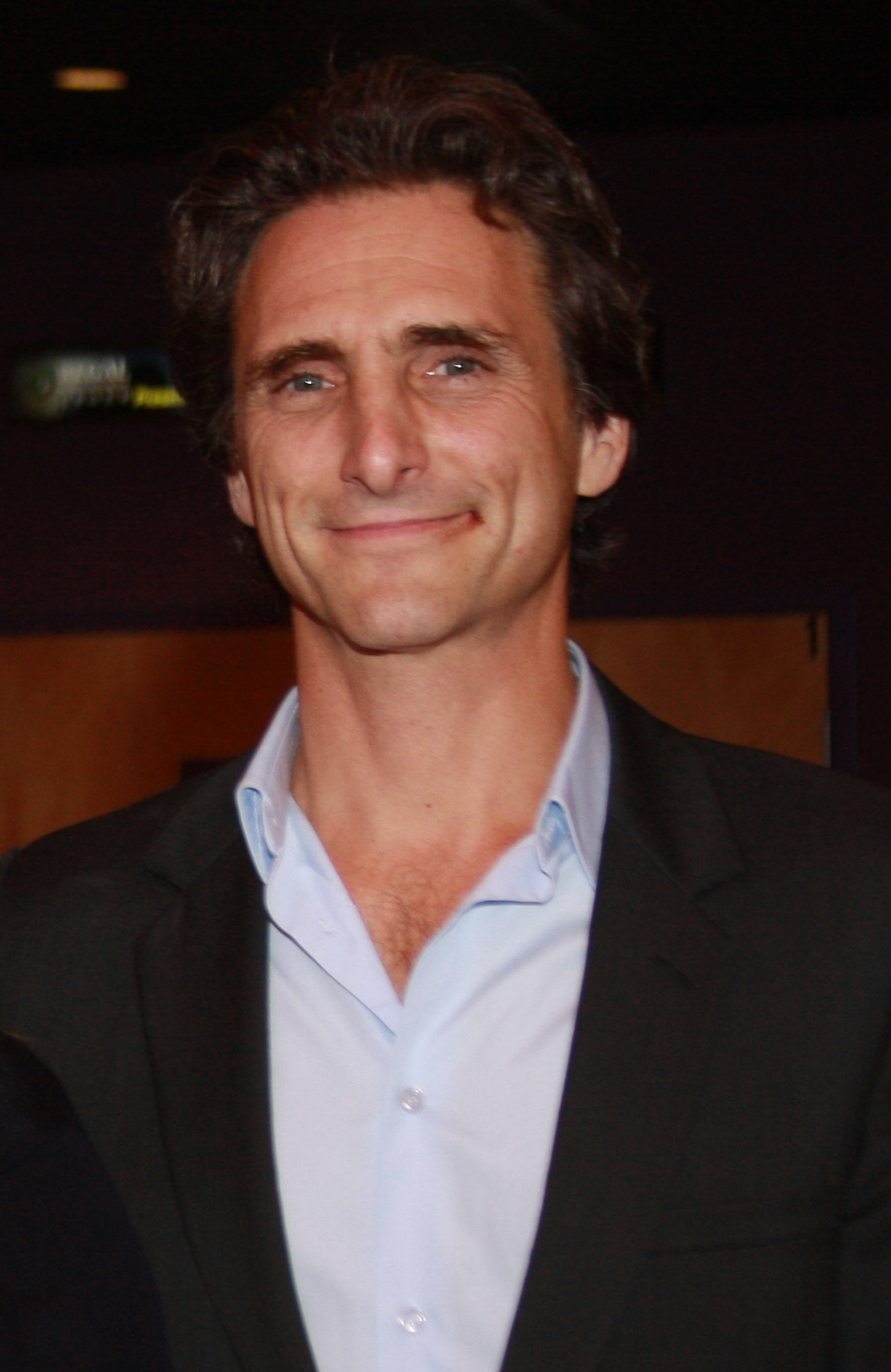
- Bender at a premiere for Inglourious Basterds in August 2009
- Born: October 17, 1957 (age 69); New York City, U.S.
- Education: University of Maine
- Occupation: Film producer
- Years active: 1987–present

Lawrence Bender (born October 17, 1957) is an American film producer. Throughout his career, Bender-produced films have received 36 Academy Award nominations, resulting in eight wins.

Bender rose to fame by producing Reservoir Dogs in 1992 and has since produced several of Quentin Tarantino's films, including Pulp Fiction, Jackie Brown, Kill Bill: Volume 1 & 2 and Inglourious Basterds. Bender has also produced three documentary films, most notably An Inconvenient Truth (2006), which won the Academy Award for Best Documentary Feature. He has received three Best Picture nominations for producing Pulp Fiction, Good Will Hunting, and Inglourious Basterds.

== Early life ==
Bender was born to a Jewish family in The Bronx, New York, and grew up in New Jersey, where his father was a college history professor, and his mother was a kindergarten teacher. He described his hometown of Cherry Hill at the time as "all-white and anti-Semitic". He attended Cherry Hill High School East, where he decided to pursue a career as a civil engineer. His grandfather had been a civil engineer, and he heard there were good jobs available in the field. He graduated from the University of Maine in 1979 with a degree in Civil Engineering.

While in college, Bender acquired a passion for dance. After graduating, Bender pursued dancing and was awarded a scholarship to the Louis Falco dance troupe. He worked as a dancer for some time before a series of injuries ended his dance career.

== Career ==
=== Film ===
In the 1980s, he worked as a grip on the syndicated anthology series Tales from the Darkside. In 1989, he produced, along with Sam Raimi, the film Intruder, for which he also co-wrote the story. After meeting Tarantino in 1990 and being given the script for Reservoir Dogs, he agreed to produce the film, which went on to achieve commercial success. Throughout the 1990s, Bender also produced Pulp Fiction (1994), Killing Zoe (1994), Fresh, White Man's Burden (1995), From Dusk till Dawn (1996), Jackie Brown (1997), Good Will Hunting (1997), A Price Above Rubies (1998), and Anna and the King (1999). He had deals with Miramax and Fox 2000 Pictures.

In the early 2000s, Bender produced the films The Mexican (2001), Knockaround Guys (2001), Kill Bill: Volume 1 (2003), Kill Bill: Volume 2 (2004), Innocent Voices (2004), and Dirty Dancing: Havana Nights. Since May 2005, Bender has been a contributing blogger at HuffPost.

On February 8, 2018, multiple news outlets broke the story that Bender was responsible for covering up a car crash on the set of the film Kill Bill that Uma Thurman claims “nearly killed” her.

In 2009, Bender produced the Tarantino film Inglourious Basterds, which was nominated for an Academy Award for Best Picture. It would be the last time Bender and Tarantino would ever work together. He also produced the 2012 film Safe, which starred Jason Statham. In 2016, he was executive producer for The Forest, Martin Scorsese's Silence and Mel Gibson's Hacksaw Ridge. In 2017, it was announced that Bender would serve as a producer for the film The Widow.

In 2024, Bender produced the film How Kids Roll.

Bender makes a cameo appearance in many of the films he produces: he was a police officer chasing Mr. Pink in Reservoir Dogs, a restaurant patron billed as a "Long Hair Yuppie-Scum" in Fresh, Pulp Fiction and Four Rooms, a hotel clerk in Kill Bill: Volume 2, and as a bartender in Safe.

=== Documentaries ===
He produced the 2006 documentary An Inconvenient Truth, which raised unprecedented awareness about climate change and won the Academy Award for Best Documentary Feature.

In 2008, Bender was a founding member of the World Security Institute campaign, Global Zero. His 2010 documentary, Countdown to Zero, featured British Prime Minister Tony Blair, Pakistani President Pervez Musharraf, Soviet Union President Mikhail Gorbachev, South African President F. W. de Klerk and US President Jimmy Carter, among others, and detailed the urgent risk posed by proliferation, terrorism, and accidental use of nuclear weapons. Bender was an executive producer for the 2017 sequel to An Inconvenient Truth, An Inconvenient Sequel: Truth to Power.

=== Television ===
In the early 2000s, Bender formed a partnership with Kevin Kelly Brown and created the production company Bender Brown Productions. The company produced the CBS Drama Dr. Vegas and the Syfy channel miniseries Earthsea.

In 2008, it was reported that Bender was working with Nine Inch Nails' Trent Reznor to create a television series based on the 2007 album Year Zero.

Bender produced the 2015 Starz miniseries Flesh and Bone. In 2017, it was announced that Bender and Brown would executive produce a reboot pilot of the television series Roswell for The CW. The CW ordered Roswell, New Mexico to series in May 2018. Bender also executive produced the 2018 Netflix series Seven Seconds.

== Personal life ==
Bender is also a passionate social and political activist and supports many causes. Bender serves on the board of The Creative Coalition. He is a member of the Council on Foreign Relations and the Pacific Council. Bender is also on the advisory board for the UCLA Institute of the Environment and Sustainability and a member of the Global Zero campaign.

In 2004, Bender was a top fundraiser for John Kerry's presidential campaign. He was also an early supporter of Barack Obama's 2008 presidential campaign. Being of Jewish descent, in August 2015 he signed – as one of 98 members of the Los Angeles Jewish community – an open letter supporting the proposed nuclear agreement between Iran and six world powers led by the United States "as being in the best interest of the United States and Israel."

On May 11, 2013, he returned to The University of Maine to receive an honorary Doctor of Humane Letters degree and share remarks during the 2013 Commencement ceremonies.

== Awards and recognition ==
In 1994, Pulp Fiction won the Palme d'Or award at the Cannes Film Festival. Bender received a producer of the year award at the Cannes Film Festival in 2001, becoming the third person ever to win the award and the first American to do so. In 2005, Bender was presented with the Torch of Liberty award from the ACLU. He was named a Wildlife Hero by the National Wildlife Federation in 2011. Throughout his career, films Bender has produced or executive produced have won a total of eight Academy Awards.

== Filmography ==
=== Film ===
Producer

- Intruder (1989) (Also co-writer)
- Tale of Two Sisters (1989)
- Reservoir Dogs (1992)
- Fresh (1994)
- Pulp Fiction (1994)
- Four Rooms (1995)
- White Man's Burden (1995)
- Good Will Hunting (1997)
- Jackie Brown (1997)
- A Price Above Rubies (1998)
- Anna and the King (1999)
- The Mexican (2001)
- Knockaround Guys (2001)
- Kill Bill: Volume 1 (2003)
- Kill Bill: Volume 2 (2004)
- Kill Bill: The Whole Bloody Affair (2004)
- Dirty Dancing: Havana Nights (2004)
- Voces inocentes (2004)
- The Chumscrubber (2005)
- The Great Raid (2005)
- An Inconvenient Truth (2006)
- The Youngest Candidate (2008)
- Killshot (2008)
- Inglourious Basterds (2009)
- Countdown to Zero (2010)
- Safe (2012)
- Alien Abduction (2014)
- Greta (2018)
- Capone (2020)
- Two Distant Strangers (2020)
- The Harder They Fall (2021)
- How Kids Roll (2024)

Executive producer

- Killing Zoe (1994)
- Snakeland (1996)
- From Dusk till Dawn (1996)
- From Dusk till Dawn 2: Texas Blood Money (1999)
- From Dusk till Dawn 3: The Hangman's Daughter (1999)
- Stark Raving Mad (2002)
- Goal! (2005)
- 88 Minutes (2007)
- The Forest (2016)
- Silence (2016)
- Hacksaw Ridge (2016)
- An Inconvenient Sequel: Truth to Power (2017)

=== Television ===
Executive producer

- Anatomy of a Hate Crime (2001)
- Lost in Oz (2002)
- Nancy Drew (2002)
- The Survivors Club (2004)
- Dr. Vegas (2004)
- Earthsea (2004)
- Build or Bust (2005)
- Flirt (2006)
- The Line-Up (2007)
- Long Island Confidential (2008)
- Seven Seconds (2018)
- Roswell, New Mexico (2019)

Producer

- Flesh and Bone (2015)
- Red Alert (2025)
