= P. J. Pesce =

American film director and writer (born 1961)

P.J. Pesce
- Born: Paul J. Pesce; 1961 (age 64–65); United States
- Education: Columbia University
- Occupation: Film director

P.J. Pesce (born Paul J. Pesce) is an American film director and writer. He is also the co-creator of the MTV cartoon The Adventures of Chico and Guapo, as well as the voice actor of Guapo and Mr. Angelo.

== Early life and education ==
Pesce was born and raised in Miami, Florida, in 1961. After completing an undergraduate degree in both English literature and architecture at Columbia University. He entered the graduate film school and studied directing under Martin Scorsese and Brian DePalma.

== Career ==
Pesce has worked as a musician, a film editor, a studio recording engineer, a film instructor at Columbia, UCLA, and USC, and as a groom at Calder Racetrack. He studied editing with Ralph Rosenblum and acting with Brad Dourif .

In 1994, Pesce and six other filmmakers including documentary filmmaker Marco Williams and Academy Award nominee Bernard Joffa (from the 1990 Best Live Action Short film Senzeni Na?) were featured in movie journalist Billy Frolick's book called What I Really Want to Do Is Direct: Seven Film School Graduates Go to Hollywood. The book followed the lives of seven young, would-be directors over three years as they struggled with the ups-and-downs of Hollywood.

Pesce was named Best Independent Director of the Year at the Hamptons International Film Festival for his critically acclaimed film The Desperate Trail, which he wrote and directed. Entertainment Weekly called it "The best Western on any size screen since Unforgiven", and Tom Shales of The Washington Post described it as "a new high point in the cable movie". It was the second highest rated cable movie of 1995, and in addition it sold over 60,000 home video units.

In his later career, Pesce directed From Dusk Till Dawn 3. Pesce received a Special Grand Jury Award for his short film, The Afterlife of Grandpa at the Houston International Film Festival, and Young Filmmaker of the Year from the Edinburgh Film Festival. He is the recipient of Grey Advertising's Student Filmmaker Award and a Presidential Fellowship from Columbia's School of the Arts.

Pesce often collaborates with fellow screenwriter Tom Abrams; they wrote Lost Boys: The Tribe (for which Pesce was also the director), a 2008 sequel to the 1987 film The Lost Boys, as well as the 2010 film Smokin' Aces 2: Assassins' Ball.
