= From Dusk till Dawn: The Series =

American horror television series

- Season one title card
- Genre: Horror; Drama
- Based on: From Dusk till Dawn by: Quentin Tarantino; Robert Rodriguez
- Developed by: Robert Rodriguez
- Starring: D. J. Cotrona; Zane Holtz; Jesse Garcia; Eiza González; Madison Davenport; Brandon Soo Hoo; Robert Patrick; Wilmer Valderrama; Jake Busey; Esai Morales; Danny Trejo; Don Johnson
- Opening theme: "After Dark" by Chingon
- Composer: Carl Thiel
- Country of origin: United States
- Original language: English
- No. of seasons: 3
- No. of episodes: 30 (list of episodes)

Production
- Executive producers: Robert Rodriguez; Carlos Coto; Cristina Patwa; John Fogelman
- Producer: Mark McNair
- Production location: Austin, Texas
- Camera setup: Single-camera
- Running time: 45 minutes (approx.)
- Production companies: Miramax; Sugarcane Entertainment; FactoryMade Ventures; Rodriguez International Pictures; Entertainment One

Original release
- Network: El Rey
- Release: March 11, 2014 – November 1, 2016

From Dusk till Dawn: The Series is an American horror television series developed by Robert Rodriguez. It forms part of the franchise of film, direct-to-video, and comics of From Dusk till Dawn, expanding on the chronicles of the Gecko Brothers, Seth and Richie, the Fuller family, and Santanico Pandemonium. The series adds to the tone of the film, with new characters and backstories, while expanding the snake creatures' Mesoamerican mythology. The series also references the Popol Vuh, drawing on its rich, mythological history and, in particular, on the legend of the Hero Twins Hunahpú and Xbalanqué to add greater depth to the backstories and to fully flesh out the characters of the show's protagonists.

The series premiered on March 11, 2014, on Rodriguez's newly launched El Rey Network. Outside the United States and Latin America, the series is marketed as a Netflix original but was removed in November 2022. It was produced by FactoryMade Ventures in association with Miramax and executive produced by Rodriguez.

The third season aired from September 6 to November 1, 2016. While the series was never officially announced as cancelled, Deadline Hollywood reported that the actors were released from their contracts on October 31.

== Plot ==
In this supernatural crime series, Seth Gecko and his violent, unpredictable brother, Richard "Richie" Gecko, are wanted by the FBI and Texas Ranger Freddie Gonzalez after a bank robbery left several people, including policemen and Gonzalez's mentor, Texas Ranger Earl McGraw, dead. Heading for the Mexico border pursued by Gonzalez, the Geckos encounter former minister Jacob Fuller and his family, whom they take hostage by commandeering the Fullers' RV. Drug lord Don Carlos reroutes them to a strip club populated by snakelike people that all must fight for food to survive until dawn.

== Cast and characters ==
=== Main cast ===
Actor	Character	Seasons		
Actor	Character	1	2	3
D. J. Cotrona	Seth Gecko	Main	Main	Main
Zane Holtz	Richie Gecko	Main	Main	Main
Jesse Garcia	Ranger Ferdinand "Freddie" Gonzalez	Main	Main	Main
Eiza González	Santanico Pandemonium / Kisa	Main	Main	Main
Madison Davenport	Kate Fuller / Amaru	Main	Main	Main
Brandon Soo Hoo	Scott Fuller	Main	Main	Main
Robert Patrick	Jacob Fuller	Main		
Wilmer Valderrama	Carlos Madrigal	Main	Main	Main
Jake Busey	Aidan "Sex Machine" Tanner	Recurring (Note: Jake Busey was listed in the title credits for the first episode of the first season in which he appeared, and was subsequently relegated to recurring cast for the remainder of the season.)	Main	Main
Esai Morales	Lord Amancio Malvado		Main	
Danny Trejo (Note: Although part of main cast in Season 2, Danny Trejo was credited as "special appearance".)	The Regulator		Main	
Don Johnson/Jesse Johnson (Note: Both actors played the same character at different stages of the series, with different ages. Additionally, despite being part of the main cast, Johnson is only credited for the episodes he appears in.)	Ranger Earl McGraw	Main	Guest	

=== Recurring cast ===
Actor	Character	Seasons		
Actor	Character	1	2	3
Jamie Tisdale	Margaret Gonzalez	Recurring	Recurring	Recurring
Manuel Garcia-Rulfo	Narciso Menendez	Recurring	Recurring	
Brandon Smith	Captain Chance Holbrook	Recurring	Recurring	
Samantha Esteban	Monica Garza	Recurring		
Briana Evigan	Sonja Lam		Recurring	
Patrick Davis	Rafa Infante		Recurring	
Alicia Sanz	Paloma Gutierrez		Recurring	
Demi Lovato	Maia		Recurring	
Jeff Fahey	Uncle Eddie Cruickshank		Recurring	
Emily Rios	Ximena Vasconcelos		Recurring	Recurring
Ana de la Reguera	Lord Venganza Verdugo			Recurring
Maurice Compte	Brasa			Recurring
Marko Zaror	Zolo			Recurring
Tom Savini	Burt			Recurring
Nicky Whelan	Dr. Dakota Block			Recurring

=== Guest stars ===
Season 1

- Lane Garrison as Pete Bottoms
- Joanna Going as Jennifer Fuller
- Collin Fish as Kyle Winthrop
- Edrick Browne as Frost
- James Remar as Ray Gecko
- William Sadler as Big Jim
- Adrianne Palicki as Vanessa Styles
- Jesse Borrego as Chet, Twister Doorman
- Sam Medina as Razor Charlie

Season 2

- Brian Cage as Snake Creature
- David Maldonado as Baltazar Ambrose
- Chris Browning as Nathan Blanchard
- Hemky Madera as Lord Celestino Oculto
- Jere Burns as Winchester Greely
- Gabriel Gutierrez as The Arbiter
- Gary Busey as Prospector
- Neal Kodinsky as J.D.
- Danny Trejo as The Regulator
- Demi Lovato as Maia

Season 3

- Natalie Martinez as Amaru
- José Zúñiga as Lord Emilio
- Lobo Sebastian as Alonzo
- Michael Esparaza as Gecko assistant
- Joseph Gatt as Skull Keeper
- Shad Gaspard as Olmeca
- Gabrielle Walsh as Manola Jimenez
- Jimmy Bennett as Fanglorious Bandmate
- Daniel Zovatto as Tommy
- Alina Vega as Fanglorious Bandmate
- Robert Knepper as Ranger Gary Willet
- Fernanda Andrade as Solaya/Itzpa
- Geno Segers as General Tatuaje

== Production ==
From Dusk till Dawn is the first scripted original series on Robert Rodriguez's El Rey network. Series creator and showrunner Rodriguez, who also directed the pilot and other episodes, stated the original film is "one of the favorite movies that I did in the past with Quentin Tarantino and one that people still ask us about today. There was so much I wanted to explore in that movie that I didn't get to. And I delved a little deeper into Mesoamerican mythologies and Aztec and Mayan mythologies and where a vampire culture could have existed back then and found fascinating stuff".

== International broadcast ==
In Australia, the series premiered on SBS 2 on July 1, 2014.

In the UK, the series has been broadcast on Spike since January 4, 2016, as From Dusk Till Dawn.

== Episodes ==
Season	Episodes	Originally released	
Season	Episodes	First released	Last released
1	10	March 11, 2014	May 20, 2014
2	10	August 25, 2015	October 27, 2015
3	10	September 6, 2016	November 1, 2016

== Reception ==
From Dusk till Dawn has received mostly favorable reviews. Review aggregator site Metacritic has given the first season a "generally favorable" score of 61 out of 100, based on ten critics.

On another review aggregator site, Rotten Tomatoes, the season holds a 75% rating with an average rating of 6.6 out of 10, based on 16 reviews. It was picked #1 on Entertainment Weekly's Must list and as one of the Hottest New Fiction Shows by The Hollywood Reporter.

== Accolades ==
Year	Award	Category	Recipients	Outcome
2015	Fangoria Chainsaw Awards	Best TV Supporting Actor	Zane Holtz	Nominated
2015	Saturn Award	Best Limited Run Television Series	From Dusk Till Dawn	Nominated

== Music ==
=== Season 1 soundtrack ===
The soundtrack for season 1, named From Dusk Till Dawn, Season 1 (Music from the Original Series), was released on May 5, 2015, through Chingon Music. The album features music by Robert Rodriguez's band Chingon (tracks 1–6) and series composer Carl Thiel (tracks 7–20).

No.	Title	Length
1.	"After Dark (Spanish Version)" (Tito & Tarantula cover; series theme song)	5:54
2.	"Hey Baby Que Paso"	3:08
3.	"El Rey"	3:13
4.	"Cascabel"	4:47
5.	"Malaguena Salerosa"	4:07
6.	"Cuka Rocka (Extended)"	6:11
7.	"It's Gonna Be a Long Day"	2:07
8.	"The Lost Shepherd"	2:52
9.	"Blood in the Sand"	1:31
10.	"Encounter in Room 207"	1:56
11.	"Border Station Shootout"	1:53
12.	"Beyond the Border"	1:57
13.	"A Lover's Prelude"	1:58
14.	"El Rinche"	1:56
15.	"Vampire Battle"	2:30
16.	"A New World"	1:39
17.	"Labyrinth of the Mind"	2:15
18.	"The Trial Begins"	2:44
19.	"Cheyenne or Phoenix"	1:29
20.	"The Pyramid and the Farewell"	3:34

=== Season 3 soundtrack ===
The third ending season song called "Monsters" is written and performed by actress Madison Davenport.

== See also ==
- Vampire films
- List of vampire television series
