= Josey Wales =

Josey Wales may refer to:

- Josey Wales (singer) (born 1956), Jamaican dancehall deejay
- Josey Wales (character), fictional character created by author Asa Earl Carter (credited as Forrest Carter), appearing in:
  - The Rebel Outlaw: Josey Wales, the 1972 American Western novel in which the character first appeared (republished in 1975 as Gone to Texas)
  - The Vengeance Trail of Josey Wales, a 1976 sequel to the 1972 novel, also written by Asa Earl Carter
  - The Outlaw Josey Wales, a 1976 Western film starring Clint Eastwood
  - The Return of Josey Wales, a 1986 sequel film starring Michael Parks
