= Mika Boorem =

American actress (born 1987)

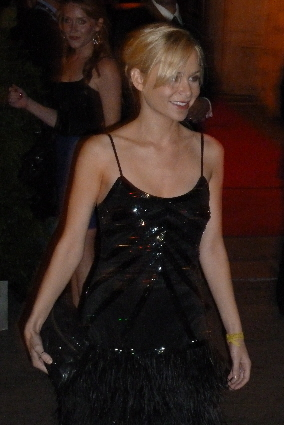
- Boorem at the 2010 Toronto International Film Festival
- Born: Mika Sue Boorem; August 18, 1987 (age 38); Tucson, Arizona, U.S.
- Occupation: Actress
- Years active: 1995–present
- Website: mikaboorem.com

Mika Sue Boorem (/ˈmiːkə ˈbʊərəm/; (Note: Boorem pronounces her name as such when introducing herself in a 2018 discussion of her upcoming film, Hollywood.Con.) born August 18, 1987) is an American actress. She began her career as a child actress, appearing on television in small guest roles on Touched by an Angel and Ally McBeal, before earning critical acclaim for her performance in The Education of Little Tree (1997). After being cast in supporting roles in Jack Frost and Mighty Joe Young (both 1998), Boorem had a lead role in the drama Hearts in Atlantis (2001), opposite Anton Yelchin and Anthony Hopkins, which garnered her further critical acclaim.

Boorem also had prominent supporting roles in the war drama The Patriot (2000) and the thriller Along Came a Spider (2001). She went on to star in numerous teen films in the early-to-mid 2000s, including the surf film Blue Crush (2002), the comedy Sleepover (2004), and the drama Augusta, Gone (2006). Boorem was a recurring guest star on the network series Dawson's Creek in 2002 and 2003. She had a central role in John Carpenter's horror film The Ward (2010), followed by roles in several independent films. Boorem made her feature film directorial debut with Hollywood.Con (2021), starring Tom Arnold and Brian Krause.

== Life and career ==
=== Early life ===
Boorem was born on August 18, 1987, at Carondelet St. Joseph's Hospital in Tucson, Arizona, to Holly (née Thomas) and Benjamin Boorem. She has one older brother, Benjamin Jr. Her father is a gemologist. She began acting in local theater in Arizona, and subsequently moved to Los Angeles with her family, where she attended Le Lycée Français de Los Angeles, a French-English bilingual school.

=== Work as a child actress ===
After appearing as herself in the direct-to-video of Disney Sing-Along Songs called Beach Party at Walt Disney World in 1995, Boorem had her first televised role in 1996 as a guest on the series Touched by an Angel. That was followed by a supporting part in The Education of Little Tree (1997), based on the controversial memoir of the same name by Forrest Carter. David Noh of Film Journal International deemed her performance as a young friend of the titular Cherokee character "delightful." For her performance, she was nominated for a Young Artist Award. The same year, Boorem had a guest role playing the young Ally McBeal in the 1997 pilot episode. She also had a supporting role in A Walton Easter, a television film spin-off from The Waltons, which aired in the spring of 1997. She subsequently had a supporting role in the Christmas film Jack Frost (1998) starring Michael Keaton, for which she was nominated for a YoungStar Award for Best Actress in a Drama Film.

She then had a part in Disney's live-action film Mighty Joe Young (1998), playing the young counterpart of Charlize Theron's character. She appeared on television again as a main cast member of the comedy series The Tom Show, which aired for one season between 1997 and 1998; in the series, she portrayed the daughter of a television producer, played by Tom Arnold. In late 1999, Boorem had a supporting role in the ensemble drama Things You Can Tell Just by Looking at Her, opposite Glenn Close and Cameron Diaz.

Also in 2000, Boorem had a central role in the Revolutionary War historical drama The Patriot (2000), playing the daughter of a soldier (portrayed by Mel Gibson). For her performance, she was nominated for her third Young Artist Award as part of an ensemble cast. She subsequently appeared opposite Morgan Freeman and Anton Yelchin in the thriller Along Came a Spider (2001), playing the kidnapped daughter of a United States Senator. The following year, she was again cast opposite Yelchin with a lead in the drama Hearts in Atlantis (2001), playing a young girl who has mysterious interactions with an elderly man (played by Anthony Hopkins) in her community. A supporting role in Penny Marshall's period drama Riding in Cars with Boys (2001) followed, and a part as the younger sister of Kate Bosworth in the surf film Blue Crush (2002). In 2003, she had a supporting role opposite Julia Stiles and Shirley MacLaine in the romantic comedy Carolina. Between 2002 and 2003, Boorem had a recurring guest role on the sixth season of the series Dawson's Creek, portraying Harley Hetson. For her role, she earned a Teen Choice Award nomination for Choice TV Sidekick.

=== Transition to teen and adult roles ===
In 2004, Boorem starred opposite Alexa Vega in the teen comedy Sleepover, followed by a supporting part in the dance film Dirty Dancing: Havana Nights (2004). In the independent drama Smile (2005), Boorem portrayed a teenager from Malibu who befriends a young Chinese woman with a facial deformity, played by Yi Ding. Critic Justin Chang of Variety deemed the film a "well-meaning but dramatically lopsided tearjerker."

The following year, Boorem starred as the lead in The Initiation of Sarah, an ABC Family television film and remake of the 1978 horror film of the same name, as well as in the television drama film Augusta, Gone, in which she portrayed a teenaged drug addict. Tom Jicha of the Sun-Sentinel praised her performance in the film, writing: "... the meatiest role belongs to Mika Boorem. The relative unknown plays Augusta Dudman, a 14-year-old with typical teenage insecurities and self-esteem problems. This makes her willing prey for a more advanced child of the streets named Rain, who introduces Augusta to the temptations of drugs and sex. Boorem handles the role as if she's in it for more than a paycheck, which cannot be said of all her co-stars." In 2007, she had a guest-starring role on the medical drama series House, appearing in the episode "Insensitive" as a teenager suffering from CIPA, a condition that prevents her from sensing pain.

She guest-starred on the series Ghost Whisperer in 2008, appearing in the episode "Bloodline," and the same year had a minor role in the drama Trucker. Boorem was also featured in David Cook's music video "Light On" in 2008. In 2010, she had a supporting part as the ghost of a psychiatric patient in John Carpenter's psychological horror film The Ward, opposite Amber Heard and Danielle Panabaker. The Hollywood Reporter's Michael Rechtshaffen, in reviewing the film, noted it as "an economical period piece that still effectively demonstrates what a skilled technician can accomplish in a single location with a compact cast and sturdy old-school effects."

=== Directing and other projects ===
In 2012, Boorem appeared opposite Kelly Lynch in the Armand Mastroianni thriller Dark Desire. Boorem was also cast in the 2013 short film Awake, which was subsequently included in the 2016 horror anthology Minutes Past Midnight.

In 2015, Boorem directed the short film Love Thy Neighbor, which earned her a Best Director award at the Hang Onto Your Shorts film festival in New Jersey. She made her feature film directorial debut with Hollywood.Con (2021), an action-adventure comedy set in Guatemala and starring Tom Arnold, Paige Howard, Devin Ratray, Brian Krause and Cody Kasch, as well as Boorem herself. (Note: Former In Her Sight editor Cara Hutto writes: "Mika Boorem is a veteran actress with over 40 major motion picture and television credits. Her directorial feature length film debut Hollywood.Con was released in 2021.")

Hollywood.Con was co-written and produced by Boorem's father, Benjamin Boorem, and its premise was partly inspired by a trip the two had taken to buy jade. In April 2019, Boorem visited Arkansas Arts Academy to present a workshop on the film industry, and students from the academy served as videographers for the premiere screening of Hollywood.Con on May 4, 2019, in Eureka Springs, Arkansas.

== Filmography ==
=== Film ===
Year	Title	Role(s)	Notes
1995	Disney Sing-Along Songs: Beach Party at Walt Disney World	Herself	Direct-to-video film
1997	The Education of Little Tree	Little Girl	
1998	Mighty Joe Young	Young Jill Young	
1998	Jack Frost	Natalie	
1999	Things You Can Tell Just by Looking at Her	June	
2000	The Patriot	Margaret Martin	
2001	Along Came a Spider	Megan Rose	
2001	Hearts in Atlantis	Carol Gerber / Molly	
2001	Riding in Cars with Boys	Young Beverly Donofrio	
2002	Blue Crush	Penny Chadwick	
2003	Carolina	Maine Mirabeau	
2004	Dirty Dancing: Havana Nights	Susie Miller	
2004	Sleepover	Hannah Carlson	
2005	Smile	Katie	
2006	Whisper of the Heart	Kinuyo	Voice role (English dub of 1995 film)
2008	Trucker	Young Woman	
2009	The 2 Bobs	Skull Muncher	
2010	The Ward	Alice Hudson	
2011	Good Day for It	Emily	
2012	1 Out of 7	Krisi	
2012	Virgin Alexander	Brooke	
2013	Out to Lunch	Madison	Short film
2015	Love Thy Neighbor		Director, short film
2016	Minutes Past Midnight	Caylie	Segment: "Awake"
2017	L.A. Player		Director, short film
2021	Hollywood.Con	Mika Harms	Also director and co-writer

=== Television ===
Year	Title	Role	Notes
1996	The Burning Zone	Little Girl	Pilot episode
1996, 1998–2003	Touched by an Angel	Melissa Houghton / Cornelia "Celine"	4 episodes
1997	The Drew Carey Show	Sarah	Episode: "Drew Gets Married"
1997	A Walton Easter	Carla	Television film
1997	Sabrina, the Teenage Witch	Young Zelda Spellman	Episode: "The Great Mistake"
1997	Ally McBeal	Young Ally McBeal	Pilot episode
1997–1998	The Tom Show	Elissa Amross	Main role
1998	Walker, Texas Ranger	Jennifer McGuire	Episode: "Second Chance"
1999	Providence	Zoe	Episode: "Home Again"
1999	A Memory in My Heart	Lily Stewart	Television film
2002–2003	Dawson's Creek	Harley Hetson	Recurring role, 6 episodes
2006	Augusta, Gone	Augusta Dudman	Television film
2006	The Initiation of Sarah	Sarah Goodwin	Television film
2007	House	Hannah Morganthal	Episode: "Insensitive"
2007	Jesse Stone: Sea Change	Cathleen Holton	Television film
2008	Ghost Whisperer	Olivia Keller	Episode: "Bloodline"
2012	Dark Desire	Erin	Television film

=== Music videos ===
Year	Title	Artist	Notes
2008	"Light On"	David Cook	
2017	"Tiny Dancer"	Elton John	
2017	"All American Girl"	Heidi Jo Guthrie	Director
2020	"Catch Me If You Can"	Travis Tidwell	Director
2021	"Cruise'"	Austin Sands	Director

== Accolades ==
Year	Award	Category	Work	Outcome	Ref.
2014	Hang Onto Your Shorts Festival	Best Actress in a Comedy Short Film	Out to Lunch	Nominated	
2015	Hang Onto Your Shorts Festival	Best Director in a Short Film	Love Thy Neighbor	Won	
2003	Teen Choice Awards	Choice TV Sidekick	Dawson's Creek	Nominated	
1997	Young Artist Award	Best Performance in a Feature Film (Actress Ten or Under)	The Education of Little Tree	Nominated	
1997	Young Artist Award	Best Performance in a TV Comedy Series: Guest Starring Young Actress	The Drew Carey Show	Nominated	
2000	Young Artist Award	Best Ensemble in a Feature Film	The Patriot	Nominated	
2001	Young Artist Award	Best Performance in a Feature Film: Supporting Young Actress	Hearts in Atlantis	Nominated	
2004	Young Artist Award	Best Performance in a Feature Film - Young Ensemble Cast	Sleepover	Nominated	
1999	YoungStar Award	Best Performance by a Young Actress in a Drama Film	Jack Frost	Nominated	
