= Little Tree =

Little Tree or Little Trees may refer to:

- Little Trees, tree-shaped air fresheners
- Little Trees (band), a Danish Europop girl group
- Little Tree, a 1980 album by guitarist Ryo Kawasaki

== See also ==
- The Education of Little Tree, a 1976 memoir-style genre novel by Forrest Carter
- The Education of Little Tree (film), a 1997 film adapted from Forrest Carter's novel
