= Watch for Me on the Mountain =

1978 novel by Forrest Carter

- Author: Forrest Carter
- Language: English
- Publisher: Delacorte Press
- Publication date: September 22, 1978
- Publication place: United States
- Pages: 305
- ISBN: 0440022029

Watch for Me on the Mountain is a 1978 novel by the American writer Asa Carter, published under his pen name Forrest Carter. It has also been published as Cry Geronimo. It is about the Apache military leader and medicine man Geronimo as he fights against the United States Cavalry.

== Plot ==
Geronimo leads a group of Apaches who escape the San Carlos reservation in southeastern Arizona in the summer of 1886. They consist of aging warriors, women and children. Starving and suffering from the heat, they wander into the Sierra Madre where Geronimo has hidden rifles. Geronimo, who is both military leader and medicine man, uses guerilla tactics to lead his men in battle against the United States Cavalry. The fighting lasts until September, when Geronimo surrenders to the cavalry scout Tom Horn. Along with the story of Geronimo at war, the novel covers 300 years of Apache history.

== Background ==
Carter began conducting research for the novel in late 1973. He told the Abilene Reporter-News that he had interviewed "several Apaches on the reservation, including some of the tribal historians", but according to historian and reporter Dan T. Carter, Carter primarily relied on books found in the public library in Sweetwater, Texas, going so far as to rent a room there for a few weeks. The book drew from three main sources. The first was the journal of Leonard Wood, a physician was a part of the Army expedition that captured Geronimo; the University of New Mexico Press published a reprint of the journal in 1970. The second was Geronimo: A Biography, published by conservationist, author, and self-taught historian Alexander Adams in 1971. The third was Geronimo: His Own Story, a compilation of the Apache leader's sayings and recollections, published in 1907 and reprinted by E. P. Dutton in 1970 with an introduction by Frederick W. Turner.

== Reception ==
Webster Schott of The New York Times wrote that the book contains "moments of poetry" when it covers Geronimo's role as a spiritual leader. Schott wrote that although Carter is insightful, his desire to cover history makes the novel suffer when it "trails off into lecture". Kirkus Reviews wrote that Geronimo's spiritual visions are the book's backbone and called the novel "less than totally enthralling or convincing but vivid, richly colored, and often fiercely effective".

There were discussions about making a film adaptation. Carter died in June 1979 while visiting his son on the way to a meeting with a film studio in Los Angeles. Danny Arnold expressed interest in adapting the novel. Arnold was quite fond of the novel and wanted to explore more serious works after producing the comedy sitcom My World and Welcome to It. He believed the novel could have great potential as a Native American version of the hit mini-series Roots.
