= The Vengeance Trail of Josey Wales =

1976 novel by Forrest Carter

- Author: Forrest Carter
- Language: English
- Publisher: Delacorte Press
- Publication date: 1976
- Publication place: United States
- Pages: 202
- ISBN: 0440092981
- Preceded by: The Rebel Outlaw: Josey Wales

The Vengeance Trail of Josey Wales is a 1976 novel by the American writer Asa Earl Carter, published under his pen name Forrest Carter. It is the second novel to feature his Josey Wales character and a sequel to The Rebel Outlaw: Josey Wales (1973).

== Plot ==
Josey Wales follows the tracks of a group of Mexican criminals into Mexico. It was published by Delacorte Press.

== Reception ==
In a review for Western American Literature, Delbert E. Wylder wrote that The Vengeance Trail of Josey Wales contains "enough scenes of torture and bloodshed to satisfy any reluctant sadist". He wrote that he would not read the first novel because it "is enough to find out that even viciousness can be handled with sentimentality".

The same year as The Vengeance Trail of Josey Wales was published, The New York Times published an article revealing that Forrest Carter was a persona of the segregationist activist Asa Carter.

== Adaptations ==
Clint Eastwood had adapted the first Josey Wales novel into the film The Outlaw Josey Wales (1976) and considered adapting The Vengeance Trail of Josey Wales into a sequel, but this did not happen. A film adaptation of The Vengeance Trail of Josey Wales was released in 1986 as The Return of Josey Wales, directed by and starring Michael Parks. The film was poorly received.
