= Original Ku Klux Klan of the Confederacy =

Ku Klux Klan organization

The Original Ku Klux Klan of the Confederacy was a Klan faction led by Asa Carter in the late 1950s. Despite the group's brief lifespan, it left its mark with a violent record, including an assault on Nat King Cole, participation in a riot in Clinton, Tennessee, and one of the few documented cases of castration by the Klan.

== As the North Alabama Citizens Council ==
=== Origins ===
The group began as the North Alabama Citizens Council, which broke away from the Citizens' Councils of America in October 1955. The new organization was based in Birmingham, while the mainstream group was headquartered in Montgomery and led by State Senator Sam Englehart. The split apparently centered around the Birmingham group's embrace of antisemitism and exclusion of Jews from membership, while the Montgomery faction professed no other aim than the defense of segregation. Carter also insisted that "the mountain people – the real redneck – is our strength".

=== Rock music and Cole assault ===
The group had a particular disdain for black music and rock'n'roll, campaigning for boycotts of black singers and the removal of rock'n'roll records from local juke boxes. A sign outside Carters office proclaimed "Be-bop promotes Communism". On April 10, 1956, seven members of the group assaulted Nat King Cole while he was singing to a white audience at the Municipal Auditorium in Birmingham. The assault was supposed to be part of a much larger attack involving one hundred members who were supposed to overpower the band and the police, but only seven showed up. On April 18, four of the assailants were sentenced to 180 days in jail and a $100 fine, the maximum for their assault charge, and three others were fined for conspiracy and weapons charges.

=== Clinton, Tennessee ===
Also that April, Adm. John Crommelin, introduced Carter to John Kasper who set up an affiliate of the NACC in Washington, D.C. that June called the Seaboard White Citizens Council. In August and September 1956, both groups converged on Clinton, Tennessee, to prevent the court ordered integration of Clinton High School. Kasper was arrested on August 27 for inciting a riot and vagrancy, but released the next day for lack of evidence.

The local school board then petitioned Federal Judge Robert Love Taylor to issue a restraining order against him for interfering with school integration. The order was served to him while he was in the middle of a speech on the courthouse lawn. After being served, Kasper went on with his speech, telling the audience of about 1,000 people that the injunction did not matter. He was promptly arrested for violating the order. He was found guilty, but held over for an appeal. While a judge mulled whether or not to grant Kasper bail, Asa Carter arrived on the scene and the crowds he gathered grew to a reported 1,500.

On September 1–2, full scale riots broke out, with mobs attacking black motorists, shots being fired at the court house, and a dynamite blast in the black section of nearby Oliver Springs. The small police department deputized a posse "home guard" which used tear gas to disperse the crowds. Governor Frank G. Clement sent in the National Guard and Tennessee Highway Patrol to restore order. Bail was granted on a $10,000 bond with an injunction that Carter cease his activities. Nevertheless, later that month Kasper addressed a gathering of the North Alabama Citizens Council, welcoming robed Klansmen and stating "We need all the rabble-rousers we can get, We want trouble, and we want it everywhere we can get it." He also called for "roving bands of patriots" to descend on any city threatened with integration. Carter and his group went to Clinton in September 1957.

== As the Original Ku Klux Klan of the Confederacy ==
=== Reorganization ===
In November 1956, the Northern Alabama Citizens Council was replaced by the Original Ku Klux Klan of the Confederacy. Thirty-five Klansmen were initiated in a ceremony in Birmingham on Nov. 15 before a bonfire of skulls where they pledged to "fight the enemies of Jesus Christ to the bitter end and after". The new organization was organized along military lines, being divided into "squads and platoons with areas of responsibility" and Nazi-style brownshirt uniforms. The group was incorporated in Birmingham the next month. On 27 December 1956, during the Montgomery bus boycott, Carter announced plans to send in troops of "Minutemen" to patrol city buses to enforce segregation. In January 1957 Carter and four of his followers were arrested for a shoot out that occurred between different members of the group after one member, J. P. Tillery, made accusations about administrative and financial irregularities. At the time of the shooting the group had fewer than 100 members.

=== Aaron castration and dissolution ===
The group's most infamous attack came on September 2, 1957. In a move to counter attempts by the Rev. F. L. Shuttlesworth to desegregate Birmingham schools six members of the group (Bart Floyd, Joseph Pritchett, James N. Griffin, William Miller, Jesse Mabry, and Grover McCollough) abducted Judge Edward Aaron from Birmingham and took him to their "lair"—a small dirt-floor house outside of Clarkesville, Alabama. There, by the glow of lamplight they performed a castration on him. The event was supervised by Exalted Cyclops Joe Pritchett, wearing a red-trimmed Klan robe. The scrotum was preserved as a souvenir, while turpentine was poured on Aaron's wounds. Aaron was left for dead on the side of the road until a motorist found him and drove him to a local hospital.

Joe Pritchett was found guilty of the crime and sentenced to 20 years in prison on October 31. The jury only took 40 minutes to deliberate the case. Judge Alta King gave him the maximum penalty, 20 years in prison. The judge stated the offense was one of the worst crimes he had encountered in his 35 years of experience. Klabee Jesse Mabry, who had participated in the assault on Nat King Cole; Bart Floyd, who was the one who actually performed the castration in order to become a captain within the group; and Grover McCullough drew identical sentences. William Miller, another recently appointed captain, and John Griffin, who stood guard outside the shack and did not know the details of what happened until after the fact, turned state's evidence and got terms of probation. Those sentenced to jail exhausted their appeals and began their prison terms in 1959.

In 1960, the parole board ruled that they would have to serve one third of their sentence – six years and eight months – before they could be considered for parole. However, the inmates began receiving preferential treatment after George Wallace became governor, and the parole boards decision was reversed in July 1963, after Wallace had made his first appointment to the board. Mabry was released in February 1964, and the others in 1965.

The organization itself dissolved sometime in early 1958. Asa Carter went on to become a speechwriter for George Wallace.

== Publications ==
- The Southerner: News of the Citizens' Council Birmingham, Alabama. Ran from February 1956 to at least October 1956.
