= The Tom Show =

American sitcom television series

- Genre: Sitcom
- Created by: Tom Arnold; J.J. Wall
- Starring: Tom Arnold; Shawnee Smith; Michael Rosenbaum; Lisa Wilhoit; Mika Boorem; Ed McMahon; Tasha Smith
- Composer: Snuffy Walden
- Country of origin: United States
- Original language: English
- No. of seasons: 1
- No. of episodes: 19

Production
- Executive producers: Tom Arnold; J.J. Wall
- Running time: 22 minutes
- Production companies: Clean Break Productions; Floating Cork Productions; Universal Television

Original release
- Network: The WB
- Release: September 7, 1997 – February 22, 1998

The Tom Show is an American sitcom television series that aired on The WB on Sunday nights from September 7, 1997, to February 22, 1998.

== Premise ==
The series focused on Tom Amross, a TV producer who moved back to his home town of St. Paul, Minnesota, with his two young daughters following his divorce from his talk show host wife, who got a job producing his friend’s long running local morning talk show Breakfast With Charlie.

== Cast ==
=== Main ===
- Tom Arnold as Tom Amross
- Shawnee Smith as Florence Madison
- Michael Rosenbaum as Jonathan
- Lisa Wilhoit as Kenlon Amross
- Mika Boorem as Elissa Amross
- Ed McMahon as Charlie
- Tasha Smith as Tanya Cole

=== Recurring ===
- Shannon Tweed as Maggie Amross

== Episodes ==
No.	Title	Directed by	Written by	Original release date	Prod. code	Viewers (millions)
1	"Tom's Back Again"	Howard Murray	Tom Arnold & J.J. Wall	September 7, 1997	K2402	3.40
2	"Bad Publicity"	Alan Myerson	Unknown	September 14, 1997	K2406	2.36
3	"Kenlon's New Clothes"	Alan Myerson	David Raether	September 21, 1997	K2404	3.52
4	"Tom's First Date"	Alan Myerson	Unknown	September 28, 1997	K2408	3.35
5	"Rival Station"	Howard Murray	Unknown	October 5, 1997	K2405	3.33
6	"Long Day's Journey Into Fights"	Amanda Bearse	Mark Torgove & Paul Kaplan	October 12, 1997	K2410	3.15
7	"Tom Lives Brownie's Life for the Weekend"	Amanda Bearse	Joe Keyes & Joe Minjares	October 26, 1997	K2409	2.69
8	"The Crown Prince of Finland"	Amanda Bearse	Maryanne Melleoan	November 2, 1997	K2407	1.59
9	"It's Jan!"	Mark K. Samuels	Unknown	November 9, 1997	K2412	2.66
10	"The White Shadow"	Mark K. Samuels	Kevin Kelton	November 16, 1997	K2413	3.54
11	"A Tom Story"	Mark K. Samuels	David Raether	November 23, 1997	K2411	2.66
12	"Maggie Returns"	Mark K. Samuels	Unknown	December 14, 1997	K2403	2.70
13	"The Talk"	Howard Murray	Unknown	January 4, 1998	K2417	2.41
14	"Tom vs. the PTA"	Howard Murray	Paul A. Kaplan & Mark Torgove	January 11, 1998	K2416	2.54
15	"The Top Five"	Howard Murray	Unknown	January 18, 1998	K2414	2.68
16	"The Centerfold"	Rosario Roveto, Jr.	Tanya Ward	February 1, 1998	K2419	2.88
17	"The Band"	Unknown	Unknown	February 8, 1998	K2420	3.23
18	"Tom's Dream House"	Mark K. Samuels	Tom Arnold & Vincent Ueber	February 15, 1998	K2421	2.79
19	"The Ticket Scam"	Mark K. Samuels	Unknown	February 22, 1998	K2418	3.27
