= The Education of Little Tree =

1976 novel by Forrest Carter

- 1976 first-edition cover
- Author: Forrest Carter
- Language: English
- Genre: Historical fiction
- Publisher: Delacorte Press
- Publication date: 1976
- Publication place: United States
- Media type: Print (hardback, paperback)
- Pages: 216
- Preceded by: The Vengeance Trail of Josey Wales
- Followed by: Watch for Me on the Mountain

The Education of Little Tree is a memoir-style novel written by Asa Earl Carter under the pseudonym Forrest Carter. When first published in 1976 by Delacorte Press, it was promoted as an authentic autobiography recounting Forrest Carter's youth experiences with his Cherokee grandparents in the Appalachian mountains. However, the book was proven to be a literary hoax orchestrated by Asa Earl Carter, a Ku Klux Klan member from Alabama heavily involved in segregationist causes before he launched his career as a novelist. Although claimed to be autobiographical originally, it is now known to be based on Carter's fanciful and fraudulent family claims.

The book was a modest success at its publication, attracting readers with its message of environmentalism and simple living and its mystical Native American theme. It became a bigger popular success when the University of New Mexico Press reissued it in paperback, and it saw another resurgence in interest in 1991, entering the New York Times Best Seller list and receiving the first American Booksellers Association Book of the Year (ABBY) award. It also became the subject of controversy the same year when historian Dan T. Carter definitively demonstrated that Forrest Carter was Asa Earl Carter, spurring several additional investigations into his biography. It was revealed that he had been a Klansman and segregationist political figure in Alabama who wrote speeches for George Wallace. Carter's claim that he had Cherokee ancestry on his maternal grandparents' side is controversial within his family.

Carter was planning a sequel titled The Wanderings of Little Tree at the time of his death in 1979. A film adaptation was released in 1997. The book has been the subject of a number of scholarly articles, many focusing on the hoax and on the impact of the author's white supremacist background on the work.

== Synopsis ==
The fictional memoirs of Forrest "Little Tree" Carter begin in the late 1920s, when his parents die, and he is given to the care of his part-Cherokee grandfather and his Cherokee grandmother at the age of five. The book was going to be called Me and Grandpa, according to the book's introduction. The story centers on the child's relationship with his Scottish-Cherokee grandfather, a man named Wales (an overlap with Carter's other fiction).

The boy's Cherokee "Granpa" and "Granma" call him "Little Tree" and teach him about nature, farming, whiskey making, mountain life, society, love, and spirit by a combination of gentle guidance and encouragement of independent experience.

The story takes place during the fifth to tenth years of the boy's life, as he comes to know his new home in a remote mountain hollow. Granpa runs a small moonshine operation during Prohibition. The grandparents and visitors to the hollow expose Little Tree to supposed Cherokee ways and "mountain people" values. Encounters with outsiders, including "the law," "politicians," "guv'mint," "city slickers," and "Christians" of various types add to Little Tree's lessons, each phrased and repeated in catchy ways. (One of the devices the book uses frequently is to end paragraphs with short statements of opinion starting with the word 'which,' such as "Which is reasonable.")

The state eventually forces Little Tree into a residential school, where he stays for a few months. At the school, Little Tree suffers from the prejudice and ignorance of the school's caretakers toward Indians and the natural world. Little Tree is rescued when his grandparents' Native American friend Willow John notices his unhappiness and demands Little Tree be withdrawn from the school.

At the end, the book's pace speeds up dramatically and its detail decreases. A year or so later, Willow John gets sick, sings the passing song, and then dies. Two years after that, Granpa dies from complications of a fall, telling the boy "It was good, Little Tree. Next time, it will be better. I'll be seein' ye."

Early the following spring after performing her Death Chant, Granma dies a peaceful death in her rocking chair on the front porch while Little Tree is away. The note pinned to her blouse reads: "Little Tree, I must go. Like you feel the trees, feel for us when you are listening. We will wait for you. Next time will be better. All is well. Granma." Little Tree heads west with the two remaining hounds and works briefly on various farms in exchange for food and shelter.

The book ends just before the Great Depression, after both of Little Tree's last companions, two of Granpa's finest hounds, die, signaling his coming of age (Little Red falls through creek ice and Blue Boy dies a while later of old age), after which he moves on with his life, always remembering "The Way" which his grandparents instilled into his soul.

== Controversy ==
Carter had been an active participant in several white supremacist organizations, including the Ku Klux Klan and the White Citizens' Council. He was also a speechwriter for Alabama governor George Wallace, for whom he allegedly wrote Wallace's famous line "Segregation now, segregation tomorrow, segregation forever." In 1970 he ran for governor of Alabama against Wallace and others (Wallace eventually won another term after a runoff), on a White supremacist platform, finishing fifth among the seven candidates listed on the Democratic Party ballot.

In the years following his active political engagement, Carter left Alabama, changed his name, and began his second career as an author, taking care to conceal his background. He claimed categorically in a 1976 article in The New York Times that he, Forrest, was not Asa Carter.

When Carter died in 1979, he was working on The Wanderings of Little Tree, a sequel to The Education of Little Tree, and on a screenplay version of the book. Twelve years after Carter's death, the fact that Forrest Carter was actually Asa Earl Carter was documented in a 1991 New York Times exposé by history professor Dan T. Carter (no direct relation). The supposed autobiographical truth of The Education of Little Tree was revealed to be a hoax.

In 2007, Oprah Winfrey pulled the book from a list of recommended titles on her website. While Winfrey had promoted the book on her TV show in 1994, calling the novel "very spiritual", she said she "had to take the book off my shelf" after learning the truth about Carter.

Whether or not Carter wrote The Education of Little Tree from his childhood memories of his Cherokee uncle and grandparents has been disputed. The publisher's remarks in the original edition of the book inaccurately describe Carter as "Storyteller in Council" to the Cherokee Nation. When Carter's background was widely publicized in 1991, the book was reclassified by the publisher as fiction. Today, a debate continues as to whether the book's lessons are altered by the identity of the author. Sherman Alexie has said Little Tree "is a lovely little book, and I sometimes wonder if it is an act of romantic atonement by a guilt-ridden White supremacist, but ultimately I think it is the racial hypocrisy of a White supremacist". In his 2023 biography of Carter, Dan T. Carter maintained that Carter never abandoned his racist beliefs after becoming Forrest Carter. He argued that Carter's preoccupation with Cherokee culture stemmed from his anti-government beliefs and wrote that Carter saw a "connection ... between white Southerners’ defense of a world of white supremacy and the willingness of American Indians to engage in violent resistance to a federal government that sought to destroy their culture."

Members of the Cherokee Nation have said that so-called "Cherokee" words and many customs in The Education of Little Tree are inaccurate, and they point out that the novel's characters are stereotyped.

In spite of the exposé, the book was adapted into a film of the same title in 1997, which was meant to be a TV movie but was given a theatrical release. In 2011, the documentary The Reconstruction of Asa Carter examined the life of the author; it has aired frequently on PBS. On June 13, 2014, This American Life aired the episode "180 Degrees", which argued whether or not there was a change in Carter's attitudes between the period from politician to writer.

== See also ==
- Fake memoir
