= Josey Wales (character) =

Fictional character

- First appearance: The Rebel Outlaw: Josey Wales (1973)
- Created by: Asa Earl Carter (credited as Forrest Carter)
- Portrayed by: Clint Eastwood; Michael Parks

In-universe information
- Gender: Male
- Occupation: Gunfighter, outlaw
- Nationality: American

Josey Wales is a fictional character created by author Asa Earl Carter (writing under the pseudonym Forrest Carter as a supposedly Cherokee writer) for his 1973 novel The Rebel Outlaw: Josey Wales (republished in 1975 as Gone to Texas). Wales is portrayed in the 1976 western film The Outlaw Josey Wales by actor and director Clint Eastwood. Wales is also featured in The Vengeance Trail of Josey Wales, the sequel to the first book, and is portrayed by Michael Parks in the 1986 sequel film The Return of Josey Wales.

== Character and background ==
Wales achieves notoriety after the American Civil War ends, due to his refusal to surrender to the victorious Northern army and his deadly reputation as a gunman. He carries two guns holstered on his belt, another tucked inside his gunbelt, and a smaller one inside his coat. He bears a scar across his right cheek, caused by a saber slash. He typically wears a gray cowboy slouch hat and a shortened trench coat. His demeanor is such that he has very little to say, and when he does speak it is short and to the point, with a quiet tone (his catchphrase being "I reckon so"). He also has a habit of chewing and spitting tobacco with accuracy, sometimes on the faces of people he despises. He is extremely skilled with his guns and occasionally uses tricks (such as pretending to surrender with a white flag or shooting the pilot's rope on a river ferry) to thwart his enemies.

Of Scottish and Welsh descent, Wales is a farmer in the early days of the Civil War, living and working on his Missouri farm with his young son and wife while trying to stay out of the conflict. Union guerrillas, called Redlegs for the distinctive leggings and boots they wear and riding under the pretense of being part of the Union Army, attack his farm, killing his family, burning his home, stealing his livestock, and leaving Wales for dead when their commander slashes him with his saber. After burying his family, a grieving Wales takes his old revolver to practice his shooting while nursing a desire for revenge. A band of Confederate guerrillas led by "Bloody" Bill Anderson rides past his farm on their way north to Kansas to fight for the Confederacy, and Wales joins them without hesitation.

For the remainder of the war, Wales fights with the guerrilla band, alongside his comrade Fletcher and a young recruit named Jamie. After General Robert E. Lee's surrender in 1865, the Union organizes a ceremony to allow the remaining guerrilla bands to surrender in exchange for a pledge of loyalty to the United States of America. Everyone in Fletcher's band (Anderson having been killed during the war) agrees to surrender, with the exception of Wales. Fletcher negotiates the surrender, but the Union authorities wait for the guerillas to turn over their arms and then open fire on them as they swear their loyalty. Wales had been watching from a distance, and upon realizing that the ceremony was a trap, he rides into the Union camp killing as many soldiers as possible. Wales believes that Fletcher betrayed his men, but he turns out to be unaware of the deception, and is held at gunpoint during the ambush. Fletcher does, however, accept a commission with the Union Army to track Wales down and either kill him or bring him in, hoping to save his friend from certain death.

Wales and Jamie, the only other survivor, find themselves fleeing from soldiers and bounty hunters intent on capturing them. Jamie, having been wounded during the ambush, dies shortly thereafter. Josey embarks on a trek to Texas, meeting and becoming friends with several people on the way, including a woman named Laura Lee, with whom he becomes romantically involved. Wales kills several of his pursuers as his trek continues, leading up to an ultimate and inevitable clash with a large militia group, who are led by Captain Terrill, the man who led the raid on his farm and killed his family. In the end, he kills Terrill and makes his peace with Fletcher, settling into a quiet life as a rancher with Laura Lee. Fletcher, in turn, persuades his fellow lawmen that Wales was killed in a shootout, allowing his friend to finally live in peace.

== Inspiration ==
Josey Wales is named after Don Josey, a Texan oil executive. Carter met Josey during George Wallace's 1964 presidential run, and the two became close friends. Josey gave money to Carter when he was having financial difficulties and helped him craft a convincing cover story when he went underground and assumed a new identity as "Forrest Carter". After finishing his novel, Carter sent a copy to Josey, inscribed with "Josey Wales is named after you. Without your help, this book would never have been written. Your friend, Asa Carter.". Carter's paternal grandmother was also nicknamed "Josey", while his mother's grandfather was named "Wales" Weatherly.
