= The Initiation of Sarah (2006 film) =

- DVD cover
- Genre: Horror
- Based on: The Initiation of Sarah by: Don Ingalls; Carol Saraceno; Kenette Gfeller; Tom Holland
- Teleplay by: Daniel Berendsen
- Story by: Tom Holland; Carol Saraceno
- Directed by: Stuart Gillard
- Starring: Mika Boorem; Summer Glau; Joanna Garcia; Tessa Thompson; Ben Ziff; Morgan Fairchild; Jennifer Tilly
- Music by: John Van Tongeren
- Country of origin: United States
- Original language: English

Production
- Executive producers: Chuck Fries; Craig Roessler; Hudson Hickman; Sara Berrisford
- Producer: Lampton Enochs
- Cinematography: Manfred Guthe
- Editor: Robin Russell
- Running time: 89 minutes
- Production companies: Fries Film Group; MGM Television

Original release
- Network: ABC Family
- Release: October 22, 2006

The Initiation of Sarah is a 2006 American supernatural horror television film directed by Stuart Gillard for ABC Family. It first aired as part of ABC Family's 13 Nights of Halloween on October 22, 2006, and is a loose remake of the 1978 television film. The two films differ in several ways. The personalities of Sarah and Patty (who was renamed Lindsay) were switched, the two are now biological sisters instead of adopted siblings, and the movie features magic as a predominant element to the plot, whereas in the original the focus is more heavily on Sarah having telekinesis. The character of Mrs. Hunter was re-written to be younger and possess a PhD, and is seen as a more positive figure in the movie as opposed to the character portrayed by Shelley Winters. The film's ending is also changed, as Sarah ends up with her love interest and does not die at the film's conclusion.

== Plot ==
Twin sisters Sarah and Lindsay Goodwin are excited to attend Temple Hill University, where they will likely join Alpha Nu as their mother Trina was a previous member. Sarah finds herself immediately drawn to Finn, a student adviser that invites them both to Pi Epsilon Delta's rush week party. At the party the sisters are introduced to the Alpha Nu President, Corrine, but Sarah ends up leaving the party in tears after accidentally spilling a drink on Corrine. Lindsay follows Sarah and accidentally breaks her ankle. They're brought into the Pi Epsilon Delta house, where Dr. Eugenia Hunter introduces herself as a friend of their mother. The sisters are surprised to find that Lindsay's ankle has been healed. The following day Corrine ingratiates herself to Lindsay during a meeting at Alpha Nu, during which time Corrine takes the opportunity to take an eyelash off of Lindsay and pocket it.

Sarah is approached by Dr. Hunter, who tells Sarah that they both possess magical powers. This unnerves Sarah, especially after Dr. Hunter later tells her that the Pi Epsilon Deltas and the Alpha Nus are mortal enemies locked in a fight of good against evil, and that Sarah is the One – a person who could disrupt the balance. Sarah is further warned that as the One, the Alpha Nu wants to sacrifice her to the Eternal Flame with the Knife of Truth in exchange for immortality. Sarah tries to approach her sister with this, who angrily tells her that Sarah has always been the focus of attention as opposed to Lindsay herself and Lindsay ends up leaving in tears. After Corrine's vice-president Ezme informs her of the fight, Corrine uses this to persuade Lindsay into joining the sorority in return for beauty and a chance to outshine her sister – an offer Lindsay eagerly accepts.

Things grow more tense after Lindsay is forced to stay in the Pi Epsilon Delta following a fire and after making up with Finn, Sarah discovers that Trina is not her true mother and that Trina actually killed their birth mother after a failed ritual. The Alpha Nus had believed her to be the One, which had been proven to be false after the Knife of Truth refused to cut her, as it will only cut the flesh of the One. Sarah also learns that the Alpha Nus are willing to kill her if they can't have her, which prompts her to try to rescue her sister from their clutches. She initially seems to be successful, as Lindsay appears to want to leave the group, but this is soon revealed to be a trap to capture Sarah and force her into sacrificing herself willingly. However everyone is shocked when a struggle reveals that the true One is actually Lindsay rather than Sarah, as the Knife of Truth ends up nicking her throat. They also find that the Knife can cut through anything if it has the blood of the One on it.

Corrine immediately imprisons Lindsay in preparation for her initiation into the sorority and kills Trina, as she is no longer of any use to Corrine. Sarah escapes with Finn and the two end up having sex in order to keep him from being sacrificed in a ceremony where the Alpha Nus will throw virgins into their Eternal Flame to keep it burning. Sarah and Lindsay are both initiated into their respective houses (Sarah into Pi Epsilon Delta, Lindsay into Alpha Nu) and Lindsay is horrified when she discovers that the Alpha Nus are intent on sacrificing her. While the Deltas cast a shielding spell to trap most of the Alpha Nu's inside the house, Sarah manages to successfully rescue her sister, almost dying in the process, and after a struggle pushes Corrine into the Eternal Flame. After they return to the Pi Epsilon Delta house, Dr. Hunter uses Lindsay's inner power to heal her and returns the Knife of Truth to its resting place, while Sarah leads the Deltas into the night to find and destroy the remaining Alpha Nu's. The film ends with a voiceover from Ezme saying "That's the trouble with fire. You never know when it's going to flare up again," as she walks off into the distance with the remains of the Eternal Flame in a small cauldron.

== Cast ==
- Mika Boorem as Sarah Goodwin, Lindsay's fraternal twin sister
- Summer Glau as Lindsay Goodwin, Sarah's fraternal twin sister
- Morgan Fairchild as Trina Goodwin, Sarah & Lindsay's mother
- Jennifer Tilly as Eugenia Hunter
- Joanna Garcia as Corrine
- Tessa Thompson as Ezme
- Ben Ziff as Finn
- Amber Wallace as Vita

== Reception ==
Cinema Crazed panned the remake as being an overly bland movie, as they felt that it was "just so lost in its own attempts to mimic a certain show about yakking women that it can’t find its own niche." DVD Talk also panned the movie as being a "glossy, largely dull retread" and recommended that fans of the original film not view The Initiation of Sarah. Commonsensemedia gave the movie three stars and commented on its amount of violence.
