= Carolina (2003 film) =

- German theatrical poster
- Directed by: Marleen Gorris
- Written by: Katherine Fugate
- Produced by: Martin Bregman; Kate Guinzburg; Lou Pitt; Carol Baum
- Starring: Julia Stiles; Shirley MacLaine; Alessandro Nivola; Mika Boorem; Randy Quaid; Jennifer Coolidge
- Cinematography: John Peters
- Edited by: Alan Heim; Michiel Reichwein
- Music by: Steve Bartek
- Release dates: June 5, 2003 (Russia); April 29, 2004 (Germany); June 8, 2004 (United States)
- Running time: 96 minutes
- Countries: United States; Germany
- Language: English
- Budget: $15 million

Carolina is a 2003 American-German romantic comedy film directed by Marleen Gorris, starring Julia Stiles, Shirley MacLaine, Alessandro Nivola, Mika Boorem, Randy Quaid, and Jennifer Coolidge. Lisa Sheridan has a cameo role in the film, and Barbara Eden has the uncredited part of Daphne. It is set in Los Angeles, California. Shot in 2003, the film failed to find a distributor and was released direct-to-video in 2004.

Miramax Films was the domestic distributor, but failed to release it in theaters. When Harvey Weinstein screened the film he told the producers, "You have a hit movie on your hands. We're going to blast this on MTV all over Super Bowl Weekend." The producers never heard about it again until 2004 when it was suddenly released direct-to-DVD.

The film began principal photography in July 2001. Kathy Bates was cast in the role of Grandma Millicent Mirabeau, but dropped out after make-up and hair tests due to the shut down of the original production shoot date. Shirley MacLaine eventually stepped in to play the role.

== Plot ==
Carolina Mirabeau was raised 'free-spirited' with her two sisters Georgia and Maine by eccentric, domineering, paternal grandma Millicent in the countryside. When she grows up, she moves into LA, although regularly keeps in contact with them.

Carolina's city neighbor, talented and witty Jewish author Albert Morris, is her best friend and confidant. She is unlucky in love, never getting beyond a third date with anyone. On Thanksgiving they go to Millicent's, where a wide array of colorful characters abound and Albert is shown to be the wacky family's favorite guest.

The girls' father Ted point-blank asks Albert if he's sleeping with Carolina yet, but he insists that maintaining the friendship is the most important. Playing cards with her, Millicent and high-priced hooker Aunt Marilyn, they discuss Daphne St. Claire's romance novels thanks to Carolina, as the pseudonym is actually Albert's.

Carolina, who works for a TV studio where she's a dating show candidates-screener, gets fired for being distracted during a broadcast. Heath Pierson, one of the last show's contestants responsible for her losing her job, asks her out to dinner. Albert comes over to Carolina's with a consilatory chocolate cake, asking her to the movies, but she already has the dinner plans with the 'all too perfect' upper class, brilliant Britton. The date ends on a positive note.

The next day, Carolina helps Georgia haul her things to Millicent's. Not finding the right moment to break the news about her pregnancy, she does it amidst one of their grandmother's typical public outbursts.

Encouraged by Albert to throw caution to the wind, when Heath comes to pick her up to see a show, she throws herself at him. Albert comes by to wish her a happy birthday, which even she had forgotten about, but she ignores his knocking.

The next morning, Albert meets Heath as he's leaving. Later, he and Carolina are in the Hollywood Bowl and he questions her decision to go to bed with him on the second date. She tells him she's invited Heath to Christmas dinner, so Albert leaves perturbed.

When Carolina complains about it to Millicent, she points out she's dense. At the dinner, Albert doesn't bring Debbie who he is supposedly dating. Heath does come, and is both met with open hostility, and taken aback by how risqué and free everyone is. He leaves early, and Millicent points out he's uptight.

Albert thoughtfully hires two cleaners to pick up after the dinner. He surprises Carolina with a book under his real name, about his great love for her. Shocked, she rejects Albert and they cut off ties. Heath also disappears, so Carolina spends months alone.

One day, Maine finally knows she must submit the lottery numbers she's been slowly collecting over the years, but as a minor isn't able to get the ticket. Meanwhile, Carolina goes to a bookstore to pick up a book for Millicent. The author turns out to be Albert, who is doing a reading from it. She gets called away before hearing too much, as her grandmother has died in a car crash.

Once Carolina is able to recover Millicent's things from her impounded car, they learn she'd been playing Maine's numbers for awhile. Her accident most likely occurred while she was going to buy her winning ticket, but Maine doesn't mind as she says winning might have brought her bad luck.

Aunt Marilyn tells Carolina that Millicent had saved her from her mother's rich parents, who'd almost had her aborted. Carolina finally sees Albert, telling him about her death, and that she saw his note about her. When she says he must have been who she'd been waiting for, he says no, abruptly leaving.

Three months later, at the Thanksgiving lunch in the countryside, the father of Georgia's baby has moved in and the whole motley crue is there. Just as Caroline is saying a few blessings, Albert shows declaring he plans on coming every year onward, and he and Carolina finally kiss.

== Cast ==
- Julia Stiles as Carolina Mirabeau
- Shirley MacLaine as Grandma Millicent Mirabeau
- Alessandro Nivola as Albert Morris
- Randy Quaid as Theodore 'Ted' Mirabeau
- Jennifer Coolidge as Aunt Marilyn
- Edward Atterton as Heath Pierson
- Azura Skye as Georgia Mirabeau
- Mika Boorem as Maine Mirabeau
- Alan Thicke as Chuck McBride - Perfect Date Host
- John Capodice as Ernie the Cook
- Barbara Eden as Daphne St. Claire
- Daveigh Chase as Young Georgia Mirabeau
