= Hollywood.Con =

2021 film by Mika Boorem

- Film poster
- Directed by: Mika Boorem
- Written by: Benjamin Boorem; Mika Boorem
- Produced by: Benjamin Boorem
- Starring: Mika Boorem; Benjamin Boorem; Devin Ratray; Paige Howard; Brian Krause; Herbert Russell; Tom Arnold
- Cinematography: Robert Murphy
- Edited by: Anna Crane
- Music by: Lendell Black
- Production company: Penni Pictures
- Distributed by: Amazon Prime Video
- Release date: January 15, 2021
- Running time: 101 minutes
- Country: United States
- Language: English

Hollywood.Con is a 2021 American adventure comedy film, directed, co-written and starring Mika Boorem (in her feature film directorial debut). Boorem co-wrote the script with her father Benjamin Boorem, who also co-stars and serves as the main producer of the film. In addition to the Boorems, Devin Ratray, Paige Howard, Brian Krause and Tom Arnold also co-star in supporting roles. The film was released on January 15, 2021, through Amazon Prime Video.

== Plot synopsis ==
Mika Harms, a struggling actress turned social media influencer, accidentally steals the identity of a film producer and is caught up between two rival film production companies who are competing to film the next big Hollywood blockbuster based on Mayan culture. Mika then travels to Central America, where she is mistaken for a Mexican cartel member. The trip is also a bonding experience with her father Ben, a gemologist who is searching for a magic jade that the film companies are also after.

== Cast ==
- Mika Boorem as Mika Harms
- Benjamin Boorem as Ben Harms
- Devin Ratray as Andy Slimmick
- Paige Howard as Veronica Lake
- Brian Krause as The Director
- Herbert Russell as Josh Lambley
- Tom Arnold as El Jade
- Nino De Marco as Mayan Priest
- Cody Kasch as Marvin Lovejoy
- Saxon Trainor as James Worley
- Robert Amico as Joseph Worley
- Preston Acuff as Hector "The Lawn Protector"
- Chad Roberts as El Jade's son
- Brittany Underwood as Jocelyn Reynolds
- Billy Bob Thornton as himself, with his backing band The Boxmasters
- Navarone Garibaldi as himself

== Production ==
The film's script is loosely based on Mika Boorem's experiences in the film industry, as well her father Benjamin's work as a gemologist. In addition, the film Romancing the Stone and its sequel The Jewel of the Nile were major inspirations for the film.
