= George Wallace's 1963 inaugural address =

Speech by Governor of Alabama in Montgomery

- Part of the civil rights movement
- Date: January 14, 1963
- Location: Alabama State Capitol; Montgomery, Alabama, US

Following his election as the governor of Alabama, George Wallace delivered an inaugural address on January 14, 1963, at the state capitol in Montgomery. At this time in his career, Wallace was an ardent segregationist, and as governor he challenged the attempts of the federal government to enforce laws prohibiting racial segregation in Alabama's public schools and other institutions. The speech is most infamous for the phrase "segregation now, segregation tomorrow, and segregation forever", which became a rallying cry for those opposed to integration and the civil rights movement.

== Background ==
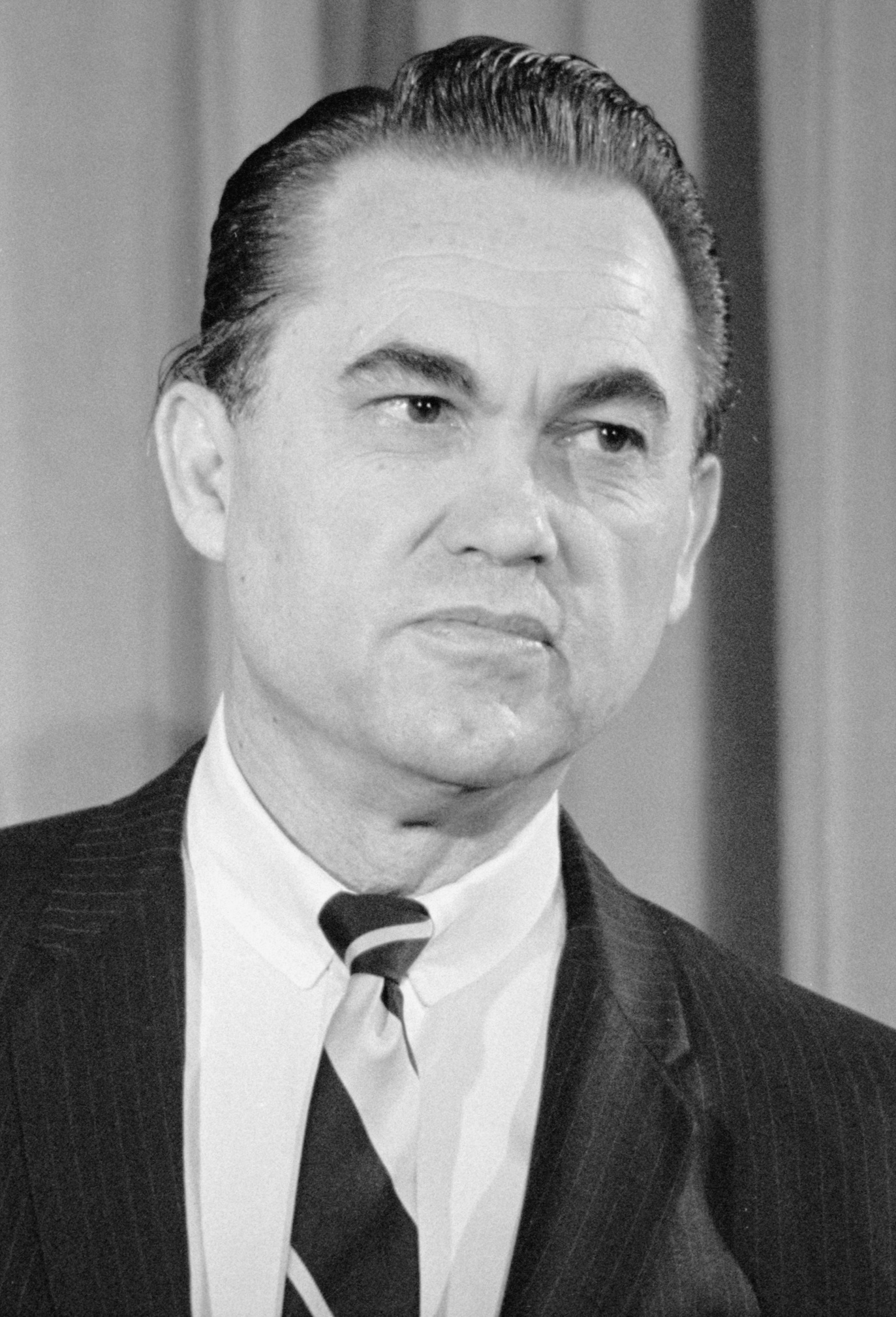
George Wallace in 1968

Prior to his first campaign for governor in 1958, Wallace, a Democrat, served as a member of the Alabama House of Representatives and later as judge in the Third Judicial Circuit Court. During this time, Wallace was known as a moderate on racial issues and was associated with the progressive, liberal faction of Alabama politics. During the 1958 gubernatorial campaign, Wallace spoke out against the Ku Klux Klan, and although he endorsed segregation, his centrist views won him the support of the NAACP. In contrast, his opponent John Patterson accepted the endorsement of the KKK and made racial issues a major part of his campaign.

Previous Alabama governors had run successfully on moderate platforms similar to the one Wallace adopted in 1958. However, the growing Civil Rights Movement, especially the Montgomery bus boycott three years earlier, had left white Alabamians feeling "under siege", and Patterson won the race for governor by a large margin.

After this defeat, Wallace determined that in order to be elected governor, he would have to change his position on racial issues, and told one of his campaign officials "I was out-niggered by John Patterson. And I'll tell you here and now, I will never be out-niggered again."

== 1962–63 campaign and inaugural address ==
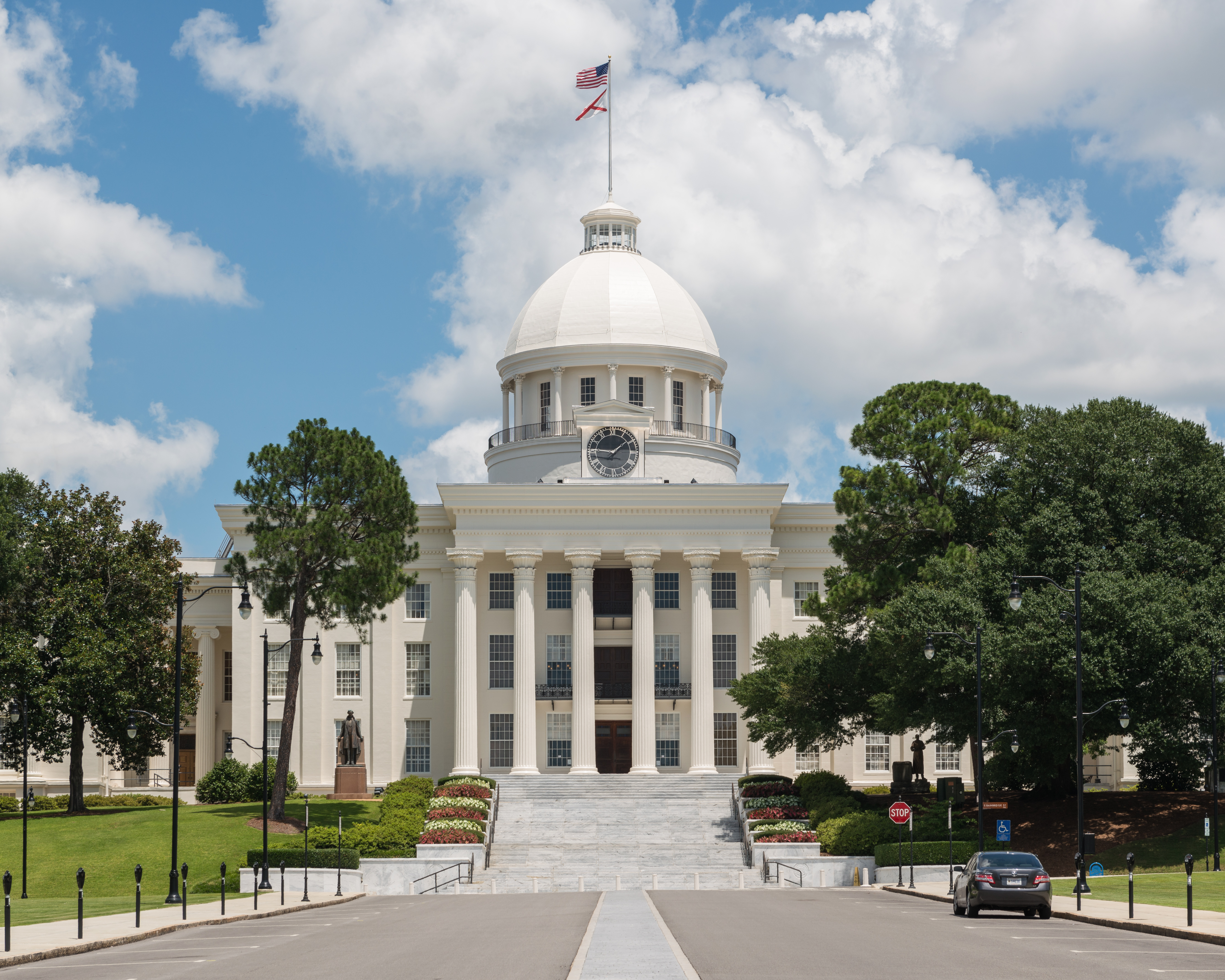
Entrance to the State Capitol, where the address was given

Wallace's new stance on racial issues became apparent in 1959, when he was the only local circuit court judge who refused to turn over voting records to a federal commission investigating discrimination against black voters. Threatened with jail, George Wallace was forced to surrender local voting records. Wallace eventually complied and released the registration documents; however, his defiance earned him notoriety and signaled his new political position. Opposition to black voter registration efforts would become a part of his platform when Wallace ran for governor in 1962.

During that campaign, Wallace blamed integration for increases in crime and unemployment, as well as racial disturbances in other states. Asa Carter, founder of a local Ku Klux Klan organization, was hired as a speechwriter for Wallace's campaign. Carter became a key member of Wallace's staff, resulting in "a new, fiery, hard-hitting style of campaigning". Due to his connection to acts of racial violence, Carter was kept in the background during the campaign; however, his speeches proved to be popular among Wallace supporters. Wallace's racial politicking and support of segregation resonated with Alabama voters and in 1962 he was elected governor, receiving more votes than any previous Alabama gubernatorial candidate.

After his election, Wallace wanted to make it clear he intended to keep his campaign promise to fight against integration. Carter spent several weeks writing the inaugural address, and on January 14, 1963, after taking the oath of office, Wallace delivered it from the portico of the Alabama State Capitol. This was the exact place where Jefferson Davis had been sworn in as the President of the Confederate States of America, a fact that was pointedly noted in the speech.

During the speech Wallace declared:

In the name of the greatest people that have ever trod this earth, I draw the line in the dust and toss the gauntlet before the feet of tyranny, and I say segregation now, segregation tomorrow, segregation forever.

Both Carter and Wallace realized that would be the phrase for which his speech would be remembered. The "tyranny" Wallace referred to was his way of characterizing the federal government's attempts at integration in Alabama. This was one of the central themes of his speech—that by implementing desegregation laws and policies, the federal government was oppressing the people of Alabama and depriving them of their rights. During his term as governor, Wallace would receive national attention as he continued to frame segregation as a states' rights issue, and integration as something imposed upon the South by the federal government.

The speech also presented the case that racial differences were similar to political or religious differences. Wallace argued that people had "racial or cultural freedom" that gave them the right to live in a culture of segregation, in the same way they had freedom to choose their political party and religious denomination. The "great freedom of our American founding fathers", Wallace claimed, was that "each race, within its own framework has the freedom to teach, to instruct, to develop, to ask for and receive deserved help from others of separate racial stations".

== Reactions ==
The racially charged rhetoric in his inaugural address secured Wallace's base of support in Alabama. It also gave him national headlines; The New York Times, Time magazine, and Newsweek all covered Wallace's speech. Wallace's national profile would continue to grow during his first year in office, and in the fall of 1963 he capitalized on his prominence by announcing his candidacy for U.S. president.

Although popular with his supporters, the sentiments expressed in Wallace's inaugural address drew criticism from proponents of civil rights as well as those who viewed direct opposition to the federal government as a strategy that was unlikely to be successful. Richmond Flowers, Alabama's newly elected Attorney General, warned that to disobey federal orders "can only bring disgrace upon our state". Business leaders worried that politicians were furthering a national image of Alabama as a place of "reaction, rebellion and riots, of bigotry, bias and backwardness".

Many who supported desegregation saw Wallace's speech as "indefensibly racist and demagogic". Civil rights leader John Lewis later recalled that upon hearing the inaugural address "That day, my heart sank. I knew his defense of 'states' rights' was really a defense of the status quo in Alabama." Civil rights demonstrators marching in Alabama later that year showed their opposition to Wallace and his policies of segregation by chanting "Ol' Wallace, you never can jail us all. Ol' Wallace, segregation is bound to fall."

Martin Luther King Jr. responded to Wallace's inaugural address with a series of speeches. In the first three months of 1963 he traveled to 16 different cities, speaking about the need to take action against the injustices of segregation. Later that year, King gave his historic "I Have A Dream" speech in front of the Lincoln Memorial. The only individual mentioned in that speech is Wallace (though not by name):

I have a dream that one day, down in Alabama, with its vicious racists, with its governor having his lips dripping with the words of "interposition" and "nullification" – one day, right there in Alabama, little black boys and black girls will be able to join hands with little white boys and white girls as sisters and brothers.

King's vision of a positive future was a sharp contrast to Wallace's demand to prolong the discrimination that had long prevented many Americans from exercising their civil rights. King portrayed segregation and its supporting rationale of states' rights as relics of the past that would not exist in America's future. This view was reinforced in 1965 when King delivered a speech in front of the Alabama State Capitol in which he directly replied to Wallace's call for continued segregation, saying he believed "segregation is on its death bed in Alabama, and the only thing uncertain about it is how costly Wallace and the segregationists will make the funeral".

== Legacy ==
Journalist Bob Ingram recalls that when Wallace first saw the "segregation now, segregation tomorrow, segregation forever" line that Carter had written for his inaugural address, Wallace was pleased, saying "I like that line. I like it, and I'm going to use it." However, later in life Wallace changed his views on segregation and came to regret his famous phrase, calling it his "biggest mistake".

I didn't write those words about segregation now, tomorrow and forever. I saw them in the speech written for me and planned to skip over them. But the wind-chill factor was 5 below zero when I gave that speech. I started reading just to get it over and read those words without thinking. I have regretted it all my life.

Regardless of his feelings at the time, the sentiments expressed in his inaugural address were blamed for creating "a climate that allowed for violent reprisals against those seeking to end racial discrimination". Wallace's defiant endorsement of segregation proved to be his most memorable piece of political rhetoric and demonstrated the fierce opposition facing the Civil Rights Movement.

US House of Representatives Leader Hakeem Jeffries echoed the speech at a rally in support of Israeli attacks on Gaza in 2014, stating "Israel today, Israel tomorrow, Israel forever".
