= The Case of Constant Doyle =

- Perry Mason episode
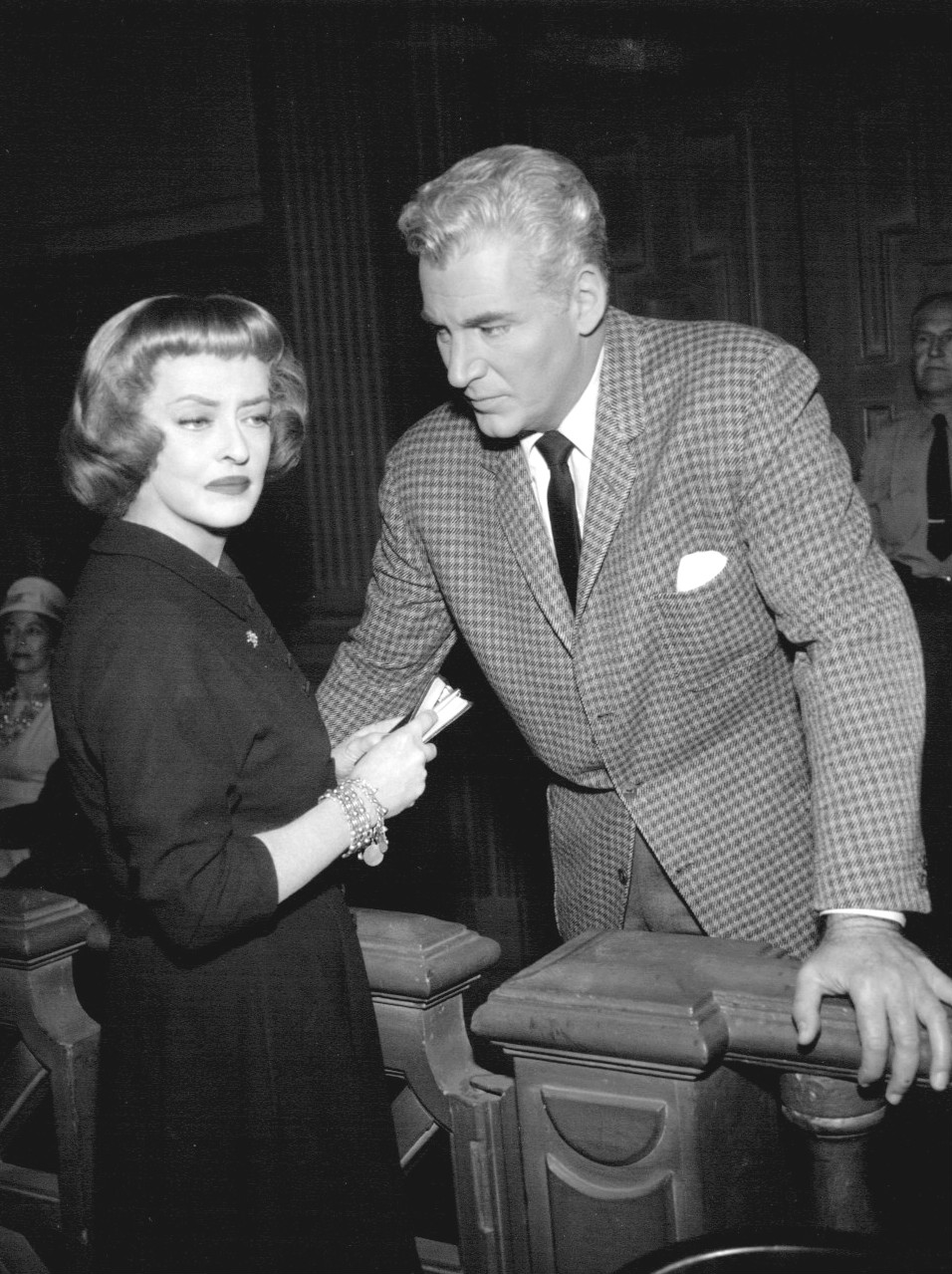
- Bette Davis and William Hopper in "The Case of Constant Doyle"
- Episode no.: Season 6 Episode 16
- Directed by: Allen H. Miner
- Written by: Jackson Gillis
- Original air date: January 31, 1963
- Running time: 50 min

Guest appearances
- Bette Davis as Constant Doyle; Michael Parks as Cal Leonard; Peggy Ann Garner as Letty Arthur; Frances Reid as Miss Givney; Les Tremayne as Lawrence Otis; Neil Hamilton as Fred McCormick; Jerry Oddo as Steven Arthur

Episode chronology
← Previous "The Case of the Prankish Professor"	Next → "The Case of the Libelous Locket"

"The Case of Constant Doyle" is the 169th episode (season 6, episode 16) of the television series Perry Mason.

This was the first of four consecutive episodes in which a "special guest star"—in this case, Bette Davis—filled Mason's role as the defending attorney; Raymond Burr, who portrayed Perry Mason, was in the hospital for surgery during these episodes. The writers had Perry in the hospital as well, and shot brief scenes in which he telephoned from his hospital room, thus having him appear momentarily in each episode.

== Plot ==
Teenager Cal Leonard is in jail for trespassing at the Otis Instrument Company and assaulting a security guard. He asks for lawyer Joseph Doyle, unaware that Doyle had died almost two months earlier; Joseph's widow and legal partner, Constant Doyle, comes to see Cal. Despite Cal's hostility and mistrust, Constant arranges his bail.

It turns out that Cal's late father, an engineer for Otis who had died from alcoholism, had invented a device that made the company millions but was only paid $2000 for it. Cal believed that his father had been cheated, and that Cal's cousin Steven Arthur, who also worked for Otis, was responsible for it. Cal had been put up to breaking into Steven's office by Mrs. Letty Arthur, who wanted to find out where Steven had been hiding money from her; while Cal was there, he found a date book which he believed contained proof that Steven had stolen money that rightfully belonged to his father. Later, while being questioned by Constant, Letty claims that Joseph Doyle, while acting as legal consultant to Otis, was actually the one responsible for swindling Cal's father.

After discovering the break-in, Steven and his boss Lawrence Otis arrange for Cal to meet Steven at Otis' house, where Steven offers him $2000 for his father's work. This only angers Cal, and the two of them scuffle; Cal is knocked out, and when he awakens he finds that Steven had been stabbed to death. The police arrest Cal.

In the courtroom, Constant brings the truth to light by pointing out something irregular about how Steven's body was dressed, and by explaining the true meaning of one of the entries in Steven's date book. The real murderer is exposed, and Joseph's reputation is restored.

Later, at Constant's office, she suggests that she and Cal go out for a steak dinner. They leave and close the door; Constant opens it again and says into the empty office, "Good night, Joe," and closes it again.

== Notes ==
- The three episodes that followed this one, which also had guest stars for defenders, were:
  - "The Case of the Libelous Locket," guest-starring Michael Rennie
  - "The Case of the Two-Faced Turn-a-bout," guest-starring Hugh O'Brian
  - "The Case of the Surplus Suitor," guest-starring Walter Pidgeon
- This was one of only three episodes whose titles didn't begin with "The Case of the"; the other two were "The Case of Paul Drake's Dilemma" (season 3, episode 6) and "The Case of a Place Called Midnight" (season 8, episode 8).
