= The Rebel Outlaw: Josey Wales =

Book by Asa Earl Carter

- Author: Forrest Carter
- Language: English
- Genre: Western
- Published: 1973
- Publisher: Whippoorwill Publishers
- Publication place: United States
- OCLC: 811595
- Followed by: The Vengeance Trail of Josey Wales

The Rebel Outlaw: Josey Wales is a 1973 American Western novel (also titled Gone to Texas in later editions) written by Asa Earl Carter (under the pen name Forrest Carter). It was adapted into the film The Outlaw Josey Wales directed by and starring Clint Eastwood. The novel was republished in 1975 under the title Gone to Texas.

Wales was portrayed by Michael Parks in the 1986 sequel to the film The Return of Josey Wales.

== Plot ==
Josey Wales, a Missouri farmer, seeks vengeance when his family is murdered by a gang of Unionists during the American Civil War by joining a band of Confederate guerrillas. At the war's end, he refuses to surrender to the victorious Northern forces and instead becomes an outlaw. He then sets out to make a new life for himself, all while trying to outrun the men seeking to hunt him down.

== Background and publication ==
Carter had a lifelong fascination with Confederate guerillas and outlaws and idolized Jesse James in particular. During his career as a radio broadcaster, he sometimes delivered lectures about these figures and the Bleeding Kansas conflict in general. In one broadcast, he described James as a "symbol of hope to the barefooted southern woman" and an "angel of miracles to the southern man that they could rise up and achieve victory over tyranny, over military occupation" and insisted the man "was no outlaw."

Carter began writing the novel some time around 1967, when he was still working as a political operative. He finished the first hundred pages of the novel in 1973, after he had moved to St. George Island and established a new cover identity as Forrest Carter. He sent his manuscript to various publishers but was largely ignored. However, the editor of William Morris Agency's Literary Department, Rhonda Weyr, expressed interest in the novel and encouraged him to give them the final manuscript. Carter finished the novel in October and sent Weyr the final manuscript as requested. Weyr then sent a copy to Eleanor Friede, an editor at Delacorte Books. Friede was enthusiastic about the book and sent Carter a contract with an advance of $5,000, a generous sum for first time authors.
