= Richard Friedenberg =

American film director and screenwriter

- Born: United States
- Occupation(s): Screenwriter, film director

Richard Friedenberg is an American screenwriter and film director. He wrote the screenplay for A River Runs Through It (1992), starring Brad Pitt, for which he was nominated for an Academy Award, and the screenplay for the Hallmark Hall of Fame television film Promise (1986), starring James Garner and James Woods, for which he won an Emmy Award. He also wrote the screenplay for Dying Young starring Julia Roberts and wrote and directed The Education of Little Tree (1997).

== Career ==
=== Independent feature films & TV movies ===
In the mid-1970s, Friedenberg directed The Adventures of Frontier Fremont and The Life and Times of Grizzly Adams for the Utah-based production company Schick Sunn Classic Pictures, famed for four-walling their films instead of distributing them conventionally. In 1978, he directed the TV movie The Deerslayer, an adaptation of the James Fenimore Cooper novel, for the same company. Notably, it was the screen debut of 20-year-old Madeleine Stowe, who later played the female lead in a more respectable Cooper adaptation, Michael Mann's The Last of the Mohicans.

Still working for Schick Sunn, Friedenberg directed the kitschy cult classic "documentary" The Bermuda Triangle, based on Charles Berlitz's 1974 book.

In 1986, two years before the release of the strikingly similar Rain Man, Friedenberg wrote the Hallmark Hall of Fame entry Promise, in which a carefree salesman takes charge of his epileptic, schizophrenic brother in the wake of a parent's death. Friedenberg won an Emmy for his screenplay.

=== A River Runs Through It ===
In the late 1980s, Robert Redford approached Friedenberg to adapt Norman Maclean's memoir A River Runs Through It. Upon reading the wispy book, Friedenberg lamented "it was not a movie." In his preface to the published screenplay, Friedenberg details his research into the facts of Maclean's life and that of his brother Paul (played in the movie by Brad Pitt). Friedenberg used the supplemental information to enhance the original narrative, which was deemed too spare for a feature film.

=== Unbroken: Path to Redemption ===
In 2018, Friedenberg wrote (with Ken Hixon) the screenplay for Unbroken: Path to Redemption, the faith-based follow-up to Angelina Jolie's secular-skewing Unbroken (2014). The sequel was adapted from the same source material as the original film but featured none of the main cast.
