= The Outlaw Josey Wales =

1976 film by Clint Eastwood

- Theatrical release poster
- Directed by: Clint Eastwood
- Screenplay by: Phil Kaufman; Sonia Chernus
- Based on: Gone to Texas by Forrest Carter
- Produced by: Robert Daley
- Starring: Clint Eastwood; Chief Dan George; Sondra Locke; Bill McKinney; John Vernon
- Cinematography: Bruce Surtees
- Edited by: Ferris Webster
- Music by: Jerry Fielding
- Production company: The Malpaso Company
- Distributed by: Warner Bros.
- Release date: June 30, 1976
- Running time: 135 minutes
- Country: United States
- Language: English
- Budget: $3.7 million
- Box office: $31.8 million

The Outlaw Josey Wales is a 1976 American revisionist Western film set during and after the American Civil War. It was directed by and starred Clint Eastwood (as Josey Wales), with Chief Dan George, Sondra Locke, Bill McKinney, and John Vernon. During the Civil War, Josey Wales is a Missouri farmer-turned-soldier, who seeks to avenge the deaths of his family and gains a reputation as a feared gunfighter. At the end of the war, his comrades are slaughtered in an act of treachery, and Wales becomes an outlaw, pursued by bounty hunters and soldiers.

The film was adapted by Sonia Chernus and Philip Kaufman from author Asa Earl "Forrest" Carter's 1972 novel The Rebel Outlaw: Josey Wales (republished, as shown in the movie's opening credits, as Gone to Texas). The film was a commercial success, earning $31.8 million against a $3.7 million budget. In 1996, the film was selected for preservation in the United States National Film Registry by the Library of Congress as being "culturally, historically, or aesthetically significant".

Josey Wales was portrayed by Michael Parks in the film's 1986 sequel, The Return of Josey Wales. His wife Laura Lee was played by Mary Ann Averett in the sequel.

== Plot ==
Missouri in the American Civil War is a border state with both Union and Confederate sympathizers. It sends armies, generals, and supplies to both sides, has dual competing governments, and endures a bloody neighbor-against-neighbor intrastate war within the larger national war. As part of this fighting, the wife and son of Missouri farmer Josey Wales are murdered by pro-Union paramilitaries led by the brutal Captain Terrill. With his farm burned down and nothing else to live for, a hardened Wales joins a group of pro-Confederate bushwhackers under the command of William T. Anderson, attacking the Union Army and pro-Union sympathizers.

After the war ends in 1865, Wales's superior and mentor Fletcher persuades his men to surrender, having been promised amnesty by Union Senator Jim Lane. However, Terrill's men massacre the bushwhackers as they swear an oath of allegiance, with Wales, Fletcher, and a young man named Jamie being the only survivors. Wales and Jamie flee, and Lane orders Fletcher at gunpoint to track them down, promising a $5,000 bounty. A mortally wounded Jamie helps Wales kill two bounty hunters before dying.

Wales flees to Texas and becomes friends with a Cherokee Indian cavalry veteran named Lone Watie, who informs Wales that Confederate General Joseph O. Shelby is fleeing to Mexico and suggests they do likewise. Wales picks up another companion in Navajo drifter Little Moonlight, and rescues elderly Kansan widow Sarah Turner and her granddaughter Laura Lee from marauding Comancheros. At the town of Santo Rio, two employees of Turner's deceased son Tom, Travis Cobb and Chato, also join the group. Wales locates Tom's abandoned ranch and settles down there. Discovering that Travis and Chato have been kidnapped by Comanche chief Ten Bears, he rides into the chief's camp and negotiates the return of the two men; an impressed Ten Bears becomes blood brothers with Wales.

A bounty hunter who previously survived a gunfight with Wales leads Terrill and his men to Santo Rio. The following morning, Terrill orders an attack on the ranch only to be repelled by Wales' companions in a bloody shootout. Wounded and out of ammunition, Wales chases Terrill back to Santo Rio and goads him into drawing his saber, before grabbing the blade's hilt and running it through him. Returning to the town saloon, Wales discovers its patrons telling Fletcher, accompanied by two Texas Rangers, that an outlaw named Josey Wales was recently killed in Monterrey by five gunmen. The Rangers accept the story and leave, while Fletcher pretends not to recognize Wales, and tells him he will go to Mexico himself to look for Wales and tell him the war is over. Wales responds by stating, "I reckon so. I guess we all died a little in that damned war." He then rides off back to the ranch.

== Cast ==
- Clint Eastwood as Josey Wales
- Chief Dan George as Lone Watie
- Sondra Locke as Laura Lee Turner
- Bill McKinney as Captain Terrill
- John Vernon as Fletcher
- Paula Trueman as Grandma Sarah Turner
- Sam Bottoms as Jamie
- Geraldine Keams as Little Moonlight
- Woodrow Parfrey as Percy Long
- Joyce Jameson as Rose
- Sheb Wooley as Travis Cobb
- Royal Dano as Ten Spot
- Matt Clark as Kelly
- John Verros as Chato
- Will Sampson as Ten Bears
- William O'Connell as Sim Carstairs
- Madeleine Taylor Holmes as Grannie Hawkins
- John Quade as Ciril E. Forebaugh
- Frank Schofield as Senator James Henry Lane
- Buck Kartalian as Shopkeeper
- Len Lesser as Abe
- Doug McGrath as Lige
- John Russell as William "Bloody Bill" Anderson
- Charles Tyner as Zukie Limmer
- Bruce M. Fischer as Yoke
- John Mitchum as Al
- John Chandler as First Bounty Hunter
- Tom Roy Lowe as Second Bounty Hunter
- Clay Tanner as First Texas Ranger
- Bob Hoy as Second Texas Ranger
- Richard Farnsworth as Grady P. Merideth

== Production ==
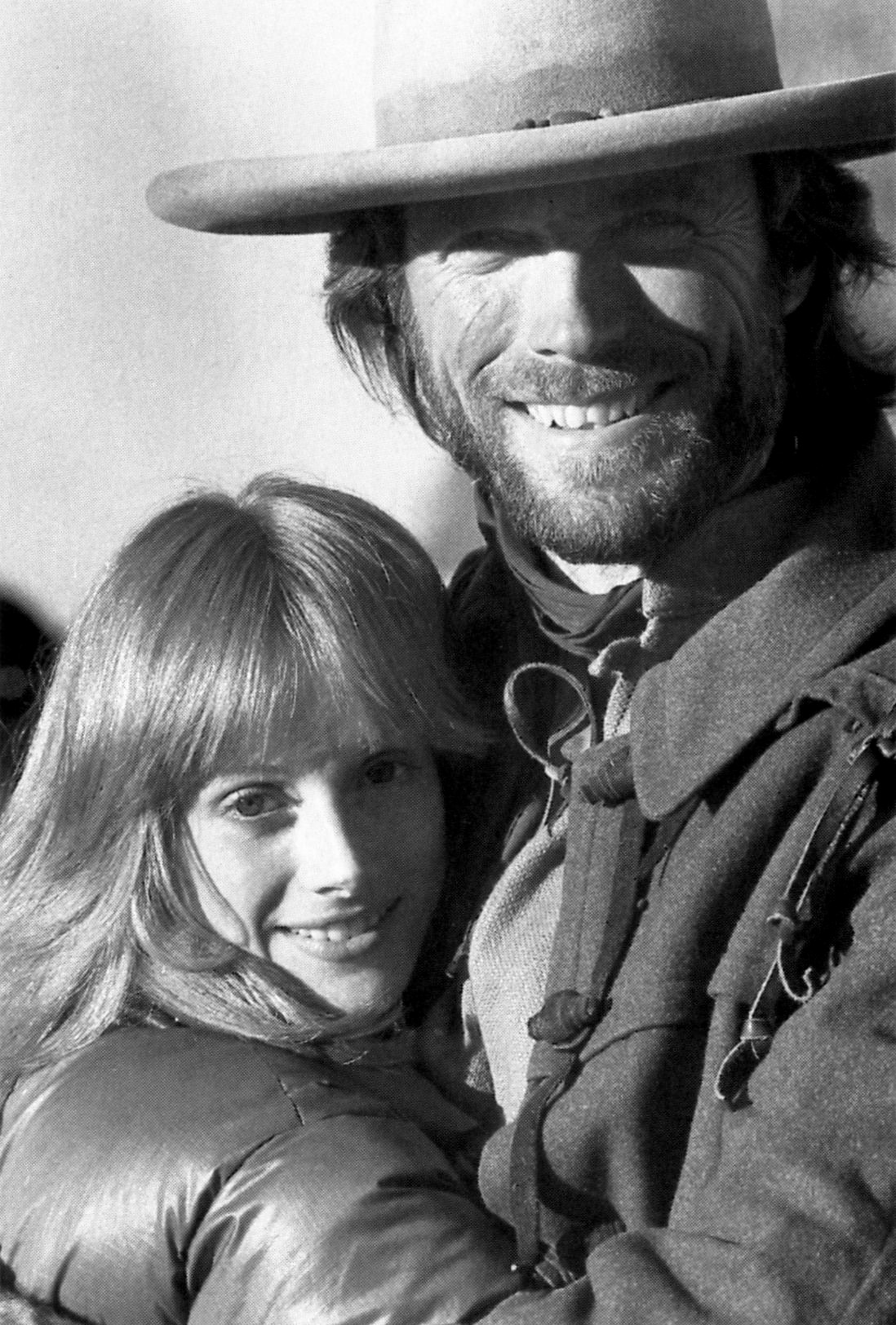
Locke and Eastwood in 1975 during the movie's filming

The Outlaw Josey Wales was inspired by a 1972 novel by supposedly Cherokee writer Forrest Carter, alias of former KKK leader and segregationist speech writer of George Wallace, Asa Earl Carter, an identity that was exposed in part due to the success of the film, and was originally titled The Rebel Outlaw: Josey Wales and later retitled Gone to Texas. The script was worked on by Sonia Chernus and producer Robert Daley at Malpaso, and Clint Eastwood himself paid some of the money to obtain the screen rights. Michael Cimino and Philip Kaufman later oversaw the writing of the script, aiding Chernus. Kaufman wanted the film to stay as close to the novel as possible in style and retained many of the mannerisms in Josey Wales' character that Eastwood displayed on screen, such as his distinctive diction with words like "reckon", "hoss" (instead of "horse"), and "ye" (instead of "you"), and spitting tobacco juice on animals and victims. The characters of Wales, the Cherokee chief Lone Watie, Navajo woman Little Moonlight, and the old settler woman Sarah Turner and her granddaughter Laura Lee all appeared in the novel. On the other hand, Kaufman was less happy with the novel's political stance; he felt that it had been "written by a crude fascist" and that "the man's hatred of government was insane". He also felt that element of the script needed to be severely toned down, but he later said, "Clint didn't, and it was his film". Kaufman was later fired by Eastwood, who took over the film's direction himself.

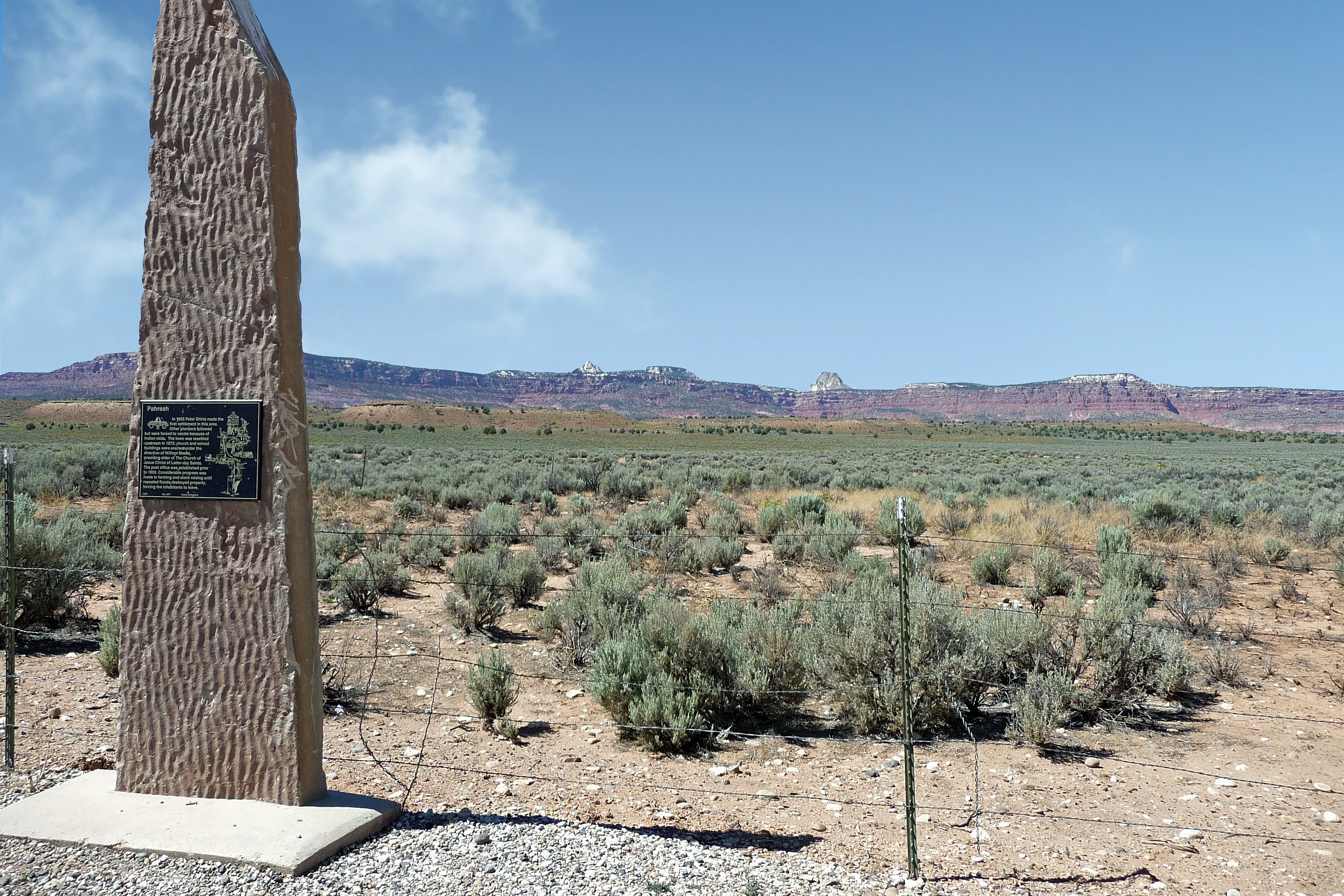
Paria site in Utah, filming location of the film

Cinematographer Bruce Surtees, James Fargo, and Fritz Manes scouted for locations and eventually found sites in Page, Arizona, Tucson, Arizona, Kanab, Utah, and Oroville, California even before they saw the final script. The movie was shot in DeLuxe Color and Panavision. Kaufman cast Chief Dan George, who had been nominated for an Academy Award for Best Supporting Actor in Little Big Man, as the old Cherokee Lone Watie. Sondra Locke, also a previous Academy Award nominee, was cast by Eastwood against Kaufman's wishes as Laura Lee, the granddaughter of the old settler woman Sarah (Paula Trueman); at 32, she was a decade older than the character. (Note: Locke (1944–2018) debuted onscreen in her mid-20s but always lied about how old she was, even going so far as to refer to herself as a "child star". The late actress is considered a paradigm of how easy it was in pre-internet times for celebrities to deceive the public, as there was no way to fact-check.) This marked the beginning of a professional and domestic relationship between Eastwood and Locke that spanned six films and lasted into the late 1980s. Ferris Webster was hired as the film's editor and Jerry Fielding as composer.

In June 1975, Eastwood was announced as starring in the film, with a scheduled Bicentennial Celebration release. Principal photography began on October 6, 1975. A rift between Eastwood and Kaufman developed during the filming. Kaufman insisted on filming with a meticulous attention to detail, which caused disagreements with Eastwood, not to mention the attraction the two shared towards Locke, who was still married to Gordon Anderson, and apparent jealousy on Kaufman's part in regard to their emerging relationship. One evening, Kaufman insisted on finding a beer can as a prop to be used in a scene, but while he was absent, Eastwood ordered Surtees to quickly shoot the scene, as light was fading, and then drove away, leaving before Kaufman had returned. On October 24, 1975, Kaufman was fired at Eastwood's command by producer Bob Daley. The sacking caused an outrage among the Directors Guild of America and other important Hollywood executives, since the director had already worked hard on the film, including completing all of the pre-production. Pressure mounted on Warner Bros. and Eastwood to back down, and their refusal to do so resulted in a fine, reported to be around $60,000, for the violation. This resulted in the Director's Guild passing a new rule, known as "the Eastwood Rule", which prohibits an actor or producer from firing the director and then personally taking on the director's role. From then on, the film was directed by Eastwood himself with Daley as the second-in-command. With Kaufman's planning already in place, the team was able to finish making the film efficiently. Filming ended on December 6, 1975.

== Reception ==
=== Critical response ===
"Eastwood is such a taciturn and action-oriented performer that it's easy to overlook the fact that he directs many of his movies—and many of the best, most intelligent ones. Here, with the moody, gloomily beautiful, photography of Bruce Surtees, he creates a magnificent Western feeling."

— Roger Ebert

Upon release in August 1976, The Outlaw Josey Wales was widely acclaimed by critics, many of whom saw Eastwood's role as an iconic one, relating it with much of America's ancestral past and the destiny of the nation after the American Civil War. The film was pre-screened at the Sun Valley Center for the Arts and Humanities in Idaho in a six-day conference entitled Western Movies: Myths and Images. Academics such as Bruce Jackson, critics such as Jay Cocks and Arthur Knight and directors such as King Vidor, Henry King, William Wyler, and Howard Hawks were invited to the screening. Time magazine named the film one of the year's top 10. Roger Ebert compared the nature and vulnerability of Eastwood's portrayal of Josey Wales with his "Man with No Name" character in the Dollars Trilogy and praised the atmosphere of the film. On The Merv Griffin Show, Orson Welles lauded the film, calling Eastwood "one of America's finest directors".

Review aggregator Rotten Tomatoes retrospectively gave the film a 91% approval rating based on 46 reviews. The site's critical consensus reads with a mean of 8.3 of a possible 10, "Recreating the essence of his iconic Man With No Name in a post-Civil War Western, director Clint Eastwood delivered the first of his great revisionist works of the genre." Metacritic, which uses a weighted average, assigned the film a score of 69 out of 100, based on 9 critics, indicating "generally favorable" reviews.

=== Awards ===
The Outlaw Josey Wales was nominated for the Academy Award for Original Music Score at the 49th Academy Awards. In 1996, it was deemed "culturally, historically, or aesthetically significant" by the United States Library of Congress and selected for preservation in the National Film Registry. It was also one of the few Western films to receive critical and commercial success in the 1970s at a time when the Western was thought to be dying as a major genre in Hollywood.

== Meaning ==
In 2011, Eastwood called The Outlaw Josey Wales an anti-war film.

As for Josey Wales, I saw the parallels to the modern day at that time. Everybody gets tired of it, but it never ends. A war is a horrible thing, but it's also a unifier of countries... Man becomes his most creative during war. Look at the amount of weaponry that was made in four short years of World War II—the amount of ships and guns and tanks and inventions and planes and P-38s and P-51s, and just the urgency and the camaraderie, and the unifying. But that's kind of a sad statement on mankind, if that's what it takes.

== Bibliography ==
- McGilligan, Patrick (1999). Clint: The Life and Legend. London: HarperCollins. ISBN 0-00-638354-8.
- Munn, Michael (1992). Clint Eastwood: Hollywood's Loner. London: Robson Books. ISBN 0-86051-790-X.
