= The Education of Little Tree (film) =

- Theatrical poster
- Directed by: Richard Friedenberg
- Screenplay by: Richard Friedenberg; Earl Hamner, Jr.; Don Sipes
- Based on: The Education of Little Tree by Asa Earl Carter (as Forrest Carter)
- Produced by: Jake Eberts
- Starring: James Cromwell; Tantoo Cardinal; Joseph Ashton; Graham Greene
- Cinematography: Anastas Michos
- Edited by: Jere Huggins; Wayne Wahrman
- Music by: Mark Isham
- Production company: Allied Filmmakers
- Distributed by: Paramount Pictures
- Release date: December 25, 1997
- Running time: 112 minutes
- Country: United States
- Language: English
- Box office: $323,411

The Education of Little Tree is a 1997 American drama film written and directed by Richard Friedenberg, and starring James Cromwell, Tantoo Cardinal, Joseph Ashton and Graham Greene. It is based on the controversial 1976 fictional memoir of the same title by Asa Earl Carter (writing pseudonymously as "Forrest Carter") about an orphaned boy raised by his paternal Scottish-descent grandfather and Cherokee grandmother in the Great Smoky Mountains.

Writer-director Friedenberg co-adapted the screenplay for the film alongside Earl Hamner Jr. and Don Sipes, shortly after completing his adaptation for Robert Redford's A River Runs Through It (1992). In the United States, the film was given a limited release through Paramount Pictures on Christmas Day 1997, less than one week after the release of Paramount's record-breaking box-office hit Titanic (1997), and grossed $323,411 domestically.

Friedenberg was nominated for a Humanitas Prize for Best Feature Film, while Cardinal and Greene both won First Americans in the Arts Awards for their performances. The film also nominated for three Young Artist Awards, winning two—one for Ashton's performance, and a Jackie Coogan Award for best feature.

== Plot ==
In the 1930s, an eight-year-old boy who is given the Native American name "Little Tree" was being raised alone by his mother, having been widowed by war, and is left an orphan when she dies of illness. His white mother's sister comes to take him but his paternal grandfather and grandmother, whose ancestors had escaped from the Trail of Tears and hidden in the Great Smoky Mountains, arrive and take the boy to live with them. In his grandparents' care, the boy learns about his heritage as a Native American through them and their Cherokee friend Willow John. Little Tree is not only taught how to live the Native way as one with the Earth but also to 'learn a trade' passed down through his grandpa's Scottish heritage, whiskey making. This leads to conflict with professional still thieves.

A complaint filed with child services by his white aunt gives reason for the government to take him into custody. Little Tree is removed from his home by the government and placed in the Notched Gap Indian School, a fictional Native American boarding school whose mission is to reform Native children and make them assimilate into the dominant white culture by stripping him of his Native heritage. Little Tree's grandfather, made aware of his desire to go home through the help of Willow John, soon rescues him and takes him home. Later, Little Tree is orphaned once again when his Grandfather dies and his Grandmother follows soon after. Willow John takes him under his wing to learn more of the Cherokee way, and the story is told into adulthood by reminiscences.

== Cast ==
- Joseph Ashton as Little Tree
- James Cromwell as Granpa
- Tantoo Cardinal as Granma
- Graham Greene as Willow John
- Mika Boorem as Little Girl
- Christopher Heyerdahl as Pine Billy
- Chris Fennell as Willburn
- Leni Parker as Martha
- Rebecca Dewey as Dolly
- Bill Rowat as Henry
- Robert Daviau as Ralph
- Norris Domingue as Mr. Jenkins

== Production ==
The screenplay for the film was adapted from the 1976 fictional memoir of the same title by Asa Earl Carter (published under the pseudonym Forrest Carter) about an orphaned boy raised by his paternal Scottish-descent grandfather and Cherokee grandmother in the Great Smoky Mountains. In 1991, nearly two decades after its publication, it was revealed that Carter had in fact been a segregationist, anti-Semite, and member of the Ku Klux Klan, which marred critical discussion of the book. Carter's true identity was also questioned after the book's publication in 1976, but he did not address inquiries regarding it, and died three years later in 1979. The screenplay was written by Louise Green, a local television host who first met Carter in September 1975. According to Green, Carter felt that she had a "real feeling" for the book's spiritual elements. Green had written scripts for five medical documentaries but had no experience making scripts for feature films. When Carter asked her to write a screenplay for the book in late 1978, she initially expressed reluctance to the idea but relented after he offered to pay her $25,000. She showed the screenplay to Carter in April 1979. He skimmed through it, expressed his approval, and put it in his suitcase, without bringing up his promised payment.

Writer-director Richard Friedenberg adapted the screenplay shortly after completing his Norman Maclean adaptation of A River Runs Through It (1995). Commenting on the controversial nature of Carter as an individual, Friedenberg stated: "Here was this guy, who did bad things, disappeared off the face of the earth in Alabama, where he was a Ku Kluxer, and reappeared in the Oklahoma-Texas area near the Cherokee reservation of the western Cherokee nation, where he proceeded to write several books. It strikes me he spent his literary life, and whoever he was in his second phase, in some kind of grand apology for his first life." Friedenberg was originally drawn to the book and chose to adapt it as he felt that "characters and milieu they were in represented everything that was good about America and everything that was bad." Prior to Friedenberg's involvement, filmmakers Steven Spielberg and his former producing partnership between Peter Guber and Jon Peters had considered adapting the work into a feature film.

Joseph Ashton, who stars in the film as the titular Little Tree, is himself of Cherokee ancestry.

== Reception ==
=== Box office ===
The Education of Little Tree had a limited release from Paramount Pictures, opening in 52 theaters in the United States on Christmas Day 1997. Paramount's own record-breaking box office hit Titanic opened only days before. The film had a domestic gross of $323,411.

=== Critical response ===
Kevin Thomas of the Los Angeles Times praised the film's visual elements and cinematography, but felt its political correctness was "heavy-handed," noting that "writer-director Richard Friedenberg... lays on the political correctness with a fatally heavy hand. Of course, America's treatment of its native people has been a genocidal disgrace, but every white person in the picture is a buffoon or a racist or both, aside from the grandfather, who has embraced Cherokee culture and renounced his own, and a dirt-poor little girl (Mika Boorem, very winning) whom Little Tree befriends." The Chicago Tribune's Mark Caro wrote that the film "plays out with a certain sweetness... But the plot eventually takes a predictable, Dickensian turn, as Little Tree is removed from his grandparents and placed in a school for Indians." Additionally, Caro felt the film was too didactic, noting: "The mistreatment of Native Americans by whites is a valid topic for a kids movie, but the treatment here is so heavy-handed that it begins to feel like a lecture." Writing for Film Journal International, David Noh also praised Anastas Michos' cinematography, which he wrote "thrillingly records the unearthly, sun-dappled beauty of the mountains... The school scenes are appropriately Oliver Twist. But, for all of the importance placed on Little Tree's roots, the film spends far too much time around the moonshine still and hypocritical local church at the cost of other, more interesting lessons."

Roger Ebert of the Chicago Sun-Times awarded the film three out of four stars, praised the performances as "quietly well-acted," and deemed it a "fine family movie that will no doubt be ignored by the fine families of America... Such movies as Little Tree are the kind that families can discuss afterward. There are truths to be found in them. And questions."

On the internet review aggregator Rotten Tomatoes, the film holds a 63% approval rating, based on 16 reviews, with a weighted average of 6.1 out of 10.

=== Accolades ===
Award or institution	Year	Category	Recipient(s)	Outcome	Ref.
FAITA Award	1997	Outstanding Performance by an Actress in a Film (Lead)	Tantoo Cardinal	Won	
FAITA Award	1997	Outstanding Performance by an Actor in a Supporting Role (Film)	Graham Greene	Won	
Humanitas Prize	1997	Best Feature Film	Richard Friedenberg	Nominated	
Young Artist Award	1997	Jackie Coogan Award	The Education of Little Tree	Won	
Young Artist Award	1997	Best Performance in a Feature Film - Young Actor Age Ten or Under	Joseph Ashton	Won	
Young Artist Award	1997	Best Performance in a Feature Film (Actress Ten or Under)	Mika Boorem	Nominated	
