= Judge Edward Aaron =

African-American handyman (1923–1991)

- Born: January 24, 1923; Birmingham, Alabama, U.S.
- Died: March 11, 1991 (aged 68); Dayton, Ohio, U.S.
- Occupation: Handyman

Judge Edward Aaron (January 24, 1923 – March 11, 1991) was an African American handyman in Birmingham, Alabama, who was abducted by seven members of Asa Earl Carter's independent Ku Klux Klan group on Labor Day, September 2, 1957.

== Background ==
Aaron, or Arone, was born in Barbour County, Alabama on January 24, 1923, and grew up in Batesville.

Aaron, who was mildly developmentally disabled, was abducted by Klan members who beat him with an iron bar, carved the letters "KKK" into his chest, castrated him with a razor, and poured turpentine on his wounds. They then put him in the trunk of a car and drove him away from the scene, finally dumping him near a creek. Police found Aaron, near death from blood loss, and took him to Hillman Hospital, where he was treated and survived.

Two of the six Klansmen turned state's evidence and received five-year sentences in exchange for testifying against the other four men. Those four were convicted and received 20-year sentences at Kilby Prison. However, when George Wallace became the governor of Alabama in 1963, he pardoned the four convicted men, but not the two who had turned state's evidence, with no explanation.

Alabama author, William Bradford Huie, broke the story of this atrocity in the October 1964 issue of "True" magazine in an article titled "Ritual Cutting by the Ku Klux Klan" pp. 22-24, 28, 32, 36. Huie donated the $3000 "True" paid him for the story to Aaron to help pay his medical expenses. Huie also published the story in his 1964 bestseller, "Three Lives for Mississippi" pp. 18-36. In a 1979 interview by Blackside, Inc. for "Eye on the Prize" (available free online), Huie described his investigation of the story and contact with Edward Aaron.

The 1988 film Mississippi Burning references the story of Judge Aaron, but gives his name as Homer Wilkes. He was interviewed about the abduction and attack in 1965.

Aaron died on March 11, 1991, in Dayton, Ohio, aged 68.

== See also ==
- List of kidnappings (1950–1959)
