= The Reconstruction of Asa Carter =

2011 American documentary film

- Directed by: Marco Ricci
- Produced by: Douglas Newman
- Cinematography: Peter Olsen
- Edited by: David Massachi; Marco Ricci
- Music by: Pete Anderson
- Production companies: G. T. T. Gone to Texas; ITVS
- Release date: 2011
- Running time: 57 minutes
- Country: United States
- Language: English

The Reconstruction of Asa Carter is a 2011 American documentary film directed by Marco Ricci.

== Summary ==
It is about Asa Earl Carter (1925–1979), who was a segregationist activist in the Southern United States in the 1950s and 1960s, before he had mainstream success in the 1970s as the supposed Cherokee novelist Forrest Carter, which created a scandal when his real identity was revealed.

== Production ==
The film consists of archive footage and interviews with Carter's friends and associates, who were often unaware of his multiple careers and personas. It was produced by G. T. T. Gone to Texas and ITVS. The runtime is 57 minutes.

== Reception ==
Cynthia Fuchs of PopMatters wrote that the film does not pretend to reveal the true Carter, but treats his elusiveness and contradictory sides as traits in themselves. In The Journal of American History, James I. Deutsch called the documentary fascinating and wrote that it is based on solid research, successfully showing Carter's different faces.
