= Asa Earl Carter =

American segregationist (1925–1979)

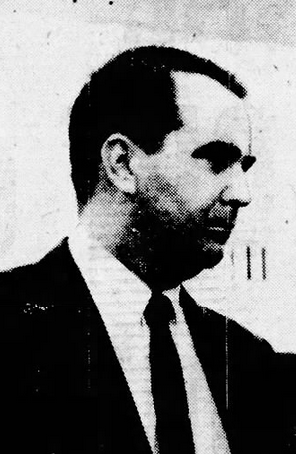
- Carter in 1957
- Born: September 4, 1925; Anniston, Alabama, U.S.
- Died: June 7, 1979 (aged 53); Abilene, Texas, U.S.
- Other name: Forrest Carter
- Occupation: Writer

Asa Earl Carter (September 4, 1925 – June 7, 1979) was an American segregationist and Ku Klux Klan organizer who was prominent in the 1950s for his activism and later as a Western fiction novelist. He was particularly known for his work as a co-writer of George Wallace's well-known pro-segregation line of 1963, "Segregation now, segregation tomorrow, segregation forever." He ran in the Democratic primary for governor of Alabama as a white supremacist. Later, under the pseudonym of supposedly Cherokee writer Forrest Carter, he wrote The Rebel Outlaw: Josey Wales (1972), a Western novel that was adapted into a 1976 film featuring Clint Eastwood that was added to the National Film Registry, and The Education of Little Tree (1976), a best-selling, award-winning book which was marketed as a memoir but which turned out to be fiction.

In 1976, following the success of The Rebel Outlaw and its film adaptation, The New York Times revealed Forrest Carter was actually Asa Carter. His background became national news again in 1991 after his purported memoir, The Education of Little Tree (1976), was re-issued in paperback, topping the Times paperback best-seller lists (both non-fiction and fiction) and winning the American Booksellers Book of the Year (ABBY) award.

Prior to his literary career as "Forrest", Carter was politically active for years in Alabama as an opponent of the civil rights movement. In the mid-1950s, he had a syndicated segregationist radio show, and worked as a speech writer for segregationist Governor George Wallace of Alabama. He also founded the North Alabama Citizens Council (NACC), an independent offshoot of the White Citizens' Council movement formed by Carter when the White Citizens' Council tried to moderate Carter's antisemitism. He also formed the militant and violent Ku Klux Klan group known as the Original Ku Klux Klan of the Confederacy, and started a monthly publication titled The Southerner which spread white supremacist and anti-communist rhetoric.

== Early life ==
Asa Carter was born in Anniston, Alabama in 1925, the second eldest of four children. Despite later claims (as author "Forrest" Carter) that he was orphaned, he was raised by his parents Hermione and Ralph Carter in nearby Oxford, Alabama. Both parents lived into Carter's adulthood. According to high school classmates interviewed by historian and journalist Dan T. Carter and The Anniston Star reporter Fred Burger during the 1990s and 2000s, he was popular among girls, excelled academically, and was considered a gifted actor. These classmates also stated that he rarely talked about racial matters or politics in general. Carter graduated from Oxford High School in May 1943.

Carter served in the United States Navy during World War II, working as a radio operator on the attack transport Appling. During his time in service, the Office of Naval Intelligence investigated a group of sailors on the ship who were regularly meeting to read and discuss American pro-fascist writers such as Gerald L. K. Smith, Gerald Burton Winrod, Father Charles Coughlin, and William Dudley Pelley. Dan T. Carter argues that this reading group played a key part in Carter's political development. Carter was an active member of the group, and many of his views aligned closely with Smith's. According to Larry Carter, one of Asa Carter's brothers, Carter rarely discussed politics before his time in the Navy, but afterwards, he could speak at length about Smith and other far-right activists and even encouraged Larry to read Mein Kampf.

After serving in the Navy, he studied journalism for a year at the University of Colorado at Boulder on the G.I. Bill. After the war, he married India Thelma Walker. The couple settled in Birmingham, Alabama and had four children. His children were Ralph Walker Carter, Asa Earl Carter, both of Abilene, and Bedford Forrest Carter of Alabama; one daughter, India Lara Morgan of Jacksonville, Alabama.

== Career ==
Carter worked for several area radio stations before ending up at station WILD in Birmingham, where he worked from 1953 to 1955. Carter's broadcasts from WILD, sponsored by the American States Rights Association, were syndicated to more than 20 radio stations before the show was cancelled. Carter was fired following community outrage over his attacks on National Brotherhood Week, which promoted friendship with the Jewish community, and a boycott of WILD. Carter broke with the leadership of the Alabama Citizens' Council movement over the incident. He refused to reduce his antisemitic rhetoric, and the Citizens' Council preferred to focus on preserving racial segregation against African Americans.

Carter started a renegade group called the North Alabama Citizens' Council. In addition to his careers in broadcasting and politics, Carter during these years ran a filling station. By March 1956, he was making national news as a spokesman for segregation. Carter was quoted by United Press International as saying that the NAACP had "infiltrated" Southern white teenagers with "immoral" rock and roll records. Carter called for jukebox owners to purge all records by black performers from jukeboxes.

Carter made the national news again on September 1 and 2 of the same year, after he gave an inflammatory anti-integration speech in Clinton, Tennessee. He addressed Clinton's high school enrollment of 12 black students, and after his speech, an aroused mob of 200 white men stopped black drivers passing through, "ripping out hood ornaments and smashing windows". They were heading for the house of the mayor before being turned back by the local sheriff. Carter appeared in Clinton alongside segregationist John Kasper, who was charged later that same month with sedition and inciting a riot for his activities that day. Later that year, Carter ran for a position on the Birmingham City Commission as the Commissioner For Public Safety against former office holder Eugene "Bull" Connor, who won that election in 1957. As with most elections during this time of poll taxes and segregation, the only competitive campaigning was done for the Democratic Party primary. Connor later became nationally famous for his heavy-handed approach to law enforcement during the civil rights struggles in Birmingham. Carter siphoned away some of the "white lower-status vote" from Connor, but finished a distant last in the primary, an indication that his style was becoming unacceptable to Alabama's "'respectable' segregationists."

In 1957, Carter and his brother James were jailed for fighting against Birmingham police officers. The police were trying to apprehend another of the six in their group, who was wanted for a suspected Ku Klux Klan (KKK) shooting. The two men were both later found guilty of disorderly conduct and interfering with an officer and each fined $25. Also during the mid-1950s, Carter founded a paramilitary KKK splinter group, called the "Original Ku Klux Klan of the Confederacy". Carter started a monthly publication entitled The Southerner, devoted to purportedly scientific theories of white racial superiority, as well as to anti-communist rhetoric.

In April 1956, members of Carter's new KKK group attacked singer Nat King Cole on stage at a Birmingham concert. In September 1957, six members of Carter's Klan group abducted and attacked a black handyman named Judge Edward Aaron. They castrated Aaron, poured turpentine on his wounds, and left him abandoned in the trunk of a car near Springdale, Alabama. Police found Aaron, near death from blood loss. Carter was not with the men who carried out this attack. Four of the six involved were convicted of mayhem and sentenced to 20 years, but in 1963, a parole board, appointed by Carter's then-employer Alabama governor George Wallace, commuted their sentences.

In 1958, Carter quit the Klan group he had founded after shooting two members in a dispute over finances. Birmingham police filed attempted murder charges against Carter, but the charges were subsequently dropped. Carter also ran a campaign for lieutenant governor the same year that saw him finish fifth in a field of five.

During the 1960s, Carter was a speechwriter for Wallace. He was one of two men credited with Wallace's famous slogan "Segregation now, segregation tomorrow, segregation forever", part of Wallace's 1963 inaugural speech. Carter continued to work for Wallace, and after Wallace's wife Lurleen was elected governor of Alabama in 1966, Carter worked for her. Wallace never acknowledged the role Carter played in his political career:

Till the day he died, George Wallace denied that he ever knew Asa Carter. He may have been telling the truth. 'Ace', as he was called by the staff, was paid off indirectly by Wallace cronies, and the only record that he ever wrote for Wallace was the word of former Wallace campaign officials such as finance manager Seymore Trammell.

When Wallace decided to enter national politics with a 1968 presidential run, he did not invite Carter on board for the campaign, as he sought to tone down his reputation as a segregationist firebrand. During the late 1960s, Carter grew disillusioned by what he saw as Wallace's liberal turn on race.

Carter ran against Wallace for governor of Alabama in 1970 on a white supremacist platform. Carter finished a distant fourth in the Democratic primary, winning only 1.51% of the vote; Wallace narrowly won the primary in a runoff over the more moderate incumbent governor Albert Brewer. At Wallace's 1971 inauguration, Carter and some of his supporters demonstrated against him, carrying signs reading "Wallace is a bigot" and "Free our white children". The demonstration was the last notable public appearance by "Asa Carter".

== Literary career and death ==
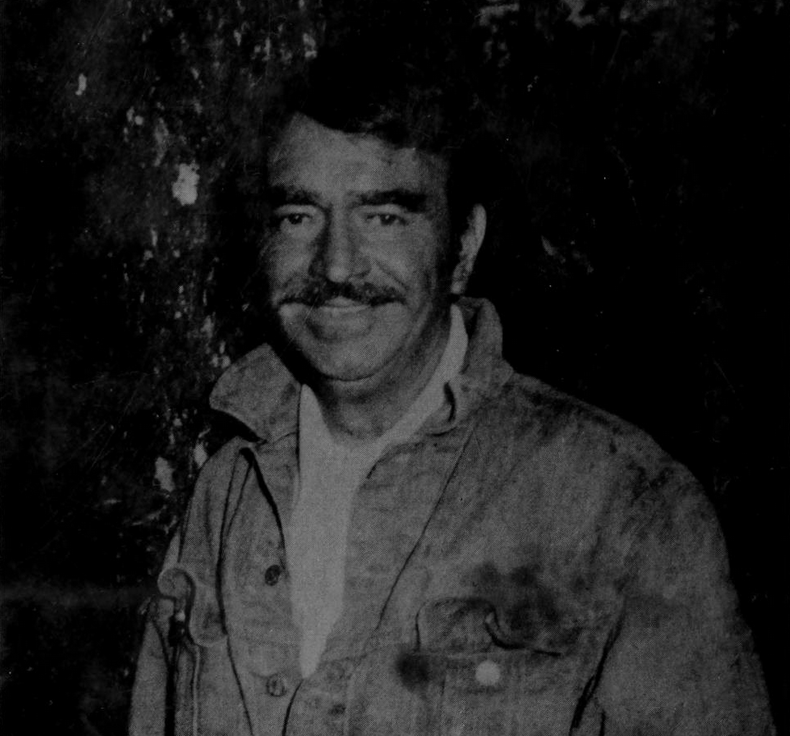
Carter as "Forrest Carter"

After losing the election, Carter moved to Abilene, Texas, where he started over. He began work on his first novel, spending days researching in a public library in Sweetwater, Texas. He distanced himself from his past, began to call his sons "nephews" and renamed himself Forrest Carter, after Nathan Bedford Forrest, a general of the Confederate army who fought in the Civil War, and the first leader of the Ku Klux Klan.

Carter moved to St. George's Island, Florida in the 1970s where he completed a sequel to his first novel, as well as two books on American Indian themes. Carter separated from his wife, who remained in Florida. In the late 1970s, he again settled in Abilene, Texas.

Carter's best-known fictional works are The Rebel Outlaw: Josey Wales (1972, republished in 1975 as Gone to Texas) and The Education of Little Tree (1976), the latter book originally published as a memoir. Although Little Tree sold modestly during Carter's life, it became a sleeper hit after his death.

Clint Eastwood directed and starred in a film adaptation of Josey Wales, retitled The Outlaw Josey Wales (1976) after Carter sent the book to his offices as an unsolicited submission, and Eastwood's partner read and put his support behind it. At this time, neither man knew of Carter's past as a Klansman and rabid segregationist. In 1997, after the success of the paperback edition of The Education of Little Tree, a film adaptation was produced. Originally intended as a TV movie, it was given a theatrical release.

Carter's sequel to The Rebel Outlaw: Josey Wales, titled The Vengeance Trail of Josey Wales (1976), was planned by Clint Eastwood as a film project, but the project was cancelled. The author's Watch for Me on the Mountain (1978) is a fictionalized biography of Geronimo. It was reprinted in 1980 in an edition titled Cry Geronimo!

Carter was working on The Wanderings of Little Tree, a sequel to The Education of Little Tree, as well as a screenplay version of the book, when he died in Abilene on June 7, 1979. The cause of death was reported to have been heart failure. However, the ambulance driver told one of Carter's friends that he had a drunken fight with his son, fell, and choked on his own vomit. Carter's body was returned to Alabama for burial near Anniston, Alabama. He was buried under the name "Forrest Carter"; many years later, the name on the grave was changed to "Asa Earl Carter". After his wife India died on November 22, 2014, she was buried alongside him.

== Controversy and criticism ==
Carter spent the last part of his life trying to conceal his background as a Klansman and segregationist, claiming categorically in a 1976 New York Times article that he, Forrest, was not Asa Carter. The article describes a 1974 interview of Carter by Barbara Walters on the Today show, where Carter was under the name "Forrest" while promoting The Rebel Outlaw: Josey Wales. The Times reported that Carter, who had run for governor of Alabama (as Asa Carter) just four years earlier, was identified by several Alabama politicians, reporters, and law enforcement officials who watched the Today show segment as being the same person as Asa Carter. The Times also reported that the address Carter used in the copyright application for The Rebel Outlaw was identical to the one that he used in 1970 while running for governor. "Beyond denying that he is Asa Carter," the article noted, "the author has declined to be interviewed on the subject."

In 1985, Carter's autobiography was purchased for a paperback edition and marketed by the University of New Mexico Press as a memoir. It was subtitled "A True Story by Forrest Carter". The story described the relationship between the boy and his Scottish-Cherokee grandfather, a man named Wales (an overlap with Carter's other fiction). Written from the perspective of a boy orphaned at age five, the book described how he had become accustomed to life in a remote mountain hollow with his "Indian thinking" "Granpa" and Cherokee "Granma", who called him "Little Tree". Granpa runs a small whiskey operation during Prohibition and the later years of the Great Depression. The grandparents and visitors to the hollow expose Little Tree to (supposed) Cherokee ways and "mountain people" values. The state removes him to an orphanage, where he stays for a few months until an old Indian friend intimidates the director into allowing Little Tree's release. (In life, Carter was neither orphaned nor raised by Cherokee grandparents.)

Before taking a new name and identity, Carter had claimed to have distant maternal Cherokee ancestry, a claim corroborated by some of his family members. Delacorte Press's original author biography referred to Carter as the Cherokee "Storyteller in Council". Members of the Cherokee nation have disputed his claim; they said so-called "Cherokee" words and customs in The Education of Little Tree are inaccurate, and the novel's characters are stereotyped. Several scholars and critics agreed with this assessment, adding that Carter's treatment of Native Americans repeated the romanticized notion of the "Noble Savage".

In 1985, the University of New Mexico Press bought rights to The Education of Little Tree from original publisher Delacorte Press and published it in paperback. By its second year, the new paperback edition began to sell briskly through word-of-mouth publicity, with sales eventually surpassing 600,000. Though Carter's background as Asa Carter was discussed in academic circles, it was not widely known by the book-buying public nearly ten years after the 1976 New York Times article about him. In 1991, after the book won the American Booksellers Book of the Year (ABBY) award, it ranked number one on The New York Times non-fiction paperback best-seller list for several weeks.

On October 4, 1991, Dan T. Carter, a history professor who speculated that, based on their shared heritage, he may be a distant cousin of Asa Carter (the supposition has since been stated elsewhere as fact), published the article "The Transformation of a Klansman" in The New York Times. This article shed light on Asa Carter's dual identity, and The Times shifted the book onto its fiction list. Scholar Henry Louis Gates Jr. also wrote an article on Carter and Little Tree for The Times that appeared in November 1991.

A film adaptation of Little Tree (1997), revived publicity about Asa Carter. His widow India Carter refused most interview requests during these years, but confirmed to Publishers Weekly in 1991 that Forrest and Asa were the same person. Eleanor Friede, Little Tree's original editor, defended Carter's background in 1997, telling the Times: "He was not a member of the Ku Klux Klan. I honestly don't see the point of all this nasty gossip dragged out years ago."

Following the 1991 publicity, the University of New Mexico Press changed the cover of Little Tree, removing the "True Story" subtitle and adding a fiction classification label. Little Tree has continued to find readers and a place on reading lists for young adults since 1991. Henry Louis Gates Jr., argued that Little Tree can be appreciated for its message of tolerance and its other qualities despite its creator's former life.

Richard Friedenberg wrote and directed the 1997 film adaptation. He also has defended the book, but not the author:

Mr. Friedenberg said what appealed to him about the book was that "the characters and milieu they were in represented everything that was good about America and everything that was bad." On the one hand, he said, the book dealt with the strength of the family and not necessarily with traditional families. On the other hand, he said, it dealt with ignorance and prejudice. Mr. Friedenberg said he found it perplexing and almost impossible to understand Mr. Carter's motives and literary ambitions. Although Mr. Carter, who wrote four books, failed to address the issue of his bigotry publicly, Mr. Friedenberg said he believed that "his apology was in his literature." For example, he said, the handful of Blacks and Jews in his books are depicted sympathetically. "The bad guys are almost, without fail, rich whites, politicians and phony preachers," Mr. Friedenberg said.

Oprah Winfrey, who endorsed Little Tree in 1994, later removed it from her list of recommended book titles:

"I no longer—even though I had been moved by the story—felt the same about this book," Winfrey said in 1994. "There's a part of me that said, 'Well, OK, if a person has two sides of them and can write this wonderful story and also write the segregation forever speech, maybe that's OK.' But I couldn't—I couldn't live with that.

The book has also been criticized on literary grounds: "I am surprised, of course, that Winfrey would recommend it," said Loriene Roy, president of the American Library Association. "Besides the questions about the author's identity, the book is known for a simplistic plot that used a lot of stereotypical imagery."

== Works by Forrest Carter ==
=== Books ===
- The Rebel Outlaw: Josey Wales (1972; (Whippoorwill Pub., 1973; reprinted by Delacorte in 1975 as Gone to Texas; and by Dell in 1980 as The Outlaw Josey Wales)
- The Vengeance Trail of Josey Wales (1976, Delacorte Press)
- The Education of Little Tree (1976, Delacorte Press)
- Watch for Me on the Mountain (1978, Delacorte Press; 1980, republished by Dell as Cry Geronimo!)
- The Wanderings of Little Tree (Unfinished)

=== Film adaptations ===
- The Outlaw Josey Wales (1976)
- The Return of Josey Wales (1986)
- The Education of Little Tree (1997)

== Media about Carter ==
=== Books about Carter faking his ethnicity ===
- Browder, Laura (2003). Slippery Characters: Ethnic Impersonators and American Identities.
- Huhndorf, Shari M. (2004). Going Native: Indians in the American Cultural Imagination.
- David Treuer (2006). Native American Fiction: A User's Guide.

=== Films about Carter ===
- The documentary The Reconstruction of Asa Carter (2011) examines Carter's past as a KKK leader and the person who wrote George Wallace's "Segregation Now! Segregation Forever!" speech, and his reinvention as a best-selling "Native American" author.

=== Radio programs about Carter ===
- Carter was the subject of a 2014 episode of the NPR program This American Life, titled "180 Degrees".

== See also ==
- Jamake Highwater (born as Jackie Marks), another writer who faked a Cherokee identity
- William Luther Pierce, another white supremacist who wrote novels under a pseudonym
- Pretendian, the phenomenon of false claims of Native American ancestry
