= The Return of Josey Wales =

1986 film

- Directed by: Michael Parks
- Written by: Asa Earl Carter (publishing as Forrest Carter); R.O. Taylot (special scenes)
- Based on: The Vengeance Trail of Josey Wales by Asa Earl Carter
- Produced by: Mickey Grant
- Starring: Michael Parks; Rafael Campos; Everett Sifuentes; Suzie Humphreys; John William Galt; Charles McCoy; Mary Ellen Averett
- Cinematography: Brant A. Hughes
- Edited by: Ivan L. Bigley
- Music by: Rusty Thornhill
- Distributed by: Magnum Entertainment
- Release dates: 1986 (copyright year): January 23, 1987
- Running time: 90 minutes
- Country: United States
- Language: English

The Return of Josey Wales is a 1986 American Western film directed by and starring Michael Parks. It is a sequel to Clint Eastwood's 1976 film The Outlaw Josey Wales and was adapted from The Vengeance Trail of Josey Wales, the second novel featuring the Josey Wales character, written by Asa Earl Carter under the pen name Forrest Carter.

The Eastwood film had been based on the author's 1973 novel The Rebel Outlaw: Josey Wales.

== Synopsis ==
Friends of veteran gunfighter Josey Wales are killed in Mexico by supporters of the executed Mexican Emperor Maximilian. Another friend, Pablo, rides to the ranch where Josey, thought to be dead by the United States government after the events of The Outlaw Josey Wales, lives quietly with his wife Laura Lee, their baby son Jamie, her grandmother Sarah, and Lone Wolf and his wife and son. After learning of his friends' deaths, Wales travels to Mexico to confront corrupt lawman Captain Jesus Escabedo and get another friend, TenSpot, out of jail.

== Cast ==
- Michael Parks as Josey Wales
- Rafael Campos as Chato
- Everett Sifuentes as Capt. Jesus Escabedo
- Suzie Humphreys as Rose
- John Galt as Kelly
- Charles McCoy as Charlie
- Joe Kurtzo as Nacole
- Paco Vela as Paco
- Bob Magruder as Tenspot
- Benita Faulkner as Enloe
- Mary Ellen Averett as Laura Lee Turner Wales
