= Dan T. Carter =

American historian

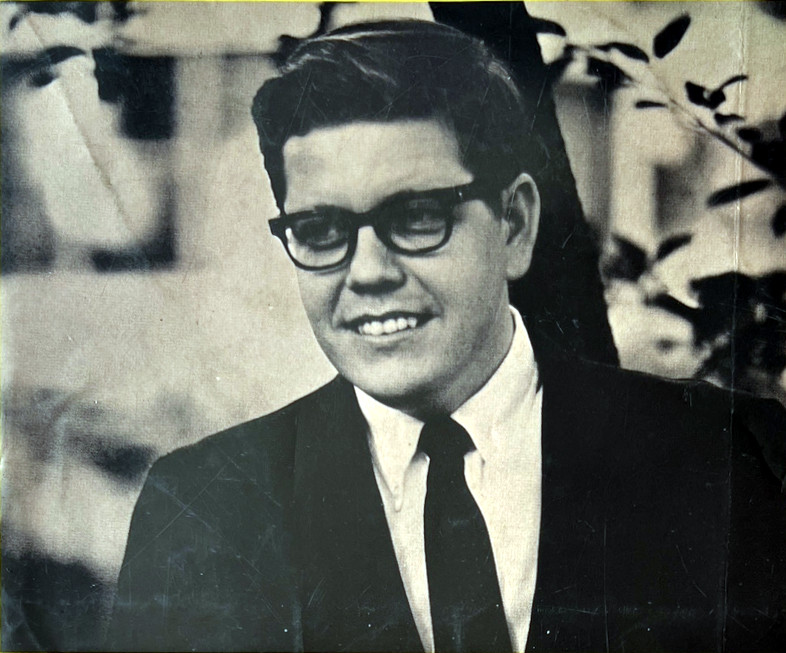
- Carter c. 1969
- Born: United States
- Occupation: Historian

Dan T. Carter is an American historian.

== Life ==
Carter graduated from University of South Carolina, University of Wisconsin, and University of North Carolina at Chapel Hill, with a Ph.D. in 1967. He taught at the University of Maryland, and the University of Wisconsin. He was Kenan University Professor at Emory University, and Educational Foundation Professor at University of South Carolina, retiring in 2007. In 2009, he was the Dow Research Professor at the Roosevelt Center in Middelburg, the Netherlands. He was president of the Southern Historical Association.

In his 1991 article for The New York Times, "The Transformation of a Klansman", regarding the true identity of author Asa Earl Carter (who wrote as Forrest Carter), Carter suggested that their shared Southern heritage might make the two men distant cousins; this suggestion has subsequently been put forward as fact in later publications.

== Awards ==
- 1970 Bancroft Prize
- 1986 Avery O. Craven Award

== Works ==
- "Part 1: What Would Mr. Gingrich Have Said?", The Journal for Multi-Media History, 1999
- Paul Alan Cimbala; Robert F. Himmelberg, eds. (1996). "Reflections of a Reconstructed White Southerner". Historians and race: autobiography and the writing of history. Indiana University Press. p. 33. ISBN 978-0-253-21101-9.
- Carter, Dan T. (October 4, 1991). "The Transformation of a Klansman". The New York Times.
- Scottsboro: a Tragedy of the American South. LSU Press. 1979. ISBN 978-0-8071-0498-9.
- When the War Was Over: the Failure of Self-Reconstruction in the South, 1865-1867. LSU Press. 1985. ISBN 978-0-8071-1204-5.
- The Politics of Rage: George Wallace, the Origins of the New Conservatism, and the Transformation of American Politics. LSU Press. 2000. ISBN 978-0-8071-2597-7.
- From George Wallace to Newt Gingrich: Race in the Conservative Counterrevolution, 1963-1994. LSU Press. 1999. ISBN 978-0-8071-2366-9.
- Unmasking the Klansman: The Double Life of Asa and Forrest Carter. University of Georgia Press. 2023. ISBN 978-1-5883-8548-2.

=== Forewords ===
- Amory D. Mayo (1978). Southern Women in the Recent Educational Movement in the South. Introduction Dan T. Carter, Amy Friedlander. LSU Press. ISBN 978-0-8071-2522-9.
- Eugene N. Zeigler (2008). When conscience and power meet: a memoir. Foreword= Dan T. Carter. University of South Carolina Press. ISBN 978-1-57003-744-3.
