= Michael Parks =

American actor and singer (1940–2017)

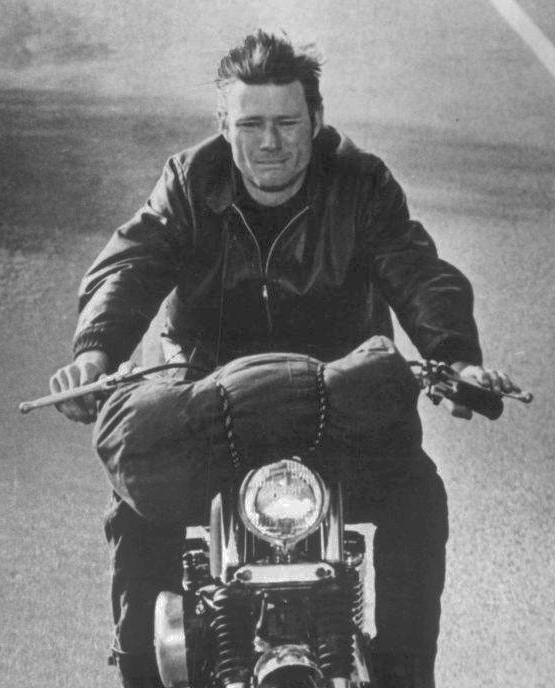
- Parks in Then Came Bronson (1969)
- Born: Harry Samuel Parks; April 24, 1940; Corona, California, U.S.
- Died: May 9, 2017 (aged 77); Los Angeles, California, U.S.
- Occupations: Actor; singer
- Years active: 1960–2017
- Spouses: Louise Johnson (m. 1956; div. 1958) Joanne E. "Jan" Moriarty (m. 1964; died 1964) Carolyn Kay Carson (m. 1969; div. 1977) Frances Alston Fenci Walker (m. 1987; div. 1996) Oriana Parks (m. 1997)
- Children: 2, including James

Michael Parks (born Harry Samuel Parks; April 24, 1940 – May 9, 2017) was an American singer and actor who made numerous film and television appearances, starring in the 1969–1970 series Then Came Bronson. He was widely known for his work in his later years with filmmakers such as Quentin Tarantino, Robert Rodriguez, and Kevin Smith.

== Early life ==
Parks was born in Corona, California to Harry Arthur Parks and Beatrice Adora Dunwoody. He drifted from job to job during his teen years, including picking fruit, digging ditches, driving trucks, and fighting forest fires.

== Career ==
In 1961, Parks portrayed the nephew of the character George MacMichael on the ABC sitcom The Real McCoys. In a Wagon Train episode airing April 10, 1963, Parks played Hamish Browne, in an episode titled "The Heather and Hamish Story". He appeared as Cal Leonard in the 1963 Perry Mason episode "The Case of Constant Doyle", in which Bette Davis played Constant Doyle. He gained recognition in the role of Adam in John Huston's The Bible: In the Beginning... (1966).

Parks was the star of the series Then Came Bronson from 1969 to 1970, in which he rode an iconic red Harley-Davidson Sportster, as he drifted from town to town. He sang "Wayfarin' Stranger", a duet with pilot episode co-star Bonnie Bedelia, and later the theme song for the show, "Long Lonesome Highway", which became a number-20 Billboard Hot 100 and number-41 Hot Country Songs hit. "Long Lonesome Highway" also peaked at number 84 in Australia.

Parks recorded five albums under MGM Records (the label of the studio that produced the series) that charted including Closing The Gap (1969), Long Lonesome Highway (1970), and Blue.

After disputes with the producers of Bronson, Parks said he was informally blacklisted in Hollywood. Parks admitted he could be "difficult on the set" and also said he objected to producers wanting to make the series more violent. After the cancellation of Bronson, Parks did not work in a major Hollywood production for several years, but he had regular small roles in independent or Canadian features throughout the 1970s, such as Between Friends (1973), although director Donald Shebib had trouble dealing with Parks, describing him as a "terrific actor in a lot of ways, but weird". Later in the same interview, Shebib accused Parks of having been openly and aggressively antisemitic, and suggested that this probably hurt his career in Hollywood.

He played in 12 episodes of ABC's The Colbys, a spin-off from Dynasty, first as Hoyt Parker, and then Phillip Colby during the second season (1986–1987). He appeared as Irish mob boss Tommy O'Shea in Death Wish V: The Face of Death (1994), French-Canadian drug runner Jean Renault in the ABC television series Twin Peaks, Dr. Banyard in Deceiver (1997), Texas Ranger Earl McGraw in From Dusk till Dawn (1996), and Ambrose Bierce in From Dusk Till Dawn 3: The Hangman's Daughter (2000).

Parks played two roles in the Kill Bill film series, reprising the role of Earl McGraw in the first film (2003) and playing pimp Esteban Vihaio in the second film (2004). He again reprised the role of Earl McGraw in both segments of the film Grindhouse (2007), making his fourth appearance as the Texas Ranger. His son, James Parks, played the son of Earl McGraw in Kill Bill, From Dusk Till Dawn 2: Texas Blood Money, Death Proof, and Planet Terror. Parks played a villain in Kevin Smith's horror films Red State (2011) and Tusk (2014).

Smith later announced on his podcast that Parks had recorded an album during Red State's production, after Smith and producer Jon Gordon noticed his singing talent during filming. The album, titled The Red State Sessions, was released on August 15, 2011, as a download from the film's website.

== Personal life ==
Parks married five times. His first marriage in 1956 at age 16 to Louise Johnson lasted until 1958 and produced a daughter. His second marriage in 1964 to actress Jan Moriarty lasted only a few months, ending with her apparent suicide from an overdose. His third marriage in 1968 to Carolyn Kay Carson produced a son, actor James Parks. His fourth marriage to Alston Fenci, whom he married in 1987, ended in divorce in 1996. In 1997, he married Oriana. The union lasted until his death.

== Death and reaction ==
Parks died on May 9, 2017 at the age of 77.

Upon hearing the news, director Kevin Smith posted on his Instagram account, "Michael was, and will likely forever remain, the best actor I've ever known. I wrote both Red State and Tusk for Parks, I loved his acting so much." He also included, "He was, hands-down, the most incredible thespian I ever had the pleasure to watch perform. And Parks brought out the absolute best in me every time he got near my set." In a Twitter post, director Robert Rodriguez referred to Michael Parks as "a true legend".

== Documentary ==
Kevin Smith produced a documentary on the life and times of Michael Parks, directed by Michael's former assistant, Josh Roush. Titled Long Lonesome Highway, it covers his beginnings as an itinerant teenager hopping boxcars through being blacklisted in Hollywood, to his career resurgence at the hands of filmmakers such as Quentin Tarantino. It features interviews with James Parks, Kurt Russell, Haley Joel Osment, Robert Rodriguez, Leonard Maltin, Mickey Rourke, Justin Long, Wyatt Russell, Mark Frost, and others.

== Filmography ==
=== Film ===
| Year | Title | Role | Notes |
|---|---|---|---|
| 1965 | Wild Seed | Fargo | |
| 1965 | Bus Riley's Back in Town | Bus Riley | |
| 1966 | The Bible: In the Beginning... | Adam | |
| 1966 | The Idol | Marco | |
| 1967 | The Happening | 'Sureshot' | |
| 1967 | Stranger on the Run | Vincent McKay | |
| 1973 | Between Friends | Tony | |
| 1976 | The Last Hard Men | Sheriff Noel Nye | |
| 1976 | The Savage Bees | Dr. Jeff DuRand | |
| 1977 | Murder at the World Series | Larry Marshall | |
| 1977 | Escape from Bogen County | Jack Kern | |
| 1977 | Sidewinder 1 | J.W. Wyatt | |
| 1977 | The Private Files of J. Edgar Hoover | Robert F. Kennedy | |
| 1978 | Love and the Midnight Auto Supply | 'Duke' | |
| 1978 | Rainbow | Roger Edens | |
| 1979 | The Evictors | Ben Watkins | |
| 1979 | Breakthrough | Sergeant Anderson | |
| 1980 | North Sea Hijack | Harold Shulman | |
| 1981 | Hard Country | Royce | |
| 1982 | Savannah Smiles | Lieutenant Savage | |
| 1986 | The Return of Josey Wales | Josey Wales | Also director |
| 1986 | Spiker | Coach Doames | |
| 1988 | Arizona Heat | Larry Kapinski | |
| 1988 | Nightmare Beach | 'Doc' Willet | |
| 1989 | Caged Fury | Mr. Collins | Also associate producer |
| 1989 | Prime Suspect | Bill Nevins | |
| 1991 | The Hitman | Detective Ronny 'Del' Delany | |
| 1992 | Storyville | Detective Michael Trevllian | |
| 1993 | Over the Line | Pearlmutter | |
| 1994 | Death Wish V: The Face of Death | Tommy O'Shea | |
| 1994 | Stranger by Night | Detective Larson | Direct-to-video |
| 1995 | Sorceress | Stan | Direct-to-video |
| 1996 | From Dusk till Dawn | Texas Ranger Earl McGraw | |
| 1997 | Niagara, Niagara | Walter | |
| 1997 | Deceiver | Dr. Banyard | |
| 1997 | Julian Po | Vern | |
| 1998 | Wicked | Detective Boland | |
| 1999 | From Dusk Till Dawn 3: The Hangman's Daughter | Ambrose Bierce | Direct-to-video |
| 2000 | Bullfighter | Cordobes | |
| 2001 | Big Bad Love | Mr. Aaron | |
| 2002 | 13 Moons | Bartender | |
| 2003 | Kill Bill: Volume 1 | Texas Ranger Earl McGraw | |
| 2003 | The Librarians | William Clark | |
| 2004 | Kill Bill: Volume 2 | Esteban Vihaio | |
| 2005 | Miracle at Sage Creek | Justice Stanley | |
| 2006 | The Listening | James Wagley | |
| 2007 | Grindhouse | Texas Ranger Earl McGraw | Segments: Planet Terror / Death Proof |
| 2007 | El Muerto | Sheriff Stone | |
| 2007 | The Assassination of Jesse James by the Coward Robert Ford | Henry Craig | |
| 2008 | Noble Things | Pete Collins | |
| 2008 | Maidenhead | Dad | |
| 2008 | Three Priests | Jacob | |
| 2010 | Smokin' Aces 2: Assassins' Ball | Fritz Tremor | Direct-to-DVD |
| 2010 | Street Poet | Benny | |
| 2011 | Red State | Pastor Abin Cooper | |
| 2012 | Argo | Jack Kirby | |
| 2012 | Django Unchained | LeQuint Dickey Mining Company Employee | |
| 2013 | We Are What We Are | 'Doc' Barrow | |
| 2014 | Tusk | Howard Howe | |
| 2016 | Blood Father | Tom 'Preacher' Parker | |
| 2016 | Greater | Leo | |
| 2020 | The Queen of Hollywood Blvd. | Chet Fuller | Posthumous release |

=== Television ===
| Year | Title | Role | Notes |
|---|---|---|---|
| 1960–1961 | Dick Powell's Zane Grey Theatre | Juanito / Younger Prisoner | Episode: "Ransom", "The Scar" |
| 1961 | The Law and Mr. Jones | Mike Enslow | Episode: "One by One" |
| 1961 | The Asphalt Jungle | Ty | Episode: "The Sniper" |
| 1961 | Straightaway | Donald Stafford | Episode: "Pledge a Nightmare" |
| 1961 | The Detectives Starring Robert Taylor | Johnny Blaine / Eddy Washburn / Jimmy | Episodes: "Beyond a Reasonable Doubt", "Personal Enemy", "The Frightened Ones" |
| 1962 | Gunsmoke | Park | Episode: "The Boys" |
| 1962 | Target: The Corruptors! | 'Rocky' Kustak | Episode: "Nobody Gets Hurt" |
| 1962 | Stoney Burke | 'Tack' Reynolds | Episode: "The Mob Riders" |
| 1962 | The Real McCoys | Tom | Episode: "George's Nephew" |
| 1962 | Bus Stop | Unknown | Episode: "The Opposite Virtues" |
| 1962 | Sam Benedict | Larry Wilcox | Episode: "Too Many Strangers" |
| 1962 | The Gallant Men | Billy Ray Medford | Episode: "A Place to Die" |
| 1963 | The Alfred Hitchcock Hour | Dr. Daniel Dana | Season 1 Episode 22: "Diagnosis: Danger" |
| 1963 | The Alfred Hitchcock Hour | Skip Baxter | Season 2 Episode 8: "The Cadaver" |
| 1963 | The Greatest Show on Earth | Cristos | Episode: "The Hanging Man" |
| 1963 | Perry Mason | Cal Leonard | Episode: "The Case of Constant Doyle" |
| 1963 | Arrest and Trial | Gregory Wade | Episode: "We May Be Better Strangers" |
| 1963 | 77 Sunset Strip | Eddie Marco | Episode: "Crash Out!" |
| 1963–1964 | Channing | Dante Donati | 2 episodes |
| 1963–1964 | Wagon Train | Hamish Browne / Michael Malone | Episodes: "The Heather and Hamish Story", "The Michael Malone Story" |
| 1964 | Route 66 | 'Tank' | Episode: "Cries of Persons Close to One" |
| 1965 | Bob Hope Presents the Chrysler Theatre | Lieutenant Colonel Burt Engle | Episode: "A Time for Killing" |
| 1969–1970 | Then Came Bronson | Jim Bronson | Lead role, 26 episodes; a feature-length pilot was released theatrically in some European countries |
| 1969 | The Young Lawyers | Ron Baron | Pilot episode |
| 1970 | The Johnny Cash Show | Himself | Singing |
| 1973 | Owen Marshall: Counselor at Law | Ollie Gregson | Episode: "Sometimes Tough Is Good" |
| 1973 | Medical Center | Dr. Chris Wells | Episode: "Fatal Memory" |
| 1974 | Ironside | Professor Riley MacDane | Episode: "A Death in Academe" |
| 1974 | Can Ellen Be Saved? | Joseph | ABC Movie of the Week |
| | The Story of Pretty Boy Floyd | Bradley Floyd | ABC Movie of the Week |
| 1975 | The Rookies | Crilen | Episode: "One-Way Street to Nowhere" |
| 1976 | Ellery Queen | Terry Purvis | Episode: "The Adventure of the Wary Witness" |
| 1978 | Hunters Of The Reef | Jim Spanner | Television film |
| 1979 | Fantasy Island | Convict pen pal to paraplegic Toni Tennille | Espisode: "The Comic"; "Golden Hour" |
| 1981 | Dial M for Murder | Max | Television film |
| 1986 | The Equalizer | Logan | Episode: "Nocturne" |
| 1987 | The Colbys | Phillip Colby | 12 episodes |
| 1988 | The Equalizer | Jonathan Grey | Episode: "Target of Choice" |
| 1989 | Murder, She Wrote | Ben Aaron | Episode: "Prediction: Murder" |
| 1989 | War of the Worlds | 'Cash' McCullough | Episode: "My Soul to Keep" |
| 1989 | Billy the Kid | Rynerson | Television film |
| 1990 | The China Lake Murders | Officer Jack Donnelly | Television film |
| 1990–1991 | Twin Peaks | Jean Renault | 5 episodes |
| 1991 | Shades of L.A. | Reverend James Scarborough | 2 episodes |
| 1993 | SeaQuest 2032 | George Le Chein | Episode: "To Be or Not To Be" |
| 1993 | The Untouchables | Dean 'Dion' O'Banion | Pilot episode, billed as guest star |
| 1996 | Hart to Hart | Evan Powell | Episode: "Secrets of the Hart" |
| 1996–1999 | Walker, Texas Ranger | Major Caleb Hooks | 2 episodes |

== Discography ==
Albums

- 1969 – Closing The Gap (MGM)
- 1970 – Long Lonesome Highway (MGM) (#27 CAN)
- 1970 – Blue (MGM)
- 1970 – Lost & Found (Verve)
- 1971 – Best Of Michael Parks (MGM)
- 1981 – You Don't Know Me (First American)
- 1998 – Coolin' Soup (Listen)
- 2011 – The Red State Sessions (SModcast)

Singles

- 1969 – Tie Me To Your Apron Strings Again / Won't You Ride in My Little Red Wagon (MGM K14092) #117 Billboard's Bubbling Under chart
- 1970 – Long Lonesome Highway / Mountain High (MGM K14104) #20 Billboard's Hot 100 chart, #41 Billboard's Country Singles; #11 Canada Top 100, #17 Canada AC
- 1970 – Sally (Was A Gentle Woman) / Spend A Little, Save A Little (Give A Little Away) (MGM K14154)
- 1970 – Big "T" Water / Won't You Ride in My Little Red Wagon (MGM K14363)
- 1970 – I Was Born In Kentucky / Turn Around Little Mama (Verve VK10653)
