= Braddon Mendelson =

American playwright, producer, and director

- Born: August 23, 1961 (age 65); Northridge, California
- Education: California State University, Northridge (BA)
- Occupations: Playwright, director, producer
- Years active: 1997–Present
- Political party: Democratic
- Spouse: Heather Westcott Mendelson (m. 1998)
- Children: 1
- Writing career
- Genres: Comedy, satire, children's literature, sitcom
- Website: www.braddonmendelson.com

Braddon (/ˈbræd-ənˈ/) Mendelson is an American playwright, director, and producer. He is the author of fifteen full-length plays, including Rembrandt Perfected—winner of the 2022 Long Beach Playhouse New Works Festival; Gallows Falls, a ghost story set in Vermont; and Provenance, the story of an 18th century French game table's journeys back through time. His short one-act plays, Old Friends and Juneteenth, have been presented at festivals in New York City and Pelham, NY, respectively. He produced the 1998 cult classic film Boogie Boy, which was directed by Craig Hamann and executive produced by Academy Award winner Roger Avary (both of whom were collaborators on Quentin Tarantino's first film My Best Friend's Birthday).

As a music video producer, Mendelson worked with some of the top R&B and Rap artists of the late 1990s, including Xzibit, Outkast, Bizzy Bone, Mo Thugs and Ice Cube. He frequently collaborated on music videos with his former screenwriting partner Brian Smith. As a consequence of producing Outkast's 1998 music video for their song "Rosa Parks," Mendelson in 2005 was added as a defendant to the Rosa Parks v. LaFace Records lawsuit, but was subsequently dismissed from the case by the presiding judge.

Mendelson co-created the video poetry series, "CineVerses" with poet/composer Jerry Danielsen. In 2010, he wrote and illustrated the children's book "Have You Seen the Tickle Bug?" and is the director and on-camera host for the children's YouTube show, "Read Me a Story with Brad Mendelson." He also publishes the award-winning satirical website TheSkunk.org.

Mendelson is also a progressive political activist, who was elected as a delegate to the California Democratic Party in 2013 and 2015.

== Published works ==
- Mendelson, Braddon (2010). Have You Seen the Tickle Bug?, Cuckoo Concertos, 40 pages. ISBN 978-1-453-66912-9
- Mendelson, Braddon, & Goodbody, J.B. (editor), et al. (2012). Net's Best Satire, Vol 1 [Kindle Edition], News Roast, LLC, 175 pages. ASIN: B007T7PO6W
- Mendelson, Braddon (2021). Rembrandt Perfected, Noisivision Studios, 107 pages. ISBN 9798748650120
- Mendelson, Braddon (2024). Gallows Falls, Next Stage Press.

== Awards and nominations ==
Year	Award	Category	Work	Result	Ref.
2009	Humorfeed Annual Satire News Competition	Best Internet Satire Article		Won	
2022	Players Theatre Short Play Festival	Official Selection	Old Friends	Won	
2022	Long Beach Playhouse New Works Festival	Best New Play	Rembrandt Perfected	Won	
2022	Austin Film Festival, Stageplay Division	Best Stage Play Script	Rembrandt Perfected	Placed	
2023	Vintage Theatre New Play Festival	Best New Play	Gallows Falls	Finalist	
2025	The Main Theatre, Element Award	Playwriting	Provenance	Won	
