= Jonathan Loughran =

American actor

- Born: November 3, 1966 (age 59)
- Occupation: Actor
- Years active: 1989–present
- Spouse: Kat Loughran (m. 2009)
- Children: 3

Jonathan Loughran (born November 3, 1966) is an American character actor, best known for his appearances in most Happy Madison films with Adam Sandler.

== Career ==
He is Sandler's long-time friend and assistant, the two having worked together at least 40 times.

He is also known for appearing in a few Quentin Tarantino films, including Kill Bill: Volume 1 (2003) and its sequel (2004), and Death Proof (2007).

== Filmography ==
- Sexbomb (1989) as Barry
- Bulletproof (1996) as Rookie Cop
- The Waterboy (1998) as Lyle Robideaux
- Big Daddy (1999) as Mike
- Late Last Night (1999) as Nitro
- Little Nicky (2000) as John
- Undeclared (2001) as Himself
- Punch-Drunk Love (2002) as Wrong Number
- The Master of Disguise (2002) as Security Guard
- Eight Crazy Nights (2002) as Cop #1 (voice)
- National Security (2003) as Sarcastic Cop
- Anger Management (2003) as Nate
- Dickie Roberts: Former Child Star (2003) as Himself
- Kill Bill: Volume 1 (2003) as Trucker
- 50 First Dates (2004) as Jennifer
- Kill Bill: Volume 2 (2004) as Trucker
- Kill Bill: The Whole Bloody Affair (2004) as Trucker
- Grandma's Boy (2006) as Josh
- The Benchwarmers (2006) as Brad's Assistant Coach
- The King of Queens (2006-2007) as Bobby
- Death Proof (2007) as Jasper
- I Now Pronounce You Chuck & Larry (2007) as David Nootzie
- Get Smart (2008) as Orange Team Guy
- The House Bunny (2008) as Tall Prostitute
- Bedtime Stories (2008) as Party Guest
- Finding Sandler (2009) as Himself
- Grown Ups (2010) as Robideaux
- MKC: The Monster Killers Club (2010) as Walt P.
- The Great Marcusio (2010) as Gil
- Mobsters (2011) as Jerry Giggles
- Just Go with It (2011) as Pick Up Guy #1
- Bucky Larson: Born to Be a Star (2011) as Bondage Guy
- Jack and Jill (2011) as Monica's Boyfriend
- Grown Ups 2 (2013) as Robideaux
- Blended (2014) as Home Plate Umpire
- Pixels (2015) as White House Gate Guard
- Hotel Transylvania 2 (2015) as Cop (voice, uncredited)
- The Ridiculous 6 (2015) as Rifleman
- The Do-Over (2016) as Grizzly-Looking Biker
- Hell's Kitchen (2016) as Himself
- Sandy Wexler (2017) as Trucker Jon
- Murder Mystery (2019) as Man at Train Station
- The Wrong Missy (2020) as Paul
- Leo (2023) as Animal Handler
- Happy Gilmore 2 (2025) as Crazy Eyed Orderly

== See also ==
- Johnny, a character from the Hotel Transylvania franchise starring Sandler is also named Jonathan Loughran
