= Perla Haney-Jardine =

American actress

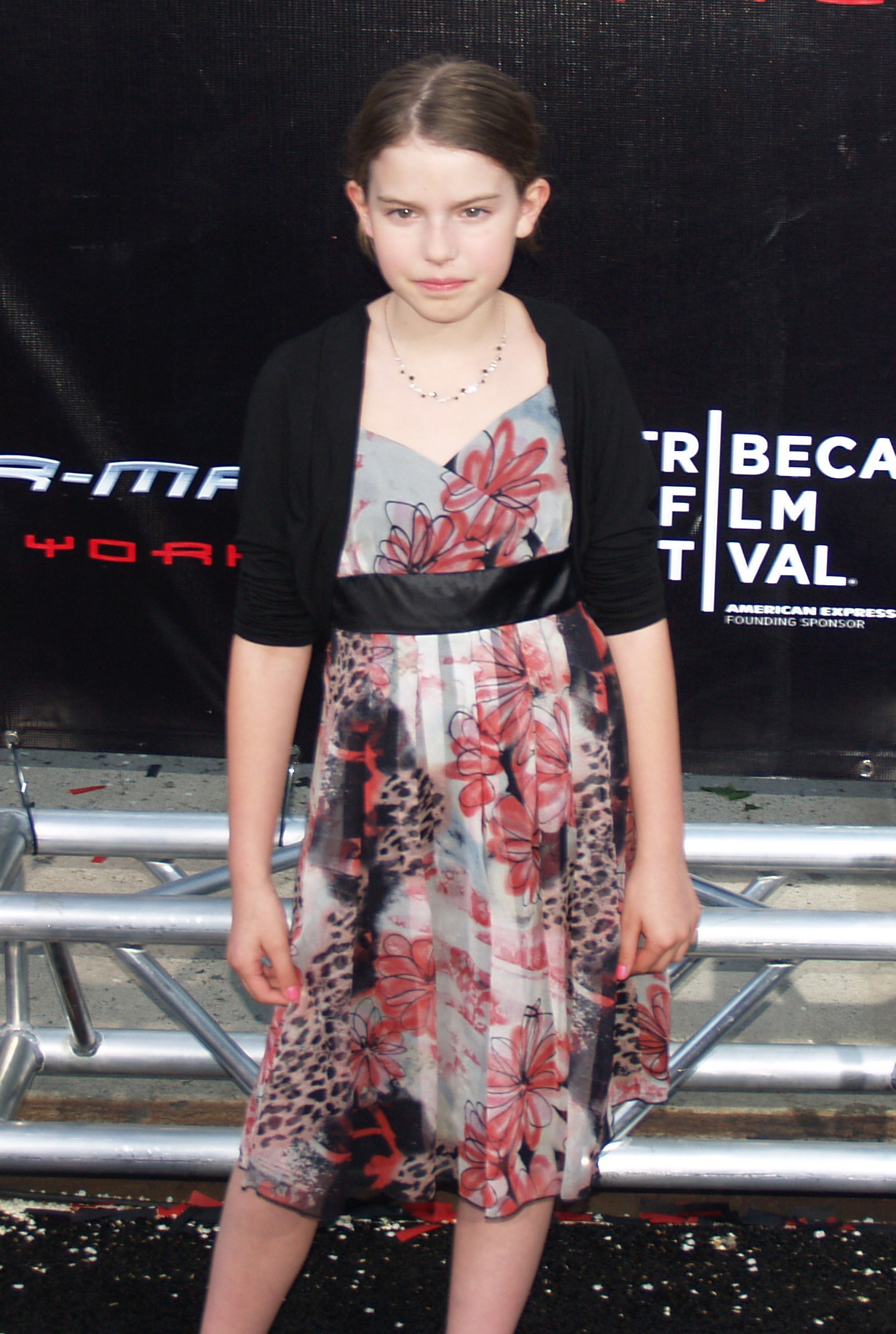
- Haney-Jardine attends the Tribeca Film Festival in 2007
- Born: 2 May 1997 (age 29); Niterói, Rio de Janeiro, Brazil
- Citizenship: Brazil; United States
- Occupation: Actress
- Years active: 2004–present

Perla Haney-Jardine (born 2 May 1997) is a Brazilian-born American actress, best known for her role as B.B. in the 2004 movie Kill Bill: Volume 2.

== Early life ==
Haney-Jardine was born in Niterói, Brazil. Her father, Chusy Haney-Jardine, is a Venezuelan-born director, and her mother, Jennifer MacDonald, is an American film producer.

She started filming commercials before going into movies. Her family lives in Asheville, North Carolina, where she graduated high school from Asheville School.

== Career ==
Haney-Jardine first appeared in Kill Bill: Volume 2 as BB, the daughter of Beatrix Kiddo (Uma Thurman) and Bill (David Carradine). She starred in the 2005 film Dark Water with Jennifer Connelly and Tim Roth, and as Penny Marko, the Sandman's sick daughter, in Spider-Man 3 in 2007. In 2008 she starred as Diane Lane's daughter in the film Untraceable.

== Filmography ==
=== Film ===
Year	Title	Role	Notes
2004	Kill Bill: Volume 2	B.B.	
2004	Kill Bill: The Whole Bloody Affair	B.B.	
2005	Dark Water	Natasha Rimsky / Young Dahlia	
2007	Spider-Man 3	Penny Marko	
2008	Anywhere, U.S.A.	Pearl	
2008	Untraceable	Annie Haskins	
2008	Genova	Mary	
2009	Save the Future	Lauduree	Short film
2012	Future Weather	Lauduree	
2015	Steve Jobs	Lisa Brennan-Jobs	
2017	Midnighters	Hannah	
2019	Once Upon a Time in Hollywood	Hippie drug dealer	

== Awards and nominations ==
Year	Award	Category	Work	Results
2005	Saturn Award	Best Performance by a Younger Actor	Kill Bill: Volume 2	Nominated
