= List of works by Quentin Tarantino =

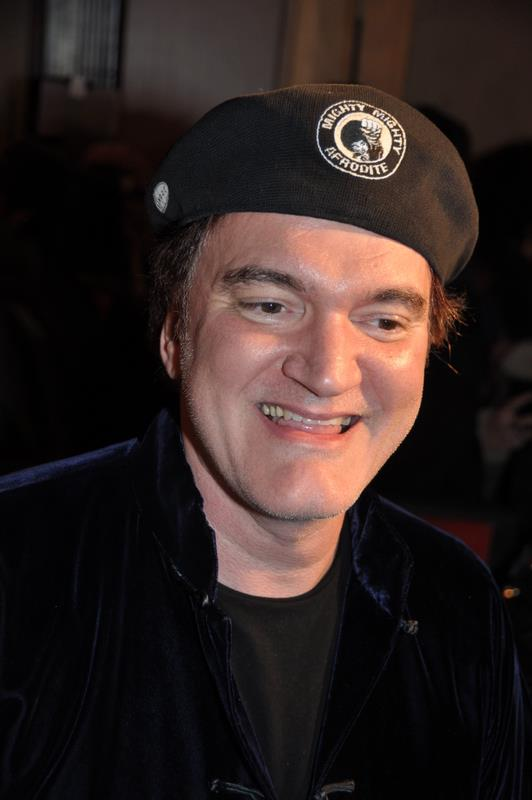
- Tarantino at the French premiere of Django Unchained in 2013
- Film: 16 (10 feature, (Note: Tarantino considers Kill Bill: Volume 1 (2003) and Volume 2 (2004) to be a single film, and so counts his output at nine films, despite there having been ten theatrically released movies.) 6 short)
- Television: 8
- Theatre: 2

Quentin Tarantino is an American director, producer, screenwriter, actor, and author. He has made ten feature films and first began his career in the 1980s by directing and writing Love Birds In Bondage and writing, directing and starring in the black-and-white My Best Friend's Birthday, an amateur short film which was never officially released. He impersonated musician Elvis Presley in a small role in the sitcom The Golden Girls (1988), and briefly appeared in Eddie Presley (1992). As an independent filmmaker, he directed, wrote, and appeared in the violent crime thriller Reservoir Dogs (1992), which tells the story of six strangers brought together for a jewelry heist. Proving to be Tarantino's breakthrough film, it was named the greatest independent film of all time by Empire. Tarantino's screenplay for Tony Scott's True Romance (1993) was nominated for a Saturn Award. Also in 1993, he served as an executive producer for Killing Zoe.

In 1994, Tarantino wrote and directed the neo-noir black comedy Pulp Fiction, a major critical and commercial success. Cited in the media as a defining film of modern Hollywood, the film earned Tarantino an Academy Award for Best Original Screenplay and a Best Director nomination. The following year, Tarantino directed The Man from Hollywood, one of the four segments of the anthology film Four Rooms, and an episode of ER, entitled "Motherhood". He wrote Robert Rodriguez's From Dusk till Dawn (1996)—one of the many collaborations between them—which attained cult status and spawned several sequels, in which they served as executive producers. Tarantino's next directorial ventures Jackie Brown (1997) and Kill Bill (2003–2004) were met with critical acclaim. The latter, a two-part martial arts film (Volume 1 and Volume 2), follows a former assassin seeking revenge on her ex-colleagues who attempted to kill her.

Tarantino's direction of "Grave Danger", a CSI: Crime Scene Investigation episode, garnered him a Primetime Emmy Award for Outstanding Directing for a Drama Series nomination. He directed a scene in Frank Miller and Rodriguez's Sin City (2005). Tarantino and Rodriguez later collaborated in the double feature Grindhouse (2007), Tarantino directed the segment Death Proof. He next penned and directed the war film Inglourious Basterds (2009), a fictionalized account of the Nazi occupation of France during World War II. The critically and commercially successful film earned Tarantino two nominations at the 82nd Academy Awards—Best Director and Best Original Screenplay. His greatest commercial success came with the 2012 Western film Django Unchained, which is about a slave revolt in the Antebellum South. Earning $426.1 million worldwide, it won him another Academy Award for Best Original Screenplay. Tarantino then wrote and directed another commercially successful Western film, The Hateful Eight (2015), whose screenplay was nominated for a BAFTA Award and a Golden Globe Award. In April 2014, he held a staged reading of a leaked early draft of The Hateful Eight at Los Angeles County Museum of Art's theatre at Ace Hotel. He wrote and directed the 2019 drama Once Upon a Time in Hollywood, which follows a fading actor and his stunt double as they navigate 1969 Hollywood. The film was nominated for 10 Academy Awards, including Best Picture. In 2026, he wrote and directed the play The Popinjay Cavalier, which is set to have a preview at the Phoenix Theatre on February 23, 2027, before its official debut on March 18.

== Film ==
Year	Title	Director	Writer	Producer	Notes	Ref.
1992	Reservoir Dogs	Yes	Yes	No		
1994	Pulp Fiction	Yes	Yes	No	Story co-written with Roger Avary	
1997	Jackie Brown	Yes	Yes	No	Adapted from the novel Rum Punch by Elmore Leonard	
2003	Kill Bill: Volume 1	Yes	Yes	No	Premiered as one film, Kill Bill: The Whole Bloody Affair, in 2004	
2004	Kill Bill: Volume 2	Yes	Yes	No	Premiered as one film, Kill Bill: The Whole Bloody Affair, in 2004	
2007	Death Proof	Yes	Yes	Yes	Also cinematographer	
2009	Inglourious Basterds	Yes	Yes	No		
2012	Django Unchained	Yes	Yes	No		
2015	The Hateful Eight	Yes	Yes	No		
2019	Once Upon a Time in Hollywood	Yes	Yes	Yes		

=== Short films ===
Year	Title	Director	Writer	Producer	Other	Notes	Ref.
1986	Love Birds In Bondage	Yes	Yes	Yes	Yes	Unfinished short film Also editor and co-directed with Scott Magill	
1987	My Best Friend's Birthday	Yes	Yes	Yes	Yes	Unfinished feature film Also editor and screenplay co-written with Craig Hamann	
1987	Maximum Potential	No	No	No	Yes	Exercise video production assistant	
1991	Reservoir Dogs: Sundance Institute 1991 June Film Lab	Yes	Yes	No	Yes	Also cinematographer and editor Sundance Institute short film	
1995	The Man from Hollywood	Yes	Yes	Executive	No	Segment from Four Rooms	
2005	The Big Fat Kill	Guest	No	No	No	Segment from Sin City; Directed scene of Dwight McCarthy driving to the tar pits	
2025	The Lost Chapter: Yuki's Revenge	Yes	Yes	No	No	Animated adaptation of cut scene from Kill Bill: The Whole Bloody Affair	

=== Writer or producer only ===
Year	Title	Writer	Producer	Notes	Ref.
1991	Past Midnight	Uncredited	Associate	Rewrite	
1993	True Romance	Yes	No		
1994	It's Pat	Uncredited	No	Rewrite	
1994	Natural Born Killers	Story	No	Screenplay rewritten by Oliver Stone, David Veloz, and Richard Rutowski	
1995	Crimson Tide	Uncredited	No	Rewrite	
1996	From Dusk till Dawn	Yes	Executive	Story written by Robert Kurtzman	
1996	The Rock	Uncredited	No	Rewrite	
2001	Iron Monkey	No	Yes	American release only	
2007	Planet Terror	No	Yes		
2026	The Further Mis-Adventures of Cliff Booth	Yes	No		

=== Executive producer only ===
Year	Title	Notes	Ref.
1993	Killing Zoe		
1996	Curdled		
1998	God Said Ha!		
1999	From Dusk Till Dawn 2: Texas Blood Money	"Presented by" Direct-to-video	
1999	From Dusk Till Dawn 3: The Hangman's Daughter	"Presented by" Direct-to-video	
2002	Hero	"Presented by"	
2004	My Name Is Modesty	"Presented by" Direct-to-video	
2005	The Protector	"Presented by"	
2005	Hostel	"Presented by"	
2005	Daltry Calhoun		
2006	Freedom's Fury	Documentary film	
2007	Hostel: Part II	"Presented by"	
2008	Hell Ride	"Presented by"	
2012	The Man with the Iron Fists	"Presented by"	
2025	One Spoon of Chocolate	"Presented by"	
2026	The Projectionist		

=== Acting roles and documentary appearances ===
Year	Title	Role	Notes	Ref.
1986	Warzone	TBA	Short film	
1986	Love Birds in Bondage	Mickey	Short film	
1987	My Best Friend's Birthday	Clarence Poole	Short film	
1991	Reservoir Dogs: Sundance Institute 1991 June Film Lab	Mr. White	Short film	
1992	Reservoir Dogs	Mr. Brown		
1992	Eddie Presley	Asylum attendant	Cameo	
1994	The Coriolis Effect	Panhandle Slim	Short film, voice cameo	
1994	Pulp Fiction	Jimmie Dimmick		
1994	Somebody to Love	Bartender	Cameo	
1994	Sleep with Me	Sid	Cameo	
1995	Destiny Turns on the Radio	Johnny Destiny		
1995	Desperado	Pick-up guy		
1995	Dance Me to the End of Love	Groom	Music video	
1995	Four Rooms	Chester Rush	Segment: "The Man from Hollywood"	
1996	From Dusk till Dawn	Richie Gecko		
1996	Girl 6	Director #1 – NY	Cameo	
1997	Off the Menu: The Last Days of Chasen's	Himself	Documentary film	
1997	Jackie Brown	Answering Machine	Uncredited voice cameo	
1998	God Said Ha!	Himself		
2000	Little Nicky	Deacon	Cameo	
2002	All the Love You Cannes!	Himself	Documentary film	
2002	BaadAsssss Cinema	Himself	Documentary film	
2003	Kill Bill: Volume 1	Crazy 88 member	Uncredited cameo	
2004	Double Dare	Himself	Documentary film	
2004	Kill Bill: The Whole Bloody Affair	Crazy 88 member	Uncredited cameo	
2004	Z Channel: A Magnificent Obsession	Himself	Documentary film	
2004	The Cutting Edge: The Magic of Movie Editing	Himself	Documentary film	
2005	The Muppets' Wizard of Oz	Himself	Television film, cameo	
2007	Death Proof	Warren the Bartender		
2007	Planet Terror	Rapist #1 / Zombie eating road kill	Cameos	
2007	Sukiyaki Western Django	Piringo		
2007	Diary of the Dead	Newsreader	Voice cameo	
2008	Dead On: The Life and Cinema of George A. Romero	Himself	Documentary film	
2008	Not Quite Hollywood: The Wild, Untold Story of Ozploitation!	Himself	Documentary film	
2009	Inglourious Basterds	First scalped Nazi / American GI	Uncredited cameos	
2011	Corman's World: Exploits of a Hollywood Rebel	Himself	Documentary film	
2011	POM Wonderful Presents: The Greatest Movie Ever Sold	Himself	Documentary film	
2011	Hollywood Don't Surf!	Himself	Documentary film	
2011	Nightmare Factory	Himself	Documentary film	
2011	Method to the Madness of Jerry Lewis	Himself	Documentary film	
2012	Django Unchained	Robert (Bag Head #1) / Frankie	Cameos	
2014	One Day Since Yesterday: Peter Bogdanovich & the Lost American Film	Himself	Documentary film	
2014	She's Funny That Way	Himself	Cameo	
2015	The Hateful Eight	Narrator	Uncredited voice cameo	
2018	Friedkin Uncut	Himself	Documentary film	
2018	What She Said: The Art of Pauline Kael	Himself	Documentary film	
2018	The Great Buster: A Celebration	Himself	Documentary film	
2019	Once Upon a Time in Hollywood	Red Apple Cigarettes commercial director	Uncredited voice cameo	
2019	QT8: The First Eight	Himself (archival footage)	Documentary film	
2020	Jay Sebring....Cutting to the Truth	Himself	Documentary film	
2021	Django & Django	Himself	Documentary film	
2021	Ennio	Himself	Documentary film	
2022	Sergio Leone: The Italian Who Invented America	Himself	Documentary film	
2023	Sly	Himself	Documentary film	
2025	The Lost Chapter: Yuki's Revenge	Bill	Short film, voice role	
2026	Only What We Carry	John Percy		
2026	Robert Richardson: The White Devil	Himself	Documentary film	
TBA	Tangled Up in Blue	TBA	Post-production	

== Television ==
Year	Title	Director	Writer	Producer	Notes	Ref.
1995	ER	Yes	No	No	Episode: "Motherhood"	
2004	Jimmy Kimmel Live!	Yes	No	Yes	Episode: "Season 3, Episode 75"	
2005	CSI: Crime Scene Investigation	Yes	Story	No	Episodes: "Grave Danger: Volume 1" and "Grave Danger: Volume 2"; Co-written with Anthony E. Zuiker, Carol Mendelsohn, and Naren Shankar	
2014–2016	From Dusk till Dawn: The Series	No	Based on	No	Based on From Dusk till Dawn, 30 episodes	
2015–2016	#15SecondScare	No	No	Executive	14 episodes	
2019	The Hateful Eight: Extended Version	Yes	Yes	No	4 episodes	

=== Acting roles ===
Year	Title	Role	Notes	Ref.
1988	The Golden Girls	Elvis Presley impersonator	Episode: "Sophia's Wedding: Part 1"	
1995	All-American Girl	Desmond Winocki	Episode: "Pulp Sitcom"	
1995	Saturday Night Live	Himself (host)	Episode: "Quentin Tarantino / The Smashing Pumpkins"; Also performer: "I'll Blow You a Kiss in the Wind"	
2002, 2004	Alias	McKenas Cole	4 episodes	
2005	Duck Dodgers	Master Moloch (voice)	Episode: "Master & Disaster"	
2015–2016	#15SecondScare	Himself (judge)	14 episodes	
2019	The Hateful Eight: Extended Version	Narrator (voice)	4 episodes	
2022	Super Pumped	Narrator (voice)	7 episodes	

== Reception ==
Year	Film	Rotten Tomatoes	Metacritic	Budget	Box office
1992	Reservoir Dogs	90% (81 reviews)	81% (24 reviews)	$1.2 million	$2,942,225
1994	Pulp Fiction	92% (184 reviews)	95% (27 reviews)	$8.5 million	$213,928,762
1997	Jackie Brown	88% (98 reviews)	62% (23 reviews)	$12 million	$39,697,308
2003	Kill Bill: Volume 1	85% (236 reviews)	69% (43 reviews)	$30 million	$180,908,413
2004	Kill Bill: Volume 2	84% (246 reviews)	83% (41 reviews)	$30 million	$154,116,796
2004	Kill Bill: The Whole Bloody Affair	100% (37 reviews)	95% (12 reviews)	$60 million	$13,251,682
2007	Death Proof	67% (45 reviews)	77% (36 reviews)	$30 million	$31,126,421
2009	Inglourious Basterds	89% (333 reviews)	69% (36 reviews)	$70 million	$321,461,171
2012	Django Unchained	87% (296 reviews)	81% (42 reviews)	$100 million	$426,079,005
2015	The Hateful Eight	74% (333 reviews)	68% (51 reviews)	$62 million	$161,217,616
2019	Once Upon a Time in Hollywood	86% (581 reviews)	84% (62 reviews)	$96 million	$409,736,746

== Video games ==
Year	Title	Writer	Actor	Notes	Ref.
1996	Steven Spielberg's Director's Chair	No	Yes	Role: Jack Cavello	
2001	From Dusk Till Dawn	Based on	No	Based on the film of the same name written by Tarantino	
2006	Reservoir Dogs	Based on	No	Based on the film of the same name written and directed by Tarantino	

== Stage ==
Year	Title	Director	Writer	Actor	Place premiered	Notes	Ref.
1998	Wait Until Dark	No	No	Yes	Brooks Atkinson Theatre	Role: Harry Roat Jr.	
2014	The Hateful Eight Live Reading	Yes	Yes	Yes	Theatre at Ace Hotel	Role: Narrator	
2015	True Romance Live Reading	No	Yes	No	Theatre at Ace Hotel		
2027	The Popinjay Cavalier	Yes	Yes	No	Phoenix Theatre		

== Bibliography ==
- Django/Zorro (2014)
- Once Upon a Time in Hollywood: A Novel (2021)
- Cinema Speculation (2022)
- The Adventures of Cliff Booth (2026)

== See also ==
- Quentin Tarantino's unrealized projects
- Tarantinoesque film
