= Reservoir Dogs =

1992 American crime film by Quentin Tarantino

- Theatrical release poster
- Directed by: Quentin Tarantino
- Written by: Quentin Tarantino
- Produced by: Lawrence Bender
- Starring: Harvey Keitel; Tim Roth; Chris Penn; Steve Buscemi; Lawrence Tierney; Michael Madsen
- Cinematography: Andrzej Sekuła
- Edited by: Sally Menke
- Production companies: Live Entertainment; Dog Eat Dog Productions
- Distributed by: Miramax Films (United States); Carolco Pictures (International)
- Release dates: January 21, 1992 (Sundance); October 9, 1992 (United States)
- Running time: 99 minutes
- Country: United States
- Language: English
- Budget: $1.2–3 million
- Box office: $22 million

Reservoir Dogs is a 1992 American heist film written and directed by Quentin Tarantino in his feature-length directorial debut. It stars Harvey Keitel, Tim Roth, Chris Penn, Steve Buscemi, Lawrence Tierney, Michael Madsen, Tarantino, and Edward Bunker as diamond thieves whose heist of a jewelry store goes terribly wrong. Kirk Baltz, Randy Brooks, and Steven Wright also play supporting roles. The film incorporates many motifs that have become Tarantino's hallmarks: violent crime, pop culture references, profanity, and nonlinear storytelling.

The film is regarded as a classic independent film and a cult film. Although controversial at first for its depictions of violence and heavy use of profanity, Reservoir Dogs was generally well received, and the cast was praised by many critics. Despite not being heavily promoted during its theatrical run, the film became a modest success in the United States after grossing $2.9 million against its scant budget. It achieved higher popularity after the success of Tarantino's next film, Pulp Fiction (1994). A soundtrack was released featuring songs used in the film, which are mostly from the 1970s. It was named "Greatest Independent Film of All Time" by the British film magazine Empire, which in 2008 also named it the 97th-greatest film ever made.

== Plot ==
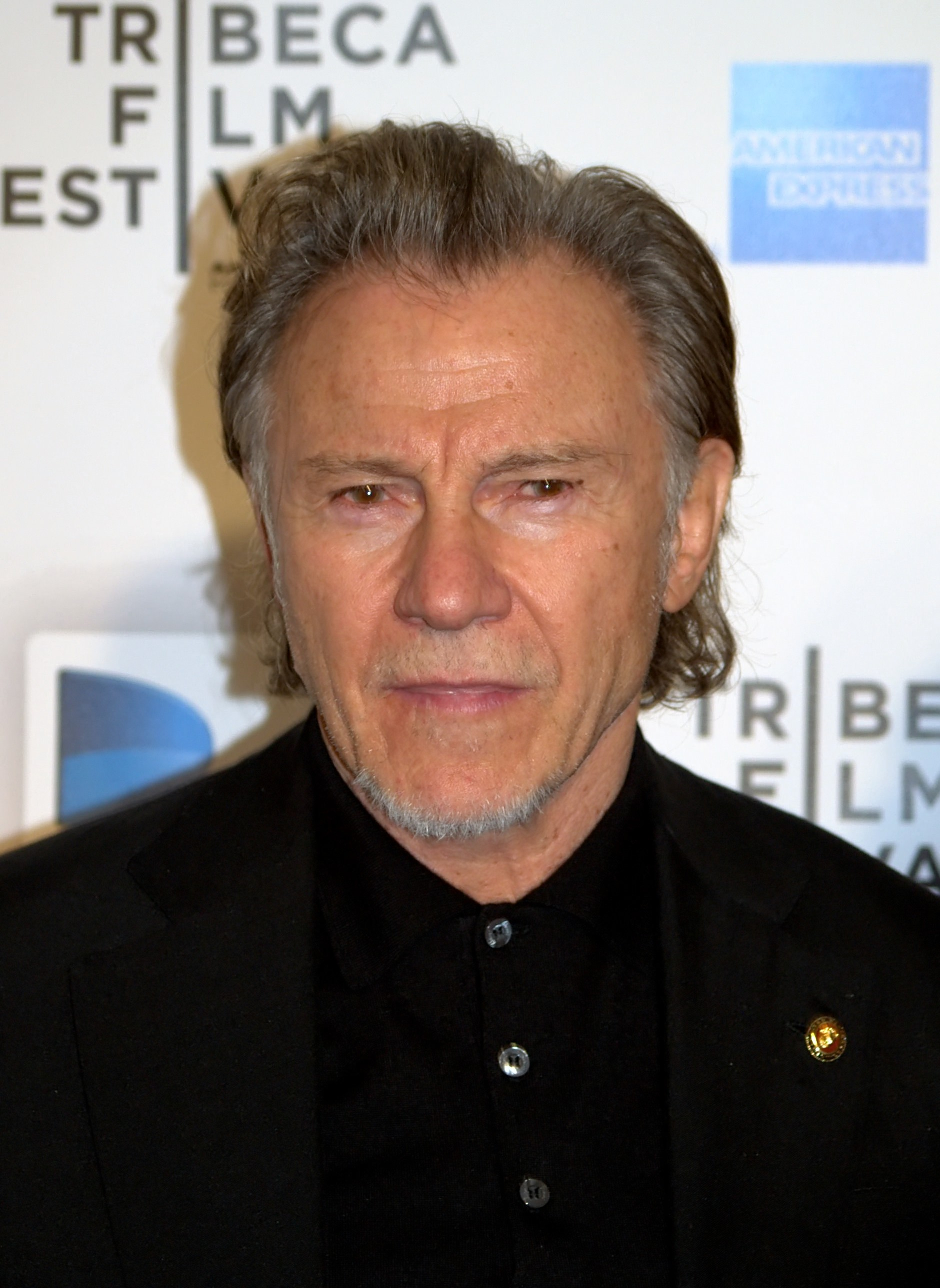
Harvey Keitel plays Mr White

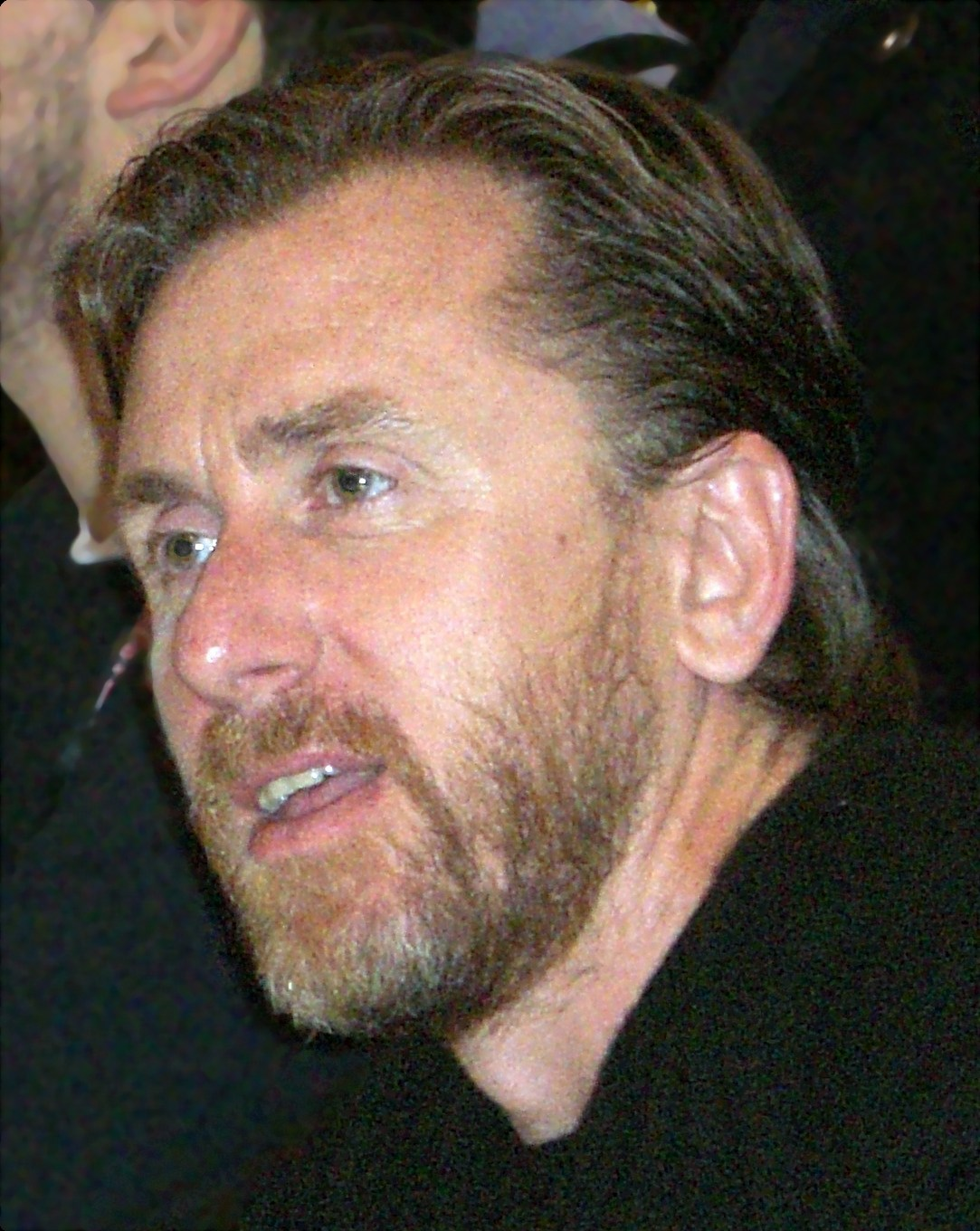
Tim Roth plays Mr Orange

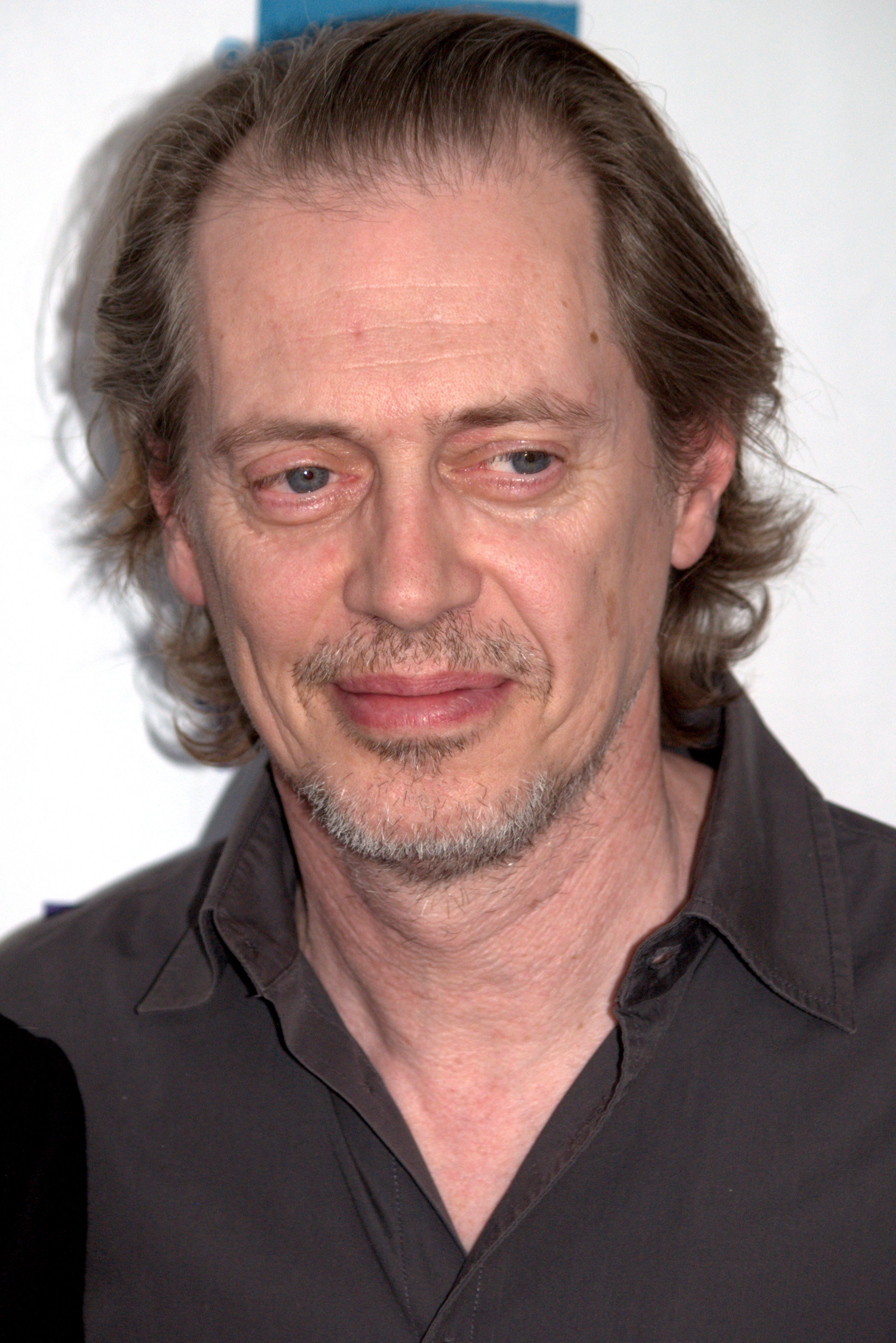
Steve Buscemi plays Mr Pink

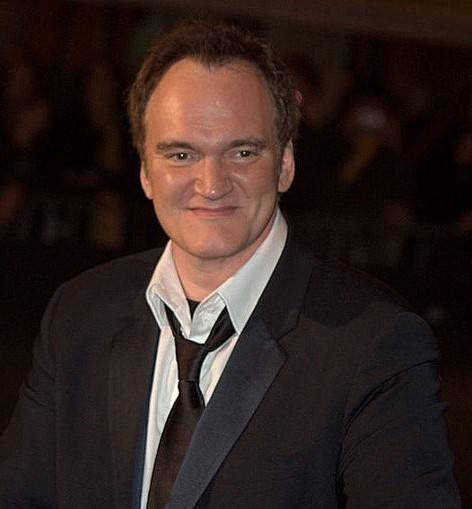
Writer/director Quentin Tarantino plays Mr Brown

Eight men planning to rob a jewelry store for a diamond shipment eat breakfast at a diner. To pull off the heist, boss Joe Cabot assembles six experienced robbers who are strangers to each other. Joe and his son, "Nice Guy" Eddie Cabot, have known some of the team for years, but to shield identities, the rest use aliases: Mr. White, a career criminal; Mr. Blonde, a trigger-happy ex-convict; Mr. Orange, a reputed drug dealer; Mr. Pink, a paranoid neurotic; Mr. Brown, a pseudophilosopher; and Mr. Blue, an even-tempered cohort.

When an alarm is tripped during the heist, the police arrive quickly. Running from police, Pink hijacks a car, killing a couple of police officers in a shootout. White, who shoots police officers pursuing in a prowler, flees with Orange, who is shot hijacking a car before he kills the driver. Shot in the abdomen, Orange bleeds profusely in the back seat of the car driven by White. Despite Orange's pleadings to be taken to a hospital, White insists that he is not fatally wounded. At their warehouse hideout, White and Orange rendezvous with Pink, who informs them that he has hidden the diamonds nearby.

Pink believes that the job was a setup and that the police were waiting to ambush them. White informs Pink that Brown is dead, Blue and Blonde are missing, and Blonde—a loose cannon—murdered several bystanders during the heist. White is furious that Joe, his old friend, would employ Blonde, who he describes as a psychopath. Pink argues with White, who feels responsible for Orange being shot, over whether to get medical attention for Orange, and Pink is wary that Joe is not there to get a doctor. The pair draw guns on each other, but they stand down when Blonde arrives with a kidnapped policeman, Marvin Nash.

In flashback, having been paroled after a four-year prison sentence, Blonde meets with the Cabots. To reward him for not giving Joe's name to the authorities, the Cabots offer Blonde a no-show job. Though grateful, Blonde insists that he wants to get back to "real work", and they recruit him for the heist.

In the present, White and Pink begin to torture Nash for information. Eddie arrives and orders them to go with him to ditch the getaway vehicles, leaving Blonde in charge of prisoner Nash and the in-and-out-of-consciousness Orange. Nash denies prior knowledge of the heist, but Blonde resumes the torture by slashing his face and cutting off his ear with a straight razor while a radio plays "Stuck in the Middle with You". When Blonde prepares to set Nash on fire, Orange shoots and kills him. Disclosing to Nash that he is an undercover police officer, Orange says that the police will arrive when Joe comes to the warehouse. Nash replies that he recognized Orange, revealing that Nash protected Orange's cover under torture. Flashbacks show scenes of Orange gaining Joe's and White's confidence and building rapport with the team.

When Eddie, Pink, and White return, Orange tries to convince them that Blonde planned to kill them all and steal the diamonds for himself. Eddie shoots and kills Nash and accuses Orange of lying, since Blonde proved loyal to his father. Joe arrives with news that the police have killed Blue. Suspecting that Orange is the traitor behind the setup, Joe is about to execute him, but White intervenes, holding Joe at gunpoint and insisting that Orange is not a police officer. Eddie aims his gun at White, creating a Mexican standoff. All three fire. Both Eddie and Joe Cabot are killed, and White and Orange are wounded.

Pink (the only uninjured person), takes the diamonds and flees, but is apprehended by the police outside. As White cradles the dying Orange in his arms, Orange confesses that he is in fact a police officer. White presses his gun to Orange's head. The police storm the warehouse and order White to drop his gun. Gunshots sound and White collapses.

== Cast ==
The film's opening credits sequence, a slow-motion scene featuring the eight criminals, accompanied by "Little Green Bag" by the George Baker Selection

- Harvey Keitel as Larry Dimick "Mr. White"
- Tim Roth as Freddy Newendyke "Mr. Orange"
- Michael Madsen as Vic Vega "Mr. Blonde"
- Chris Penn as "Nice Guy" Eddie Cabot
- Steve Buscemi as "Mr. Pink"
- Lawrence Tierney as Joe Cabot
- Randy Brooks as Detective Jim Holdaway
- Kirk Baltz as Officer Marvin Nash
- Edward Bunker as "Mr. Blue"
- Quentin Tarantino as "Mr. Brown"
- David Steen as Sheriff #2
- Steven Wright as K-Billy DJ (voice)

Rich Turner played Sheriff #1. Nina Siemaszko played police officer Jody McClusky; her scenes were deleted from the theatrical release. There is an unseen accomplice of Joe and Eddie who speaks to Eddie on the phone. His name is Dov Schwarz, named after the sound editor on My Best Friend's Birthday.

== Production ==
Quentin Tarantino had been working at Video Archives, a video store in Manhattan Beach, California, and originally planned to shoot the film with his friends on a budget of $30,000 in a 16 mm black-and-white format, with himself playing Mr. Pink and producer Lawrence Bender playing both Nice Guy Eddie and a police officer chasing Mr. Pink. According to Tarantino, the title Reservoir Dogs came about after a patron at the store mispronounced the title Au revoir les enfants as "reservoir dogs". Bender gave the script to his acting teacher, whose wife gave the script to Harvey Keitel. Keitel liked it enough to sign as a co-producer so Tarantino and Bender would have an easier job finding funding; with his assistance, they raised $1.5 million. Keitel also paid for Tarantino and Bender to host casting sessions in New York, where the duo found Steve Buscemi, Michael Madsen, and Tim Roth. Tim Roth's agents originally wanted him to be Mr. Pink or Mr. Blonde, but he preferred Mr. Orange because he would "be an English actor pretending to be American playing a cop pretending to be a robber". Michael Madsen wanted to play Mr. Pink and auditioned for that part but Tarantino insisted that he play Mr. Blonde. Jon Cryer was asked to audition for the role of Mr. Pink, but he backed out at the last minute. James Woods was also considered for Mr. Pink, but his agent turned it down without telling him. Jeffrey Dean Morgan successfully read for the role of Mr. Brown but Tarantino ultimately decided to play the part himself. Viggo Mortensen, George Clooney, Samuel L. Jackson and David Duchovny also read for roles. In June 1991, Tarantino directed a short film version of Reservoir Dogs as a proof of concept at the Sundance Institute.

The film contains multiple homages to other films. In a 1992 interview, Tarantino says he likes the title of Reservoir Dogs because "it sounds like in a film by Alain Delon by Jean-Pierre Melville... I could see Alain Delon in a black suit say: "I'm Mr. Blonde". Moreover, Le Samouraï is one of Quentin Tarantino's favorite films and influenced him in the creation of the world of Reservoir Dogs and Pulp Fiction. The idea of the costumes of the films came from a discussion between Tarantino and the costume designer Betsy Heimann, about French noir films with Alain Delon. Tarantino has said that Reservoir Dogs was influenced by Stanley Kubrick's 1956 film noir The Killing: "I didn't go out of my way to do a rip-off of The Killing, but I did think of it as my 'Killing', my take on that kind of heist movie." The film's plot was also inspired by the 1952 film Kansas City Confidential. Additionally, Joseph H. Lewis's 1955 film The Big Combo and Sergio Corbucci's 1966 Spaghetti Western Django inspired the scene where a police officer is tortured in a chair. Having the main characters named after colors (Mr. Pink, White, Brown, etc.) was first seen in the 1974 film The Taking of Pelham One Two Three. The film also contains key elements similar to those found in Ringo Lam's 1987 film City on Fire. Tarantino praised the film City on Fire and mentioned it as a major influence. He cited Ulu Grosbard's 1979 film Straight Time as an influence too, explaining that the criminals in Reservoir Dogs were "not wise guys or gangsters. They're like Dustin Hoffman in Straight Time: they do jobs". Straight Time was based on the novel No Beast So Fierce, written by Edward Bunker.

The film's production experienced several significant difficulties. Tarantino said that everybody "hated" Lawrence Tierney by the end of the first week of production because of his on-set behavior and volatility; he seemed (to some of the cast and crew) to be evincing psychological problems. Ultimately Tierney was fired, with Tarantino stating "Tierney was a f—ing nightmare. He was completely insane. He was so crazy... All the other actors and the crew can't stand him. And all of a sudden, he yells at me, does something disrespectful and so, I fired him at the breakfast table. The crew breaks into applause."

The warehouse scenes were filmed in an unused mortuary filled with caskets, funeral equipment, embalming fluid, and a hearse. Mr. Orange's apartment was a room on the second floor of the mortuary, set to look like living quarters. The building has since been demolished.

Tarantino's decision not to film the diamond robbery was twofold: for budgetary reasons, and to keep the details of the heist ambiguous. By not showing the robbery and having the characters describe it, Tarantino explained, the film is allowed to be "about other things", similar to the way in which the burglary in Glengarry Glen Ross and its film adaptation is discussed, described, and debated, but never shown. Tarantino compared the technique to the work of a novelist, and said he wanted the film to be about something not seen and to "play with a real-time clock as opposed to a movie clock ticking".

== Reception ==
=== Box office ===
Reservoir Dogs premiered at the Sundance Film Festival in January 1992. It became the festival's most talked-about film, and it was subsequently picked up for distribution by Miramax Films. After being shown at several other film festivals, including in Cannes, Sitges, and Toronto, Reservoir Dogs opened in the United States in 19 theaters on October 9, 1992, with a first week total of $147,839. It was expanded to 61 theaters on October 23, 1992, and totaled $2,832,029 at the domestic box office. The film grossed more than double that in the United Kingdom, where it did not receive a home video release until 1995. During the period of unavailability on home video, the film was re-released in UK cinemas in June 1994. In other European countries it had a more modest financial performance. In Spain, it sold 77,721 admissions for a total of 56.6 million pesetas ($550K).

=== Critical reception ===
At the film's premiere at the Sundance Film Festival, film critic Jami Bernard of the New York Daily News compared the effect of Reservoir Dogs to that of the 1895 film L'Arrivée d'un Train en Gare de la Ciotat, when audiences supposedly saw a moving train approaching the camera and ducked. Bernard said that Reservoir Dogs had a similar effect and people were not ready for it. Vincent Canby of The New York Times enjoyed the cast and the usage of non-linear storytelling. He similarly complimented Tarantino's directing and liked the fact that he did not often use close-ups in the film. Kenneth Turan of the Los Angeles Times also enjoyed the film and the acting, particularly that of Buscemi, Tierney and Madsen, and said "Tarantino's palpable enthusiasm, his unapologetic passion for what he's created, reinvigorates this venerable plot and, mayhem aside, makes it involving for longer than you might suspect." Critic James Berardinelli was of a similar opinion; he complimented both the cast and Tarantino's dialogue writing abilities. Hal Hinson of The Washington Post was also enthusiastic about the cast, complimenting the film on its "deadpan sense of humor".

Roger Ebert was less enthusiastic, as he felt that the script could have been better and said that the film "feels like it's going to be terrific", but Tarantino's script does not have much curiosity about the characters. He also said that Tarantino "has an idea, and trusts the idea to drive the plot." Ebert gave the film two and a half stars out of four and said that while he enjoyed it and that it was a very good film from a talented director, "I liked what I saw, but I wanted more."

The film has received substantial criticism for its strong violence and language. One scene that viewers found particularly unnerving was the ear-cutting scene. Madsen himself reportedly had great difficulty finishing it, especially after Kirk Baltz ad-libbed the desperate plea "I've got a little kid at home." Many people walked out during the film. During a screening at Sitges Film Festival, 15 people walked out, including horror film director Wes Craven and special makeup effects artist Rick Baker. Baker later told Tarantino to take the walkout as a "compliment" and explained that he found the violence unnerving because of its heightened sense of realism. Tarantino commented about it at the time: "It happens at every single screening. For some people the violence, or the rudeness of the language, is a mountain they can't climb. That's OK. It's not their cup of tea. But I am affecting them. I wanted that scene to be disturbing."

Some accused Tarantino of having plagiarized City on Fire, due to the plot similarities regarding the jewel store robbery and Mexican standoff, among other visuals shared by the two films, with detractors posting lengthy side-by-side comparisons online. Tarantino denied plagiarizing City on Fire at the 1994 Cannes film festival, citing it as an influence and stating: "I steal from every movie. I love it. If my work has anything it's that I'm taking this from this and that from that and mixing them together and if people don't like them then tough titty, don't go and see it, alright. I steal from everything. Great artists steal, they don't do homages." Ringo Lam, the director of City on Fire, stated he was not bothered by similarities between his film and Reservoir Dogs, comparing it to the elements he had taken from Hollywood films.

Reservoir Dogs is regarded as an important and influential milestone of independent filmmaking. Review aggregation website Rotten Tomatoes gives the film an approval rating of 90% based on 84 reviews, with an average rating of 9.00/10. The site's critical consensus reads, "Thrumming with intelligence and energy, Reservoir Dogs opens Quentin Tarantino's filmmaking career with hard-hitting style." On Metacritic the film has an average score of 81 out of 100, based on 24 critics, indicating "universal acclaim". Empire magazine named it the "Greatest Independent Film" ever made.

=== Analysis ===
Reservoir Dogs has often been seen as a prominent film in terms of on-screen violence. J. P. Telotte compared Reservoir Dogs to classic caper noir films and points out the irony in its ending scenes. Mark Irwin also made the connection between Reservoir Dogs and classic American noir. Caroline Jewers called Reservoir Dogs a "feudal epic" and paralleled the color pseudonyms to color names of medieval knights.

Critics have observed parallels between Reservoir Dogs and other films. For its nonlinear storyline, Reservoir Dogs has often been compared to Akira Kurosawa's Rashomon. Critic John Hartl compared the ear-cutting scene to the shower murder scene in Alfred Hitchcock's Psycho and Tarantino to David Lynch. He furthermore explored parallels between Reservoir Dogs and Glengarry Glen Ross. Todd McCarthy, who called the film "undeniably impressive", was of the opinion that it was influenced by Mean Streets, Goodfellas, and Stanley Kubrick's The Killing. After this film, Tarantino himself was also compared to Martin Scorsese, Sam Peckinpah, John Singleton, Gus Van Sant, and Abel Ferrara.

A frequently cited comparison has been to Tarantino's second and more successful film Pulp Fiction, especially since the majority of audiences saw Reservoir Dogs after the success of Pulp Fiction. Comparisons have been made regarding the black humor in both the films, the theme of accidents, and more concretely, the style of dialogue and narrative that Tarantino incorporates into both films. Specifically the relationship between white people and black people plays a big part in the films—though underplayed in Reservoir Dogs. Stanley Crouch of The New York Times compared the way the white criminals speak of black people in Reservoir Dogs to the way they are spoken of in Scorsese's Mean Streets and Goodfellas. Crouch observed the way black people are looked down upon in Reservoir Dogs, but also the way that the criminals accuse each other of "verbally imitating" black men and the characters' apparent sexual attraction to black actress Pam Grier.

In February 2012, as part of an ongoing series of live dramatic readings of film scripts being staged with the Los Angeles County Museum of Art (LACMA), director Jason Reitman cast black actors in the originally white cast: Laurence Fishburne as Mr. White; Terrence Howard as Mr. Blonde; Anthony Mackie as Mr. Pink; Cuba Gooding Jr. as Mr. Orange; Chi McBride as Joe Cabot; Anthony Anderson as Nice Guy Eddie (Joe Cabot's son); Common as both Mr. Brown and Officer Nash (the torture victim of Mr. Blonde), and Patton Oswalt as Holdaway (the mentor cop who was originally played by Randy Brooks, the only black actor in the film). Critic Elvis Mitchell suggested that Reitman's version of the script was taking the source material back to its roots since the characters "all sound like black dudes."

== Accolades ==
The film was screened out of competition at the 1992 Cannes Film Festival. It won the Critic's Award at the 4th Yubari International Fantastic Film Festival in February 1993, which Tarantino attended. The film was also nominated for the Grand Prix of the Belgian Syndicate of Cinema Critics. Steve Buscemi won the 1992 Independent Spirit Award for Best Supporting Male. Reservoir Dogs ranks at No. 97 in Empire magazine's list of the 500 Greatest Films of All Time. In 2024, Reservoir Dogs was ranked second on the list of the Sundance Film Festival's Top 10 films of All Time based on a survey conducted with 500 filmmakers and critics in honor of the festival's 40th anniversary.

- AFI's 100 Years... 100 Heroes & Villains:
  - Mr. Blonde – Nominated Villain

== Home media ==
In the United Kingdom, release of the VHS rental video was delayed until 1995 due to the British Board of Film Classification initially refusing the film a home video certificate (UK releases are required to be certified separately for theatrical release and for viewing at home). The latter is a requirement by law due to the Video Recordings Act 1984. Following the UK VHS release approval, PolyGram released a "Mr Blonde Deluxe Edition", which included an interview with Tarantino and several memorabilia associated with the character Mr. Blonde, such as sunglasses and a chrome toothpick holder.

Region 1 DVDs of Reservoir Dogs have been released multiple times. The first release was a single two-sided disc from LIVE Entertainment, released in June 1997 and featuring two versions of the film: the original letterbox 2.35:1 widescreen version and an open matte 1.33:1 full screen version. Five years later, on August 27, 2002, Artisan Entertainment (who changed their name from LIVE Entertainment in the interim) released a two-disc 10th anniversary edition on DVD and VHS featuring multiple covers color-coded to match the nicknames of five of the characters (Pink, White, Orange, Blonde, and Brown) and a disc of bonus features such as interviews with the cast and crew. However, the full screen version on the second disc was a pan and scan transfer from the 2.35:1 widescreen version, as opposed to open matte like the 1997 DVD.

For the film's 15th anniversary, Lionsgate (which had purchased Artisan in the interim) produced a two-disc anniversary edition with a remastered 16:9 transfer and a new supplement, but not all of the extra features from the 10th Anniversary edition. In particular, the interviews with the cast and crew were removed, and a new 48-minute-long feature called "Tributes and Dedications" was included.

Lionsgate Home Entertainment celebrated the 30th anniversary of Reservoir Dogs with a 4K Blu-ray release, which was released in the U.S. on November 15, 2022.

== Soundtrack ==
The Reservoir Dogs: Original Motion Picture Soundtrack was the first soundtrack for a Tarantino film and set the structure his later soundtracks would follow. This includes the extensive use of snippets of dialogue from the film. The soundtrack has selections of songs from the 1960s to '80s. Only the group Bedlam recorded original songs for the film. Reasoning that the film takes place over a weekend, Tarantino decided to set it to a fictional radio station 'K-Billy' (presumably KBLY)'s show "K-Billy's Super Sounds of the Seventies Weekend", a themed weekend show of songs from the seventies. The radio station played a prominent role in the film. The DJ for the radio was chosen to be Steven Wright, a comedian known for his deadpan delivery of jokes.

An unusual feature of the soundtrack was the choice of songs; Tarantino has said that he feels the music to be a counterpoint to the on-screen violence and action. He also stated that he wished for the film to have a 1950s feel while using '70s music. A prominent instance of this is the torture scene to the tune of "Stuck in the Middle with You".

== Video games ==
A video game based on the film was released in 2006 for PC, Xbox, and PlayStation 2. Only Michael Madsen reprised his role from the film. The game was received unfavorably, with GameSpot calling it "an out and out failure". It caused controversy for its amount of violence and it was banned in Australia, Germany and New Zealand.

Another video game, Reservoir Dogs: Bloody Days, was released in 2017.

On December 14, 2017, Overkill Software added a heist to Payday 2 inspired by Reservoir Dogs in which the player is contracted to rob a jewelry store in Los Angeles with the Cabot family. It is unique in that the heist is played in reverse order, with day two occurring prior to day one, similar to how the film's plot is out of chronological order.

== Remakes ==
Kaante, a Bollywood film released in 2002, is a remake of Reservoir Dogs, combined with elements of City on Fire. The film also borrows plot points from Heat and The Killing. Tarantino has been quoted as saying that Kaante is his favorite among the many films inspired by his work. Tarantino later screened Kaante at his New Beverly Cinema alongside Reservoir Dogs and City on Fire.

Tarantino revealed in June 2021 that he had at one point considered remaking Reservoir Dogs as his tenth and final directed film, though he quickly iterated that he "won't do it".

== See also ==
- Heist film
- List of cult films
- Kaante (2002), which was inspired by Reservoir Dogs
- List of works by Quentin Tarantino
