= Boogie Boy =

1998 film written and directed by Craig Hamann

- Directed by: Craig Hamann
- Written by: Craig Hamann
- Produced by: Braddon Mendelson
- Starring: Mark Dacascos; Emily Lloyd; Traci Lords; Jaimz Woolvett
- Cinematography: Adam Kane
- Edited by: Glenn Garland
- Music by: Tim Truman
- Release date: February 12, 1998
- Running time: 104 minutes
- Country: United States
- Language: English

Boogie Boy is a 1998 film written and directed by Craig Hamann and produced by Braddon Mendelson. It stars Traci Lords, as well as Mark Dacascos, Emily Lloyd, Jaimz Woolvett, Frederic Forrest, Joan Jett, Robert Bauer, and Linnea Quigley. The film features music by Michael Knott.

== Premise ==
A man who has just been released from prison vows to start a new life, but is put to the test when an old cellmate appears.

== Cast ==
- Mark Dacascos as Jesse Page
- Emily Lloyd as Hester
- Jaimz Woolvett as Larry Storey
- Traci Lords as Shonda Lee Bragg
- Karen Sheperd as Marlene
- Linnea Quigley as Gretchen
- Jonathan Scarfe as Leland Bowles
- John Koyama as Lawrence Wong
- Ethan Jensen as Dave
- Phil Culotta as Mike
- Frederic Forrest as Edsel Dundee
- Ben Browder as Freddy
- James Lew as Jason
- Scott Sowers as "Bulldog"
- Robert Bauer as "Breeze"
- John Hawkes as "T-Bone"
- Joan Jett as "Jerk"
- Michael Pena as Drug Dealer
- Brett R. Goetsch as Roadie
- Tony Bruno as Rocket Brutes Band Member
- Sean Koos as Rocket Brutes Band Member
- Tommy Price as Rocket Brutes Band Member
- Rich Turner as The Bartender
