= Kill Bill: The Whole Bloody Affair =

2004 film by Quentin Tarantino

- Theatrical release poster
- Directed by: Quentin Tarantino
- Written by: Quentin Tarantino
- Produced by: Lawrence Bender
- Starring: Uma Thurman; Lucy Liu; Vivica A. Fox; Daryl Hannah; Michael Madsen; Sonny Chiba; Julie Dreyfus; Chiaki Kuriyama; Gordon Liu; Michael Parks; David Carradine
- Cinematography: Robert Richardson
- Edited by: Sally Menke
- Music by: RZA; Robert Rodriguez
- Production companies: Miramax Films; A Band Apart
- Distributed by: Lionsgate
- Release dates: May 23, 2004 (Cannes Film Festival); December 5, 2025 (United States)
- Running time: 253 minutes
- Country: United States
- Language: English
- Budget: $60 million (Note: The combined budget of The Whole Bloody Affair is $60 million, with the budget of Volume 1 being $30 million and Volume 2 also being $30 million.)
- Box office: $347.5 million (Note: $180.9 million from Volume 1, $153.3 million from Volume 2, and $13.3 million from The Whole Bloody Affair)

Kill Bill: The Whole Bloody Affair is a 2004 American martial arts film written and directed by Quentin Tarantino. It combines the films Kill Bill: Volume 1 (2003) and Kill Bill: Volume 2 (2004), which were conceived and produced as a single film, but split in two. Uma Thurman stars as the Bride, who swears revenge on a group of assassins after they try to kill her and her unborn child.

The Whole Bloody Affair premiered at the Cannes Film Festival on May 23, 2004, before screening at Tarantino's New Beverly Cinema on March 27, 2011. Tarantino said he had waited until he owned the rights before giving the film a full release and thought that asking audiences to come to his theater gave it more meaning. It was theatrically released in the United States by Lionsgate on December 5, 2025, to acclaim.

Tarantino also directed an animated short, The Lost Chapter: Yuki's Revenge, which debuted in the video game Fortnite and was included after the credits of theatrical screenings of The Whole Bloody Affair.

== Plot ==
In 1999, the Bride, a former member of the Deadly Viper Assassination Squad, is rehearsing her marriage at a chapel in El Paso, Texas. The Deadly Vipers, led by Bill, attack the chapel, shooting everyone. As the Bride lies wounded, she tells Bill he is the father of her unborn child just as he shoots her in the head.

The Bride falls into a coma. In the hospital, Elle Driver, one of the Deadly Vipers, prepares to assassinate her via lethal injection. Bill calls Elle and aborts the mission, considering it dishonorable to kill her while she is defenseless. The Bride awakens four years later and is horrified to discover she is no longer pregnant. She vows to kill Bill and the other Deadly Vipers.

The Bride obtains a sword from the legendary swordsmith Hattori Hanzō in Okinawa. In Tokyo, she defeats a squad of yakuza fighters, the Crazy 88, and assassinates their leader, the former Deadly Viper O-Ren Ishii. In Pasadena, California, the Bride kills Vernita Green, a former Deadly Viper, at her suburban home.

In Barstow, California, Bill's brother Budd, another Deadly Viper, incapacitates the Bride, sedates her, and buries her alive in a coffin. The Bride uses techniques taught to her by the martial arts master Pai Mei to escape. Elle Driver arranges to buy the Bride's sword from Budd and kills him with a black mamba hidden within a case full of money at his trailer. As Elle exits, the Bride, now addressed by her real name Beatrix Kiddo, ambushes her and they fight. Beatrix plucks out Elle's remaining eye and leaves her screaming in the trailer with the black mamba.

Beatrix tracks Bill to his home in Mexico and discovers that their daughter, B.B., is still alive, now four years old. Beatrix spends the evening with them. After she puts B.B. to bed, Bill shoots Beatrix with a dart containing truth serum and interrogates her. She explains that she left the Deadly Vipers when she discovered she was pregnant, in order to give B.B. a better life. Bill explains that he assumed she was dead and had ordered her assassination when he discovered she was alive and engaged to a "jerk" he assumed was the father of her child. The two begin to fight, but Beatrix traps Bill's sword in her scabbard and strikes him with the Five Point Palm Exploding Heart Technique, an attack learned from Pai Mei. Bill reconciles with her, then falls dead as he walks away. Beatrix leaves with B.B. to start a new life.

== Cast ==
- Uma Thurman as Beatrix "the Bride" Kiddo (code name Black Mamba), a former member of the Deadly Viper Assassination Squad, described as "the deadliest woman in the world".
- Lucy Liu as O-Ren Ishii (code name Cottonmouth), a former Deadly Viper who has become the leader of the yakuza in Tokyo.
  - Ai Maeda as O-Ren Ishii (The Origin of O-Ren sequence) (voice)
- Vivica A. Fox as Vernita Green (code name Copperhead), a former Deadly Viper and now a mother and homemaker living under the name Jeannie Bell.
- Daryl Hannah as Elle Driver (code name California Mountain Snake), a former Deadly Viper, Bill's lover and the Bride's fourth target.
- Michael Madsen as Budd (code name Sidewinder), a former Deadly Viper and Bill's brother, working as a strip club bouncer. He is the Bride's third target.
- Sonny Chiba as Hattori Hanzō, a sushi chef and long-retired master swordsmith.
- Julie Dreyfus as Sofie Fatale, O-Ren's lawyer, confidante, best friend and second lieutenant. She is also a former protégée of Bill's and is present at the wedding chapel massacre.
- Chiaki Kuriyama as Gogo Yubari, O-Ren's sadistic Japanese schoolgirl bodyguard.
- Gordon Liu as Pai Mei: An immensely powerful and extremely old martial arts master. Beatrix, Bill, and Elle all train under him. Liu also appears as a separate character, Johnny Mo, leader of the yakuza gang The Crazy 88's.
- Michael Parks as Ranger Earl McGraw, a Texas Ranger who investigates the wedding chapel massacre. Parks originated McGraw in the Robert Rodriguez film From Dusk till Dawn, which Tarantino wrote and acted in. He reprised the role in both segments of the Rodriguez/Tarantino collaboration Grindhouse. Parks also appears as a separate character, Esteban Vihaio, a retired pimp and the first of Bill's "father figures".
- David Carradine as Bill (code name Snake Charmer), the former leader of the Deadly Vipers, the Bride's former lover, and the father of her daughter.
- Michael Bowen as Buck, an orderly at the hospital who has been raping and prostituting the Bride while she lay comatose.
- Jun Kunimura as Boss Tanaka, a yakuza whom O-Ren executes after he ridicules her ethnicity and gender.
- Kenji Ohba as Shiro, Hattori Hanzo's employee.
- Yuki Kazamatsuri as the Proprietress of the House of Blue Leaves.
- James Parks as Ranger Edgar McGraw, a Texas Ranger and son of Earl McGraw.
- Goro Daimon as Boss Honda
- Shun Sugata as Boss Genta
- Akaji Maro as Boss Ozawah
- Kazuki Kitamura as Boss Koji, a yakuza working for O-Ren. He also appeared as Bodyguard #2 in O-Ren's army, the Crazy 88.
- The 5.6.7.8's (Sachiko Fuji, Yoshiko Yamaguchi and Ronnie Yoshiko Fujiyama) as themselves, performing at the House of Blue Leaves.
- Jonathan Loughran as Buck's trucker client, killed by the Bride after he attempts to rape her.
- Sakichi Sato as "Charlie Brown", a House of Blue Leaves employee who wears a kimono similar to the shirt worn by the Peanuts character.
- Ambrosia Kelley as Nakia "Nikki" Bell, Vernita's four-year-old daughter.
- Yōji Tanaka as Crazy 88 #3
- Issey Takahashi as Crazy 88 #4
- Juri Manase as Crazy 88 #6
- Naomi Kusumi as Boss Matsumoto (The Origin of O-Ren sequence) (voice)
- Hikaru Midorikawa as Pretty Riki (The Origin of O-Ren sequence) (voice)
- Stephanie L. Moore, Shana Stein, and Caitlin Keats as Joleen, Erica, and Janeen: Beatrix's best friends who are present at the wedding rehearsal.
- Bo Svenson as Reverend Harmony: The minister who was to officiate at Beatrix and Tommy's wedding.
- Jeannie Epper as Mrs. Harmony: Reverend Harmony's wife.
- Chris Nelson as Tommy Plympton: Beatrix's fiancé who is killed in the wedding chapel massacre.
- Samuel L. Jackson as Rufus: The organist who was to perform at Beatrix and Tommy's wedding.
- Larry Bishop as Larry Gomez: The abusive manager of the strip club at which Budd works.
- Sid Haig as Jay: An employee at the strip club where Budd works.
- Laura Cayouette as Rocket: A stripper who works at the strip club where Budd works.
- Clark Middleton as Ernie: A friend of Budd's who helps him bury Beatrix alive.
- Perla Haney-Jardine as B. B.: The daughter of Beatrix and Bill. She is raised by her father while her mother is comatose.
- Lawrence Bender as Hotel Worker (Uncredited cameo)
- Helen Kim as Karen Kim: An assassin sent to kill Beatrix, ultimately sparing her, after Beatrix informs her that she is pregnant.

== Development ==
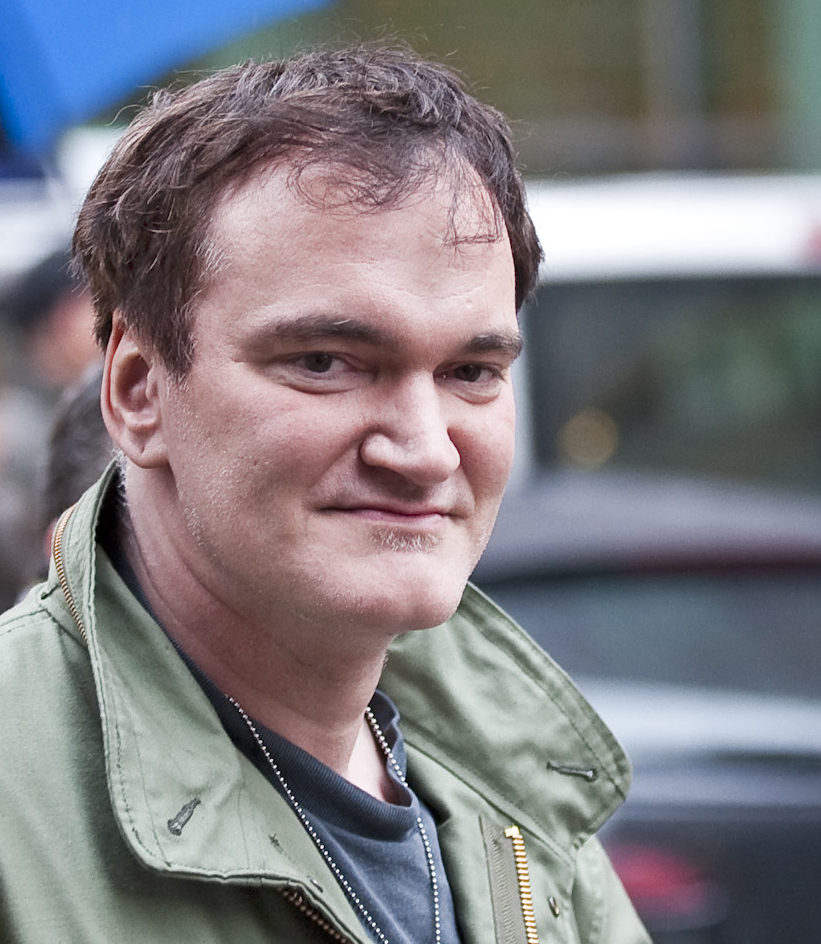
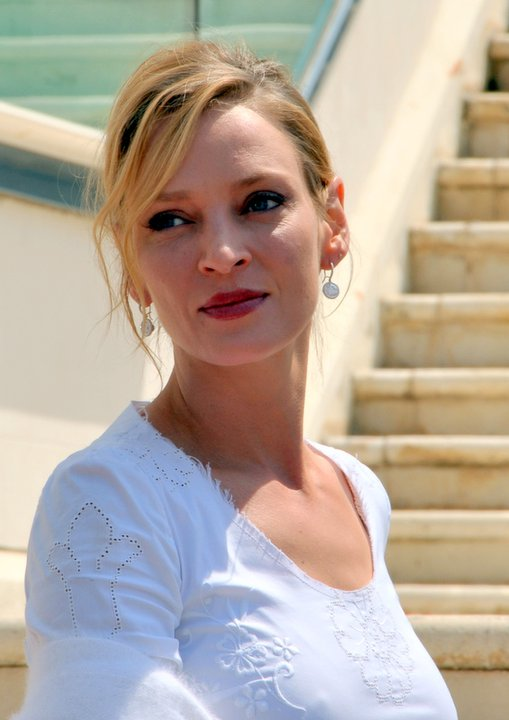
Quentin Tarantino and Uma Thurman

Quentin Tarantino wrote and produced Kill Bill as a single film. After editing began, the executive producer Harvey Weinstein, who was known for pressuring filmmakers to shorten their films, suggested that Tarantino split the film in two. This meant Tarantino did not have to cut scenes, such as the anime sequence. Tarantino told IGN: "I'm talking about scenes that are some of the best scenes in the movie, but in this hurdling pace where you're trying to tell only one story, that would have been the stuff that would have had to go. But to me, that's kind of what the movie was, are these little detours and these little grace notes." The decision was announced in July 2003.

== The Lost Chapter: Yuki's Revenge ==
In 2025, The Lost Chapter: Yuki's Revenge, a short animated film by Tarantino, Epic Games and the Third Floor, was announced. It is based on an early Kill Bill draft that included a chapter after the confrontation with Vernita, in which the Bride has a gunfight with Gogo Yubari's vengeful sister Yuki, voiced by Miyu Ishidate Roberts. It was originally cut because it would have made the film overlong and added $1 million to the budget.

Yuki's Revenge was animated in Unreal Engine 5 using models from the video game Fortnite. Thurman reprised her role as the Bride in voice acting and motion-capture; Zoë Bell performed the stunts in motion capture; Bill was voiced by Tarantino, replacing Carradine, who died in 2009. The short premiered in Fortnite on November 30, 2025, and uploaded on Fortnite's YouTube channel on December 4, a day before the theatrical release of The Whole Bloody Affair. It was also shown as part of the theatrical run of The Whole Bloody Affair after the closing credits.

== Release ==
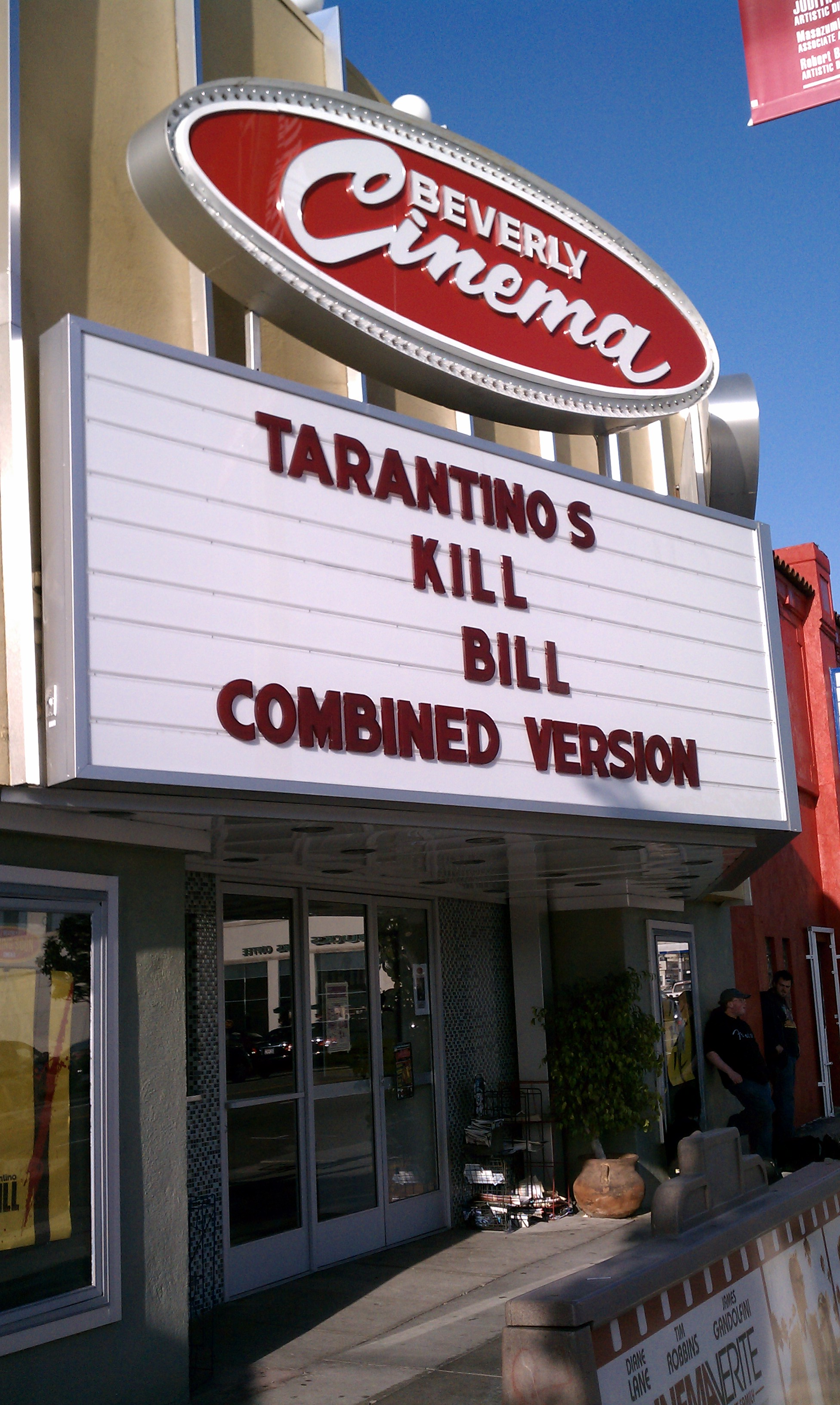
The film was screened at Tarantino's New Beverly Cinema on March 27, 2011.

Kill Bill: The Whole Bloody Affair premiered at the Cannes Film Festival, out of competition, on May 23, 2004. The film was set to be theatrically released in 2005, as a roadshow presentation, before being canceled. At the 2008 Provincetown International Film Festival, Tarantino announced that it would be theatrically released in May 2009, before being delayed. The film was screened on March 27, 2011, at Tarantino's New Beverly Cinema.

In July 2014, Tarantino said that he and the Weinstein Company planned for The Whole Bloody Affair to have a limited theatrical release within the following year. This version was set to include an extended anime sequence, which had been commissioned, financed, and produced by Production I.G based on the original script without Tarantino's request. The film had a limited theatrical release in July 2025, at Tarantino's Vista Theater. Tarantino said he had waited until he owned the rights before giving it a full release and thought that asking audiences to come to his theater gave it more meaning. The Whole Bloody Affair was given a nationwide theatrical release by Lionsgate on December 5, 2025.

=== Box office ===
As of October 6, 2026, The Whole Bloody affair grossed a total of $6 million in the United States and $7.3 million in other territories for a worldwide total of $13.3 million. In the United States, the film made $1.6 million from 1,198 theaters on its opening day, and was expected to make $4 million in its 3-day opening weekend. The film ended up grossing $3.4 million in its opening weekend.

=== Home media ===
In August 2025, Tarantino said he may never release The Whole Bloody Affair on home video as he preferred to keep it exclusive to theaters. However, it was released on VOD on February 17, 2026. The film was then released on Peacock on May 22, 2026. It was released on 4K UHD and Blu-ray on July 28, 2026, through Lionsgate Limited. Lionsgate previously announced that they had purchased the distribution rights to both Kill Bill films, and announced a UHD release for the film's 20th anniversary; both films were released on Blu-ray and DVD on October 10, 2023, and in 4K on physical and digital on January 21, 2025.

== Reception ==
On the review aggregator website Rotten Tomatoes, 100% of 37 critics' reviews are positive, with an average rating of 9.2/10. The website's consensus reads: "Merging both Kill Bill volumes together into a whole that's as seamless as a slice from a Hattori Hanzō sword, this Bloody Affair finally realizes the full grandeur of Quentin Tarantino's gonzo vision." Metacritic, which uses a weighted average, assigned the film a score of 95 out of 100, based on 12 critics, indicating "universal acclaim". Audiences polled by CinemaScore gave it a rare "A+" on an A+ to F scale.

Richard Whittaker of The Austin Chronicle gave the film four and a half out of five, writing: "Tarantino finally gets to complete his own work of cinematic archeology, and what he exhumes springs to life like the first time it was projected". Matt Zoller Seitz of RogerEbert.com gave it four out of four and wrote: "Whatever your feelings about Tarantino and his work, this is a tremendous visceral experience, with radiant colors, slate-somber black-and-white, and geysers of crimson blood. To quote the end of another Tarantino film, it just might be his masterpiece".

== See also ==
- List of works by Quentin Tarantino
