= Anywhere, U.S.A. =

- Directed by: Chusy Haney-Jardine
- Written by: Chusy Haney-Jardine; Jennifer Macdonald
- Produced by: Jennifer Macdonald; Andy O'Neil (co-prod.)
- Starring: Perla Haney-Jardine; Jeremiah Brennan; Mike Ellis; Mary Griffin; Rafat Abu-Goush; Molly Surrett; Sheliah Ray Hipps; Brian Fox; Ralph Brierley; Dianne Chapman; Ellis Robinson
- Cinematography: Patrick Rousseau
- Edited by: Chusy Haney-Jardine
- Music by: Arizona; Holiday Childress; Chusy Haney-Jardine; Chris Rosser; Jason Smith
- Production company: Found Films
- Distributed by: Cinevolve Studios
- Release date: January 17, 2008 (Sundance Film Festival)
- Running time: 123 minutes
- Country: United States
- Language: English

Anywhere, U.S.A. is a 2008 feature film directed by Chusy Haney-Jardine and starring mostly non-professional actors. The film is told in three parts: Penance, Loss, and Ignorance, with each story obliquely related to the next. Anywhere, U.S.A premiered in dramatic competition at the 2008 Sundance Film Festival where it won the "Special Jury Prize for Spirit of Independence".

== Plot ==
His first feature film, Chusy had originally envisioned his movie as twenty different stories. Of those twenty, four stories were shot in their entirety, and two stories were started but never finished. The fourth story, tentatively titled "Holes," was excluded from the final cut to avoid an extended runtime and to ensure by implication its chance to compete in the Sundance Film Festival.

=== Part 1:Penance ===
Penance, the opening story of the film, follows a woman who just discovered the Internet, her philandering boyfriend, and his jingoistic sidekick who happens to be a dwarf.

=== Part 2: Loss ===
Loss, originally titled Wanderlings, is the second story in the film. Perla Haney-Jardine stars as Pearl, an 8-year-old girl who faces an existential crisis during her pursuit of the tooth fairy.

=== Part 3: Ignorance ===
Ignorance, tentatively titled Black and White, is the third and final act of the film.

== Production history ==
In September 2005, a week prior to the first scheduled day of production, Chusy contracted Rocky Mountain Spotted Fever. Bedridden with debilitating headaches and sustained high fevers, the disease sent Chusy into a near-comatose state. Over the next few weeks, he slowly recovered, and feeling the pressures of time and money, Chusy made the executive decision to start production, shooting on the Panasonic Varicam. The first official shoot day was November 1, 2005, however, on Thanksgiving Day 2005, having not yet fully recovered and dissatisfied with the material he was getting, Chusy decided to halt production indefinitely.

In March 2006, Chusy flew in cinematographer and long-time friend, Patrick Rousseau, to perform camera tests on Panasonic's new P2 camcorder, the HVX200. The camera's relaxed workflow was a breakthrough for Chusy, and having had several months to recover, Chusy took advantage of Patrick's availability and resumed production on March 21, 2006. This also marked the first official shoot day for the story Loss, which appears as the second story in film. The last official shoot day for Loss was April 9, 2006. The crew began shooting Holes on April 5, 2006. While it does not appear in the final cut of the film, the last official shoot day for Holes was April 14, 2006. From April 15 to July 7, 2006, Chusy shot fifteen days pickups and reshoots for Loss and Holes in Patrick's absence.

July 20, 2006 marked the first official shoot day for Penance, which appears as the first story in the film. The last official shoot day for Penance was August 14, 2006. August 9, 2006 marked the first official shoot day for Ignorance, which appears as the third story in the film. The last official shoot day for "Ignorance" was August 20, 2006.

Patrick Rousseau flew back to Asheville, NC to shoot reshoots for the story Penance from February 13 to 18, 2007. The remaining voice over work was recorded in Chusy's home with Virato.

== Festivals and awards ==
Festival	Award
2008
2008 Sundance Film Festival	Special Jury Prize (Dramatic, The Spirit of Independence)
Cinequest Film & Creativity Festival	
Philadelphia Film Festival	
Calgary International Film Festival	
BFI London Film Festival	
Stockholm International Film Festival	
2009
Jacksonville Film Festival	Best USA Feature Film
Chicago Underground Film Festival	Opening Night Film
Boston Underground Film Festival	Director's Choice Award for Best Feature
