= Future Weather (film) =

- Film poster
- Directed by: Jenny Deller
- Written by: Jenny Deller
- Produced by: Jenny Deller; Kristin Fairweather
- Starring: Perla Haney-Jardine; Lili Taylor; Amy Madigan; Marin Ireland
- Cinematography: Zak Mulligan
- Edited by: Shelby Siegel
- Production companies: Future Weather Productions; Present Pictures
- Distributed by: First Pond Pictures
- Release date: April 29, 2012 (Tribeca)
- Running time: 100 minutes
- Country: United States
- Language: English

Future Weather is a 2012 American drama film written and directed by Jenny Deller and starring Perla Haney-Jardine, Lili Taylor, Amy Madigan and Marin Ireland.

== Cast ==
- Perla Haney-Jardine as Lauduree
- Lili Taylor as Ms. Markovi
- Amy Madigan as Greta
- Marin Ireland as Tanya
- William Sadler as Ed
- Anubhav Jain as Neel
- Jenny Dare Paulin as Crystal
- Michael Porter as Tommy

== Reception ==
On the review aggregator website Rotten Tomatoes, 93% of 14 critics' reviews are positive. Metacritic, which uses a weighted average, assigned the film a score of 67 out of 100, based on 7 critics, indicating "generally favorable" reviews.

Roger Ebert awarded the film three and a half stars.
