= Natalie Denise Sperl =

American actress

- Occupations: Model, film/television actress
- Years active: 1995–present

Natalie Denise Sperl is an American model and film and television actress known for her appearances in the films Mank, Succubus: Hell Bent, Rock Monster, and Around the World in 80 Days.

== Career ==
An Esquire cover girl and former Coors Light Girl who co-starred with Kid Rock in the Coors Light Super Bowl commercial directed by Michael Bay, Sperl was a runway model in Europe, working for such designers as Cynthia Rowley and Alexander McQueen at Central Saint Martins in London. She then landed several magazine covers before moving to Los Angeles to be an actress. She has over 50 acting credits, including TV shows Two and A Half Men, How I Met Your Mother, and NCIS, and films such as Rock Monster, Succubus: Hell Bent, and Mank.

Sperl honed her comedy skills at The Second City, where she created several sketch characters and celebrity impersonations, including Gwen Stefani and Melania Trump. She developed these characters on her YouTube series "The Sperliegirl Show". She has done standup at The Comedy Store Belly Room, The Improv, and The Comedy Union in Los Angeles.

Sperl is a singer-songwriter and the front woman of the band Kill My Coquette.

== Filmography ==
Film
Year	Film	Role	Notes
2023	Gunfight at Rio Bravo		
2011	After You	Kristin	post-production
2011	Getting Back to Zero	Julie Snake Eyes	
2008	Round	Gina Laurie	
2008	Trapped in Perfection	Jannies	
2007	Alibi	Gia	
2004	Mojave	Sexy office girl	
2004	Little Black Book	Natalie	
2004	Around the World in 80 Days	Stunning Woman	as Natalie Sperl
2004	Larceny	Waitress	
Television
Year	Title	Role	Notes
2008	NCIS	Milaana Shishani	1 episode
2008	Unhitched	Kara	1 episode
2008	Rock Monster (TV movie)	Cassandra	
2007	Succubus: Hell Bent (video)	Lilith	
2006	Big Day	Sequoia	1 episode
2006	Two and a Half Men	Janie	1 episode
2006	Last Call (video)	Lucy	
2006	The Graveyard (video)	Zoe	
2006	CSI: Miami	Melissa Bowman Rowe	1 episode
2006	Three Strikes (TV movie)	Cindy	
2006	Breaking Up with Shannen Doherty	Herself	
2005	How I Met Your Mother	Natalya	1 episode
2005	Portrait of a Man and a Woman: Los Angeles, c. 2004 (short)	Nina	
2003	What Should You Do?	Female Victim	1 episode
2003	A.U.S.A.	Juror No. 8	1 episode
2003	Other Side of the Road (short)		
