= Kill Bill: Volume 2 =

2004 American film by Quentin Tarantino

- Theatrical release poster
- Directed by: Quentin Tarantino
- Written by: Quentin Tarantino
- Produced by: Lawrence Bender
- Starring: Uma Thurman; David Carradine; Michael Madsen; Daryl Hannah; Gordon Liu; Michael Parks
- Cinematography: Robert Richardson
- Edited by: Sally Menke
- Music by: RZA; Robert Rodriguez
- Production company: A Band Apart
- Distributed by: Miramax Films
- Release dates: April 8, 2004 (Cinerama Dome); April 16, 2004 (United States)
- Running time: 137 minutes
- Country: United States
- Language: English
- Budget: $30 million
- Box office: $153.3 million

Kill Bill: Volume 2 is a 2004 American martial arts film written and directed by Quentin Tarantino. It stars Uma Thurman as the Bride, who continues her campaign of revenge against the Deadly Viper Assassination Squad (Daryl Hannah, Vivica A. Fox, Lucy Liu, and Michael Madsen) and their leader Bill (David Carradine), who tried to kill her and their unborn child.

Tarantino conceived Kill Bill as an homage to low-budget cinema, including exploitation films, martial arts films, samurai cinema, blaxploitation and spaghetti westerns. Volume 2 is the second of two Kill Bill films produced simultaneously; the first, Volume 1, was released six months earlier. The films were set for a single release, but the film, with a runtime of over four hours, was divided in two.

Kill Bill: Volume 2 premiered at the Cinerama Dome on April 8, 2004, and was released by Miramax Films on April 16, 2004. The film received positive reviews and grossed $152.3 million worldwide on a production budget of $30 million. Tarantino had planned to make further Kill Bill films in the following years, but abandoned those plans by 2023. A single film combining both parts, Kill Bill: The Whole Bloody Affair, was theatrically released on December 5, 2025.

== Plot ==
The pregnant Bride and her groom rehearse their wedding. Bill, the Bride's former lover and the leader of the Deadly Viper Assassination Squad, arrives unexpectedly and orders the Deadly Vipers to kill everyone at the wedding rehearsal. Bill shoots the Bride in the head, but she survives and swears revenge.

Four years later, the Bride, having already assassinated Deadly Vipers O-Ren Ishii and Vernita Green, (Note: As depicted in Kill Bill: Volume 1 (2003)) goes to the trailer of Bill's brother Budd, another Deadly Viper, planning to ambush him. Having been forewarned by Bill, he incapacitates her with a non-lethal shotgun blast of rock salt and sedates her. He calls Elle Driver, another former Deadly Viper, and arranges to sell her the Bride's sword for $1 million. He seals the Bride inside a coffin and buries her alive.

Years earlier, Bill tells the young Bride of the legendary martial arts master Pai Mei and his Five Point Palm Exploding Heart Technique, a death blow that Pai refuses to teach his students; properly used, the attack reputedly renders an opponent able to take only five steps before dying. Bill takes the Bride to Pai's temple for training. Pai ridicules and torments her during training, but she eventually gains his respect. In the present, the Bride uses Pai's techniques to escape from the coffin and claw her way to the surface.

Elle arrives at Budd's trailer and kills him with a black mamba hidden within the case full of money for the sword. She calls Bill and tells him that the Bride has killed Budd and that she has killed the Bride, using the Bride's real name: Beatrix Kiddo. As Elle exits the trailer, Beatrix ambushes her and they fight. Elle, who was also taught by Pai, taunts Beatrix by revealing that she killed Pai by poisoning his favorite meal in retribution for him plucking out her eye after she called him "a miserable old fool". Enraged, Beatrix plucks out Elle's remaining eye, blinding her, and leaves her screaming and stumbling in the trailer with the black mamba.

In Acuña, Mexico, Beatrix meets a retired pimp, Esteban Vellajo, who helps her find Bill. She tracks him to his home, and discovers that their daughter B.B. is still alive, now four years old. Beatrix spends the evening with them. After she puts B.B. to bed, Bill shoots Beatrix with a dart containing truth serum and interrogates her. She explains that upon discovering her pregnancy, she deserted the Deadly Vipers to give B.B. a better life. Bill explains that he assumed she was dead; he ordered her assassination when he discovered she was alive and engaged to a "jerk" he assumed was the father of her child. The two begin to fight, but Beatrix traps Bill's sword in her scabbard and strikes him with the Five Point Palm Exploding Heart Technique. Surprised that Pai taught her the attack, Bill reconciles with her, then after taking five steps, he falls dead as she walks away. Beatrix leaves with B.B. to start a new life.

== Cast ==
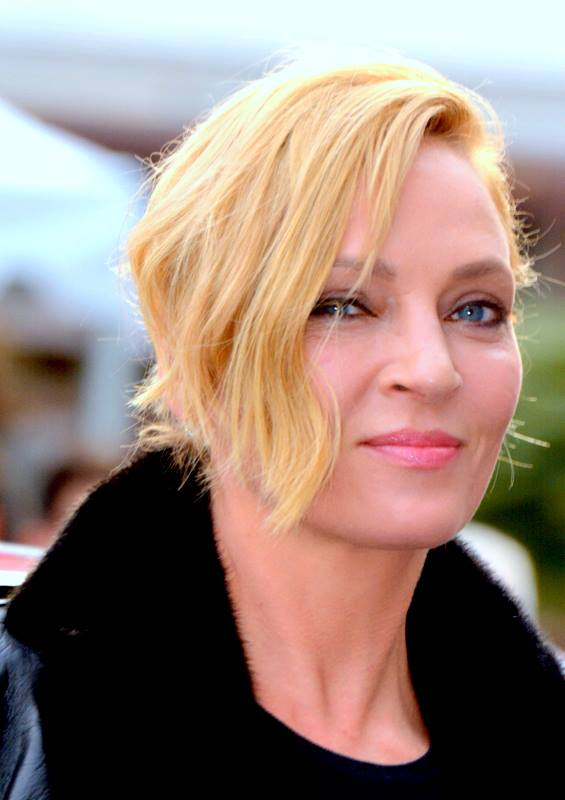
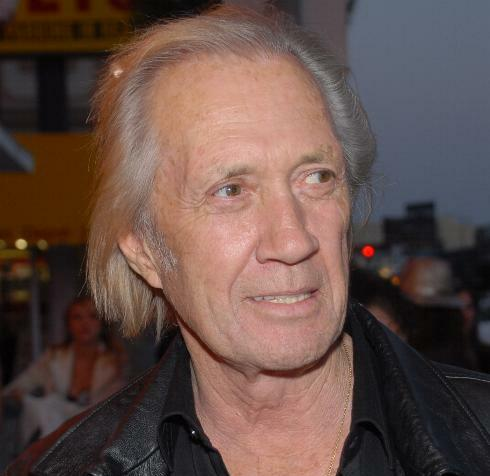
Uma Thurman and David Carradine
- Uma Thurman as the Bride / Beatrix Kiddo (Black Mamba): A former member of the Deadly Viper Assassination Squad who is described as "the deadliest woman in the world". She is targeted by her former allies in the wedding chapel massacre, and falls into a coma. When she awakens four years later, she embarks on a deadly trail of revenge against the perpetrators of the massacre.
- Daryl Hannah as Elle Driver (California Mountain Snake): A former member of the Deadly Viper Assassination Squad. She is the fourth of Beatrix's revenge targets. Elle is based on Madeleine (Christina Lindberg) in They Call Her One Eye.
- David Carradine as Bill (Snake Charmer): The former leader of the Deadly Viper Assassination Squad. He is also the former lover of Beatrix and the father of her daughter. He is the final target of Beatrix's revenge.
- Michael Madsen as Budd (Sidewinder): A former member of the Deadly Viper Assassination Squad and brother of Bill. He later becomes a bouncer living in a trailer. He is the third of Beatrix's revenge targets.
- Gordon Liu as Pai Mei: An immensely powerful and extremely old martial arts master. Beatrix, Bill, and Elle all train under him. Liu also appeared in Kill Bill: Volume 1 as Johnny Mo, leader of the Yakuza gang The Crazy 88's.
- Michael Parks as Esteban Vellajo: A retired pimp. He was the first of Bill's "father figures". Beatrix comes to him asking for Bill's whereabouts. Like Gordon Liu, Parks appeared in the first film as a different character, Texas Ranger Earl McGraw.
- Stephanie L. Moore, Shana Stein, and Caitlin Keats as Joleen, Erica, and Janeen: Beatrix's best friends who are present at the wedding rehearsal.
- Bo Svenson as Reverend Harmony: The minister who was to officiate at Beatrix and Tommy's wedding.
- Jeannie Epper as Mrs. Harmony: Reverend Harmony's wife.
- Chris Nelson as Tommy Plympton: Beatrix's fiancé who is killed in the wedding chapel massacre.
- Samuel L. Jackson as Rufus: The organist who was to perform at Beatrix and Tommy's wedding.
- Larry Bishop as Larry Gomez: The abusive manager of the strip club at which Budd works.
- Sid Haig as Jay: An employee at the strip club where Budd works.
- Laura Cayouette as Rocket: A stripper who works at the strip club where Budd works.
- Clark Middleton as Ernie: A friend of Budd’s who helps him bury Beatrix alive.
- Perla Haney-Jardine as B. B.: The daughter of Beatrix and Bill. She is raised by her father while her mother is comatose.
- Lawrence Bender as Hotel Worker (Uncredited cameo)
- Helen Kim as Karen Kim: An assassin sent to kill Beatrix, ultimately sparing her, after Beatrix informs her that she is pregnant.
- Lucy Liu as O-Ren Ishii (Cottonmouth): A former member of the Deadly Viper Assassination Squad. She later becomes "Queen of the Tokyo Underworld". She is the first of Beatrix's revenge targets.
- Vivica A. Fox as Vernita Green (Copperhead): A former member of the Deadly Viper Assassination Squad. She later becomes a homemaker living under the false name Jeannie Bell (an homage to one of the first black Playboy Playmates of the same name). She is the second of Beatrix's revenge targets.
- Julie Dreyfus as Sofie Fatale: O-Ren's lawyer, best friend, and second lieutenant. She is also a former protégé of Bill's, and was present at the wedding chapel massacre.
- Sonny Chiba as Hattori Hanzo: Revered as the greatest swordsmith of all time. Although long retired, he agrees to craft a sword for Beatrix.

== Production ==
The Kill Bill films were inspired by exploitation films that played in cheap US theaters in the 1970s, including martial arts films, samurai cinema, blaxploitation films and spaghetti westerns. Kill Bill Volume 1 and Volume 2 were planned and produced as a single film. After editing began, the executive producer, Harvey Weinstein, who was known for pressuring filmmakers to shorten their films, suggested that Quentin Tarantino split the film in two. The decision was announced in July 2003.

Tarantino said he saved most of the Bride's character development for the second film: "As far as the first half is concerned, I didn't want to make her sympathetic. I wanted to make her scary." He said he "loves" the Bride and that he "killed himself to put her in a good place" for the ending.

=== Music ===
The Kill Bill: Volume 2 soundtrack includes tracks by Shivaree, Ennio Morricone, Malcolm McLaren, Charlie Feathers, Meiko Kaji and Luis Bacalov. The original score was composed by the filmmaker Robert Rodriguez and the producer RZA.

== Release ==
=== Theatrical release ===
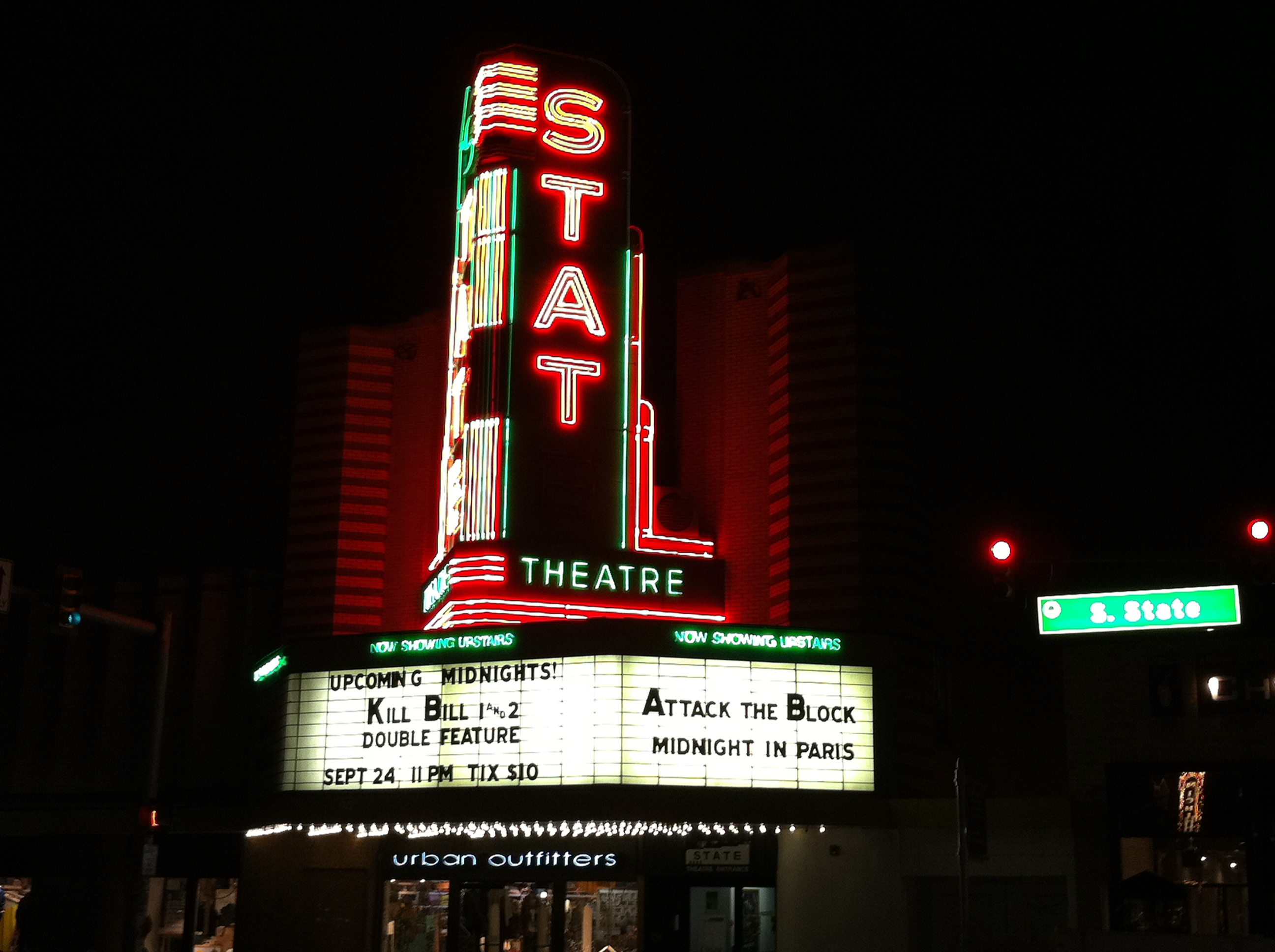
The State Theatre (Ann Arbor, Michigan) shows a double feature of Kill Bill Volume 1 and Volume 2.

Kill Bill: Volume 2 was released in theaters on April 16, 2004. It was originally scheduled to be released on February 20, 2004, but was rescheduled. Variety posited that the delay was to coincide its theatrical release with Volume 1's release on DVD. In the United States and Canada, Volume 2 was released in 2,971 theaters and grossed $25.1 million on its opening weekend, ranking first at the box office and beating fellow opener The Punisher. Volume 2's opening weekend gross was higher than Volume 1's, and the equivalent success confirmed the studio's financial decision to split the film into two theatrical releases.

Volume 2 attracted more female theatergoers than Volume 1, with 60% of the audience being male and 56% of the audience being men between the ages of 18 and 29 years old. Volume 2's opening weekend was the largest to date for Miramax Films aside from releases under its arm Dimension Films. The opening weekend was also the largest to date in the month of April for a film restricted in the United States to theatergoers 17 years old and up, besting Life's 1999 record. Volume 2's opening weekend was strengthened by the reception of Volume 1 in the previous year among audiences and critics, abundant publicity related to the splitting into two volumes, and the DVD release of Volume 1 in the week before Volume 2's theatrical release.

Outside of the United States and Canada, Volume 2 was released in 20 territories over the weekend of April 23, 2004. It grossed an estimated $17.7 million and ranked first at the international box office, ending an eight-week streak held by The Passion of the Christ. Volume 2 grossed a total of $66.2 million in the United States and Canada and $86 million in other territories for a worldwide total of $152.2 million.

=== Home media ===
In the United States, Volume 2 was released on DVD and VHS on August 10, 2004. In a December 2005 interview, Tarantino addressed the lack of a special edition DVD for Kill Bill by stating "I've been holding off because I've been working on it for so long that I just wanted a year off from Kill Bill and then I'll do the big supplementary DVD package." The United States does not have a DVD boxed set of Kill Bill, though box sets of the two separate volumes are available in other countries, such as France, Japan and the United Kingdom. Upon the DVD release of Volume 2 in the US, however, Best Buy did offer an exclusive box set slipcase to house the two individual releases together.

=== The Whole Bloody Affair ===
Kill Bill: The Whole Bloody Affair premiered at the Cannes Film Festival on May 23, 2004. At the 2008 Provincetown International Film Festival, Tarantino announced that the original cut of Kill Bill, incorporating both films and an extended animation sequence, would be released in May 2009. Screenings began on March 27, 2011, at Tarantino's New Beverly Cinema. The Whole Bloody Affair had a limited theatrical release from July 18 to July 28, 2025, at Tarantino's Vista Theater. Tarantino said he had waited until he owned the rights before giving it a full release, and thought that asking audiences to come to his theater gave it more meaning. The Whole Bloody Affair was theatrically released by Lionsgate in the United States, Canada and the United Kingdom on December 5, 2025. It was accompanied by a short animation by Tarantino and Epic Games in the video game Fortnite, in collaboration with The Third Floor, titled The Lost Chapter: Yuki's Revenge.

== Reception ==
On review aggregator Rotten Tomatoes, Kill Bill: Volume 2 holds an approval rating of 84% based on 247 reviews. The website's critical consensus states, "Kill Bill: Volume 2 adds extra plot and dialogue to the action-heavy exploits of its predecessor, while still managing to deliver a suitably hard-hitting sequel." At Metacritic, which assigns a weighted average score to reviews from mainstream critics, the film received an average score of 83 out of 100 based on 41 reviews, indicating "universal acclaim". Audiences polled by CinemaScore gave the film an average grade of "A−" on an A+ to F scale, a grade up from the "B+" earned by the previous film.

Roger Ebert gave the film 4 stars out of 4, writing: "Put the two parts together, and Tarantino has made a masterful saga that celebrates the martial arts genre while kidding it, loving it, and transcending it. ... This is all one film, and now that we see it whole, it's greater than its two parts." In 2009, he named Kill Bill one of the 20 best films of the decade.

=== Accolades ===
Thurman received a Golden Globe Best Actress in a Motion Picture - Drama nomination in 2005. Carradine also received a Best Supporting Actor nomination. Empire named Kill Bill: Volume 2 the 423rd-greatest film and the Bride the 66th-greatest film character. In 2025, it was one of the films voted for the "Readers' Choice" edition of The New York Times' list of "The 100 Best Movies of the 21st Century", finishing at number 245.

Awards
Award	Category	Recipient(s)	Outcome
10th Empire Awards
10th Empire Awards	Best Film	Kill Bill: Volume 2	Nominated
10th Empire Awards	Best Actress	Uma Thurman	Nominated
10th Empire Awards	Best Director	Quentin Tarantino	Nominated
10th Empire Awards	Sony Ericsson Scene of the Year	"The Bride" versus "Elle" sequence	Nominated
62nd Golden Globe Awards	Best Actress – Drama	Uma Thurman	Nominated
62nd Golden Globe Awards	Best Supporting Actor	David Carradine	Nominated
2005 MTV Movie Awards	Best Movie	Kill Bill: Volume 2	Nominated
2005 MTV Movie Awards	Best Female Performance	Uma Thurman	Nominated
2005 MTV Movie Awards	Best Fight	Uma Thurman vs. Daryl Hannah	Won
2004 Satellite Awards
2004 Satellite Awards	Best Film-Drama	Kill Bill: Volume 2	Nominated
2004 Satellite Awards	Best Actress - Motion Picture Drama	Uma Thurman	Nominated
2004 Satellite Awards	Best Supporting Actor – Drama	David Carradine	Nominated
2004 Satellite Awards	Best Supporting Actress – Drama	Daryl Hannah	Nominated
31st Saturn Awards
31st Saturn Awards	Best Action/Adventure Film	Kill Bill: Volume 2	Won
31st Saturn Awards	Best Actress	Uma Thurman	Nominated
31st Saturn Awards	Best Supporting Actor	David Carradine	Won
31st Saturn Awards	Best Supporting Actress	Daryl Hannah	Won
31st Saturn Awards	Best Younger Actor/Actress	Perla Haney-Jardine	Nominated
31st Saturn Awards	Best Director	Quentin Tarantino	Nominated
31st Saturn Awards	Best Screenplay	Quentin Tarantino	Nominated

== Cancelled sequels ==
In April 2004, Tarantino told Entertainment Weekly that he intended to make a Kill Bill sequel at least 15 years after the second film. He planned that the character of Nikki would seek revenge on the Bride for killing her mother, Vernita Green, in Volume 1. At the 2006 San Diego Comic-Con, Tarantino said that, after the completion of Grindhouse, he wanted to make two anime Kill Bill films: an origin story about Bill and his mentors, and another origin starring the Bride. In 2007, Bloody Disgusting reported that Volume 3 would involve two killers attacked by the Bride in the first films, and that Volume 4 "concerns a cycle of reprisals and daughters who avenge their mother's deaths". At the 2009 Morelia International Film Festival, Tarantino reiterated that he intended to make a third Kill Bill film. That month, he said that Kill Bill 3 would be his ninth film and would be released in 2014. He said he wanted 10 years to pass to give her and the Bride and her daughter a period of peace.

In December 2012, Tarantino said there would "probably not" be a third film." However, in July 2019, he said that he and Thurman had talked again about a sequel and that "if any of my movies were going to spring from my other movies, it would be a third Kill Bill". That December, Tarantino said he had spoken to Thurman again about the film, and was "definitely in the cards". In June 2021, Tarantino said he was excited about the possibility of Thurman and her daughter, Maya Hawke, playing the Bride and B.B. He also said the characters of Driver, Sofie Fatale and Gogo's twin sister, Shiaki, could appear. Later that month, Tarantino said he did not want to take on more Kill Bill films following the fatigue he endured making the first two. In July 2023, Tarantino said a sequel would not be made.

== See also ==
- Kill Buljo – 2007 Norwegian comedy film
- Lady Snowblood – 1973 Japanese jidaigeki film
- List of works by Quentin Tarantino
- Zoë Bell – New Zealand actress and stunt woman (born 1978)
