= Rock Monster =

2008 made-for-television film

- Written by: Berkeley Anderson; Ron Fernandez; Declan O'Brien
- Directed by: Declan O'Brien
- Starring: Chad Michael Collins; Jon Polito
- Theme music composer: Tom Hiel
- Country of origin: United States
- Original language: English

Production
- Producers: Jeffery Beach; Phillip J. Roth
- Cinematography: Anton Bakarski
- Editor: Matt Michael
- Running time: 86 minutes

Original release
- Network: Syfy Channel
- Release: March 22, 2008

Rock Monster is a 2008 American made-for-television film directed by Declan O'Brien. A Syfy Channel original film, it premiered on March 22, 2008.

== Plot ==
A group of traveling college students arrive at an Eastern European small village called Ivanovo after their bus broke down. One of the students, Jason, pulls a sword from a stone, unwittingly reviving a giant monster whose body is composed of rock. The monster goes on a killing spree, regenerating and blending in with mountain and stony hill features. Later at night, the one of his friends, Warren, having an injured ankle, goes missing alone in the woods and gets killed by the Rock Monster. Jason learns that an ancestor of his, Knight Jakivar Lazar, had slain a similar monster, as the evil Wizard Elas's spirit was imprisoned of the earth and stones from 800 years ago before their time, using the same sword.

Jason attempts to call the police for help in finding Warren at Cassandra's father's office, but the phone line is cut off by criminal gypsies. On the way to another town to make a phone call, Jason and his friends see the gypsies laying dead on the road. The Rock Monster reforms and reveals itself before rising to attack them. They escape back to the village before the car explodes. Surrounded by an angry mob, Toni defends Jason by telling everyone that he is sorry for everything. During a meeting in the town city hall, the Colonel gives a speech to the villagers that inspires them to fight back against the monster together. The Colonel tells Jason that his sword is actually a powerful weapon capable of killing the monster when the latter doubts its powers.

Eventually, Jason decides to stay to help them destroy the monster. Toni reveals to him that she truly likes him, leaving for Jason to say goodbye to Benny, and that he will not leave Cassandra and Toni to fight the monster alone. Back on the main road, they learn that the monster grows stronger after feeding on the blood of its victims, and that Dimitar has been using black magic from Elas's spell books. Jason's friend, Benny, is killed by the monster while walking alone in an attempt to go home. The rock monster approaches the villagers in the woods as they begin to fire at it. It starts to go after Jason, but Toni distracts the monster using a bomb launcher so that Jason can kill it. Eventually, Jason defeats the rock monster by stabbing it in the ankle, and it shatters into pieces on the ground.

At night, back in the village, at the pub restaurant, the mayor and the villagers are celebrating Jason's triumph against the monster. Jason explains to everyone how he defeated the monster, then goes outside where he and Cassandra share a kiss. Drinking with the Colonel and the mayor, Jason confesses that he loves his daughter, leading for him to ask the mayor for her hand in marriage. Dimitar tries to kill Jason with the sword at his great-aunt Sophie's cottage while sleeping, but Toni and her farm boy lover, Johan have come to save him by knocking Dimitar unconscious.

In the jail cell bound with shackles on his hands and ankles, Dimitar tells Jason that he cannot kill the monster without a red jewel keystone. Jason punches him and leaves while Dimitar laughs with a red jewel keystone around in his neck. The next morning, in her father's office, Jason asks Cassandra to come back to America with him. Later, Jason looks at his ancestor with the sword and keystone on the ground in a portrait hanging on a wall before packing their belongings. Jason and Toni hear gunshots firing, and see Cassandra holding her dead father in her arms. The Colonel tells Jason that the monster came back to open the jail cell and free Dimitar. Jason realizes that Dimitar was telling the truth the whole time, warning that the monster will return to kill everyone until Jason dies, and he inherits the sword. As the rock monster returns to the village, Toni and the Colonel use a tank to fire at it. After another attempt, both Jason and the monster are buried beneath rocks in the mountain. Cassandra, Toni, and the Colonel decide to go back the village sadly after Jason's supposed death, and the male barkeeper becomes the new mayor. The Colonel mentions that they have run out of shells for the tank, there is no army, and they need to contact the other villages. Without any other choices, the new mayor makes a deal with Dimitar for peace. Cassandra refuses to accept this bad idea because Dimitar will enslave the village and offer the villagers to the monster either way. Meanwhile, Dimitar summons the monster to get Jason out of the rocks.

Later at night, Jason, unconscious but still alive from the rocks, is brought to a secret lair in a mountain cave. Dimitar takes the sword and adds the red jewel keystone. He reveals that he has decided not to kill him yet and that the monster's soul will be freed from its stone prison and transferred into him to make him into a powerful sorcerer. Dimitar tells him that he is the last descendant of the Lazar family to witness for Elas's evil soul of his new ultimate abilities and immortality. Leaving Jason behind at his lair as he is getting away, he returns to the village with an injured leg. The new mayor, with two men, makes a deal with Dimitar to have peace. Dimitar debates on either sparing the village and the people, or killing them. Cassandra is kidnapped, knocked out, and carried away from her father's house by the new mayor, revealing him to be a traitor. He ties her up and leaves her alone in the woods. Jason angrily asks where Cassandra is and punches him, before discovering that Cassandra's has been carried away into Dimitar's lair. Toni tells Jason that if Dimitar wants an audience to see him at the sunrise tomorrow. Cassandra refuses Dimitar's proposal.

Then, the monster follows Dimitar to the village with Cassandra, to begin the soul transference. In the midst of the process, Jason reacquires the sword and kills Dimitar with it. With the sword having little effect on the creature in combat, Jason, remembering the painting depicting his ancestor impaling the ground, does the same thing and opens the ground under the monster and later stabs it in the chest; defeating the creature and sending both it and Dimitar to Hell.

Jason departs the village along with Cassandra while Toni stays behind with Johan, who proposed to Toni earlier, which she accepted.

== Cast ==
- Chad Michael Collins as Jason
- Natalie Denise Sperl as Cassandra
- Alicia Lagano as Toni
- David Figlioli as Dimitar
- Jon Polito as The Colonel
- Harry Anichkin as Mayor
- Michael Flemming as Benny
- Daniel Hembling as Warren
- Niki Iliev as Farm Boy
- Vladimir Kolev as The Barkeeper
- Philip Avramov as The Bus Driver
