= Gunfight at Rio Bravo =

2023 Western film

- Directed by: Joe Cornet
- Written by: Craig Hamann
- Starring: Alexander Nevsky; Olivier Gruner
- Release date: January 17, 2023
- Running time: 80 minutes
- Language: English

Gunfight at Rio Bravo is an American action Western film directed by Joe Cornet, from a screenplay by Craig Hamann. The film was released in 2023.

== Plot ==
The story revolves around Russian immigrant, Ivan Turchin, set a few years after the Civil War in East Texas. After a Marshall captures infamous outlaw Colonel Crawley, they protect the town of Rio Bravo from the Bloodhounds, his gang who are trying to break him out of prison. Ivan, the sheriff, and the Marshall must stop the bloodhounds before it is too late. Gunfight at Rio Bravo features legendary gunslinger, Ivan Turchin.

== Main cast ==
- Alexander Nevsky as Ivan Turchin
- Olivier Gruner as Marshall Austin Carter
- Joe Cornet as Sheriff Vernon Kelly
- Matthias Hues as Ethan Crawley
- Natalie Denise Sperl as Nora Miller
- Kerry Goodwin as Jenny Gray
- John Marrs as Grady

== Production ==
The film was directed by Joe Cornet and written by Craig Hamann.

== Release ==
In November 2022, Shout! Studios acquired the film from Premiere Entertainment. The film was announced for a limited film release on January 13, 2023, with a digital release shortly after on January 17.

== Sequels ==
The first sequel Taken from Rio Bravo was released in 2024. A third film, The Last Heroes of Rio Bravo, began development in 2023.
