= Parks v. LaFace Records =

1999 American lawsuit

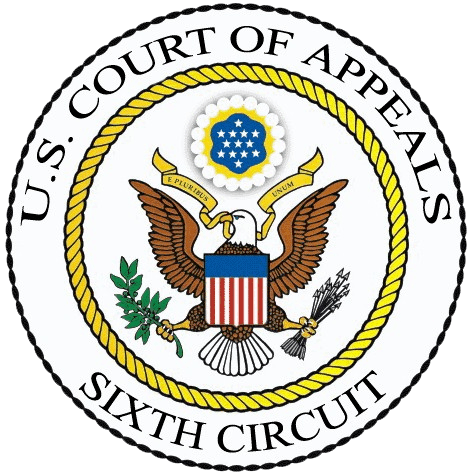
- Court: United States Court of Appeals for the Sixth Circuit
- Full case name: Rosa Parks v. LaFace Records, et al.
- Argued: May 4, 2001
- Decided: May 12, 2003
- Citations: 329 F.3d 437; 66 U.S.P.Q.2d 1735

Case history
- Prior history: Summary judgment granted, 76 F. Supp. 2d 775 (E.D. Mich. 1999).
- Subsequent history: Petition for rehearing en banc denied, July 2, 2003; cert. denied, 540 U.S. 1074 (2003).

Court membership
- Judges sitting: Alan Eugene Norris, R. Guy Cole Jr., John D. Holschuh

Case opinions
- Majority: Holschuh, joined by unanimous

Parks v. LaFace Records, 329 F.3d 437 (6th Cir. 2003), was a lawsuit filed by attorney Gregory J Reed in March 1999 on Rosa Parks' behalf against American hip-hop duo Outkast and LaFace Records, claiming that the group had illegally used Parks' name without her permission for the song "Rosa Parks", the most successful radio single of Outkast's 1998 album Aquemini. The song's chorus, which Parks' legal defense felt was disrespectful to her, is as follows: "Ah ha, hush that fuss / Everybody move to the back of the bus / Do you want to bump and slump with us / We the type of people make the club get crunk."

The case was dismissed in November 1999 by U.S. District Court Judge Barbara Kloka Hackett. In August 2000, Parks' attorney Reed hired attorney Johnnie Cochran to help her appeal the district court's decision. Cochran argued that the song did not have First Amendment protection because, although its title carried Parks' name, its lyrics were not about her. However, Judge Hackett upheld Outkast's right to use Parks' name in November 1999, and Parks took the case to the United States Court of Appeals for the Sixth Circuit, where some charges were remanded for further trial.

Parks' attorneys Reed, refiled in August 2004, and named BMG, Arista Records and LaFace Records as the defendants, asking for $5 million in damages. (Also named as defendants were several parties not directly connected to the songs, including Barnes & Noble and Borders for selling the songs, and Gregory Dark and Braddon Mendelson, the director and producer, respectively, of the 1998 music video. The judge dismissed the music video producers from the case by the reason of "fraudulent joinder", as these defendants had no connection to the case and there was no justifiable reason for the plaintiff's attorneys to add them to the lawsuit.)

In October 2004, U.S. District Judge George Caram Steeh appointed Dennis Archer, a former mayor of Detroit and Michigan Supreme Court justice, as guardian of legal matters for Parks after her family expressed concerns that her caretakers and her lawyer were pursuing the case based on their own financial interests. "My auntie would never, ever go to this length to hurt some young artists trying to make it in the world," Parks' niece Rhea McCauley said in an Associated Press interview. "As a family, our fear is that during her last days Auntie Rosa will be surrounded by strangers trying to make money off of her name."

The lawsuit was settled April 15, 2005. In the settlement agreement, Outkast and their producer and recorded labels paid Parks an undisclosed cash settlement and agreed to work with the Rosa and Raymond Parks Institute for Self Development in creating educational programs about the life of Rosa Parks. The record labels and Outkast admitted to no wrongdoing. It is not known whether Parks' legal fees were paid for from her settlement money or by the record companies.
