= The Bride (Kill Bill) =

Film character

Beatrix Kiddo The Bride
- Kill Bill character
- The Bride in Kill Bill: Volume 1
- First appearance: Kill Bill: Volume 1 (2003)
- Last appearance: The Lost Chapter: Yuki's Revenge (2025)
- Created by: Quentin Tarantino; Uma Thurman
- Portrayed by: Uma Thurman
- Voiced by: Uma Thurman (The Lost Chapter: Yuki's Revenge)

In-universe information
- Full name: Beatrix Kiddo
- Aliases: Black Mamba; Arlene Machiavelli; The Bride; Mommy
- Gender: Female
- Occupation: Assassin
- Children: B.B. (daughter)
- Nationality: American

Beatrix "the Bride" Kiddo (codename: Black Mamba) is the protagonist of the martial arts films Kill Bill: Volume 1 (2003), Kill Bill: Volume 2 (2004), and Kill Bill: The Whole Bloody Affair (2004) directed by Quentin Tarantino. She is portrayed by Uma Thurman. In 2010, Entertainment Weekly named the Bride the 99th-greatest character of the preceding 20 years, and in 2015 Empire named her the 23rd-greatest film character of all time.

== Kill Bill ==
Beatrix "the Bride" Kiddo, codenamed Black Mamba, is the protagonist of the martial arts films Kill Bill: Volume 1 (2003) and Kill Bill: Volume 2 (2004), directed by Quentin Tarantino. She is portrayed by Uma Thurman. Her name is not revealed until Volume 2.

The Bride was once a member of the Deadly Viper Assassination Squad, an elite group of assassins. She is trained by the martial arts master Pai Mei and becomes the right hand of Bill, her boss and lover, provoking the envy of another Deadly Viper, Elle Driver. When the Bride discovers she is pregnant with Bill's child, she abandons the Deadly Vipers so her baby can have a better life, and becomes engaged. Bill, assuming her fiancé is the father, orders them assassinated at the chapel and shoots her in the head.

The Bride survives and falls into a coma. Bill aborts an order to have her assassinated in the hospital, considering it dishonorable when she cannot defend herself. The Bride awakens from the coma years later and is horrified to find that she is no longer pregnant. She tracks down the Deadly Vipers, including O-Ren Ishii, now the leader of the Tokyo yakuza, and exacts revenge under the assumption that her child died during her coma. In Mexico, the Bride tracks Bill to a hotel and discovers that their daughter B.B. is still alive, now four years old. The Bride kills Bill using the five-point-palm exploding heart technique, taught to her by Pai Mei, though she reconciles with him in his final moments. Beatrix leaves with B.B. to start a new life.

== Writing ==
According to Thurman, she and Tarantino created the Bride during the filming of Tarantino's 1994 film Pulp Fiction, in which she starred. Thurman provided the Bride's first name and Tarantino her last name.

Tarantino developed many of the Bride's characteristics for the character of Shosanna Dreyfus for his 2009 film Inglourious Basterds, which he worked on before Kill Bill. Originally, Dreyfus would be an assassin with a list of Nazis she would cross off as she killed. Tarantino later switched the character to the Bride and redeveloped Dreyfus.

Tarantino said he saved most of the Bride's character development for the second film: "As far as the first half is concerned, I didn't want to make her sympathetic. I wanted to make her scary." Thurman cited Clint Eastwood's performance as Blondie in the 1966 film The Good, the Bad and the Ugly, as an inspiration; in her words, Eastwood "says almost nothing but somehow manages to portray a whole character". Tarantino said that he "loves" the Bride and that he "killed himself to put her in a good place" for the ending.

== Cultural influence ==
In 2010, Entertainment Weekly named the Bride the 99th-greatest character of the preceding 20 years, and in 2015 Empire named her the 23rd-greatest film character of all time. In 2013, researchers named a new species of parasitic wasp, Cystomastacoides kiddo, after her, saying it was inspired by "the deadly biology [of the wasp] to the host". The American basketball player Kobe Bryant adopted the Bride's codename, "Black Mamba", for himself. The American actress Evan Rachel Wood played a character inspired by the Bride and another of Thurman's characters, Mia Wallace from Pulp Fiction, in a 2019 stage musical based on Tarantino's films, Fox Force Five and the Tyranny of Evil Men. The character was later portrayed by Lindsey Gort in a 2021 production.

When a video file with Kill Bill in the title finishes on VLC media player, the app's orange traffic-cone logo turns yellow with black stripes and a blood stain on the base, alluding to the Bride's iconic outfit.

== Analysis ==
The essay "Visual Representations of Violent Women", by the academics Yuko Minowa, Pauline Maclaran and Lorna Stevens, argues that the Bride displays both masculine and feminine elements, which the authors feel is gender-subversive. The authors compared the Bride to the painting Judith with the Head of Holofernes by Lucas Cranach the Elder, and wrote that Kiddo "represents defamiliarization and affirmation of women's entitlement to violence through the visualization of excessive vengeance".

The academic Erin Harrington identified the Bride as an example of "monstrous motherhood" and a protective "Mama Bear", noting that her actions in the second film are motivated by the discovery that her daughter is alive. The reveal of the Bride's name in the second film assists her transition from "thwarted bride to wronged mother" or an agent of vengeance to a protective mother, before settling on a more docile, maternal role once the danger has passed and her goals are achieved.

== See also ==
- List of female action heroes and villains
- Lady Snowblood – 1973 film, and its character Yuki
- Kill Buljo – 2007 parody of Kill Bill and its main character, Jompa Tormann
