= Craig Hamann =

American filmmaker

- Born: Craig Hamann
- Occupations: Film director; Screenwriter; Producer; Actor
- Years active: 1986−present

Craig Hamann is an American film director, screenwriter, producer and actor. He is best known for his work on Quentin Tarantino's film My Best Friend's Birthday (1987).

== Career ==
Craig Hamann first appeared in Fred Olen Ray's horror film The Tomb (1986). While at the James Best Theatre Company, Hamann met Quentin Tarantino, with whom he would write the shot-on-video zombie film Warzone. He would reteam with Tarantino to write the comedy film My Best Friend's Birthday (1987). Hamann and Tarantino would also co-star in the film. Hamann, along with Tarantino, considered the production and low budget nature of Spike Lee's film She's Gotta Have It (1986) as a major influence in making My Best Friend's Birthday. He would write the screenplay for Charles Band's Dollman vs. Demonic Toys (1993). In 1994, he would write the horror film Stalked, before serving as a drug consultant on Tarantino's Pulp Fiction (1994).

In 1998, he would make his directorial debut with the crime film Boogie Boy. He would reteam with Band on the latter's film The Haunted Dollhouse (2013). In 2015, he wrote the screenplay for the Russian film Showdown in Manila (2016). By February 2020, he was developing Smokers, a 10-episode television series. He wrote the western films Gunfight at Rio Bravo (2023), and its sequels Taken from Rio Bravo (2024) and The Last Heroes of Rio Bravo (TBA). He would also script Night of the Caregiver (2023) and The Wide West (2025). In 2023, he wrote the screenplay for the upcoming horror film The Ominous (TBA).

== Filmography ==
Year	Title	Director	Screenwriter	Producer	Actor	Other	Notes/Ref(s)
1986	The Tomb	No	No	No	Yes	No	Role: Tyler
1987	My Best Friend's Birthday	No	Yes	Yes	Yes	No	Role: Mickey Burnett
1992	Reservoir Dogs	No	No	No	Yes	No	Role: Background Radio Play (voice)
1992	Murder, She Wrote	No	No	No	Yes	No	Role: Bert Lazarus; Episode: "A Christmas Secret"
1993	Dollman vs. Demonic Toys	No	Yes	No	No	No	
1994	Pulp Fiction	No	No	No	No	Yes	Consultant
1994	Scanner Cop	No	No	No	Yes	No	Role: Officer Gorman
1994	Stalked	No	Yes	No	No	No	
1998	Boogie Boy	Yes	Yes	No	No	No	
2013	The Haunted Dollhouse	No	Yes	No	No	No	
2016	Showdown in Manila	No	Yes	No	No	No	
2023	Gunfight at Rio Bravo	No	Yes	No	No	No	
2023	Night of the Caregiver	No	Yes	Co-producer	No	No	
2024	Taken from Rio Bravo	No	Yes	No	No	No	
2025	The Wide West	No	Yes	No	No	No	
