= New Beverly Cinema =

Movie theater in Los Angeles

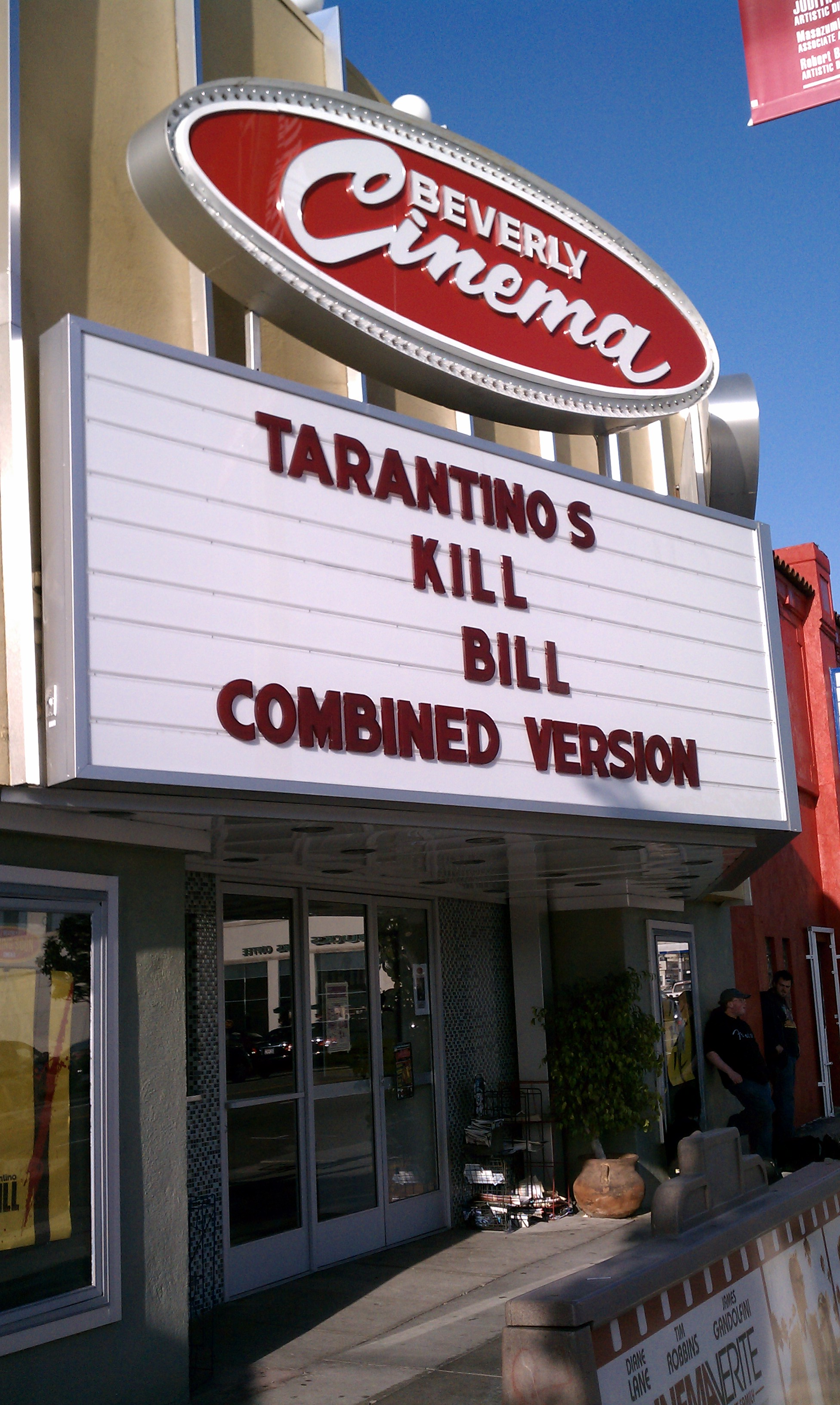
- Kill Bill: The Whole Bloody Affair at the New Beverly in 2011
- Interactive map of New Beverly Cinema
- Address: 7165 Beverly Boulevard
- Location: Los Angeles, California 90036; United States
- Coordinates: 34°4′34.42″N 118°20′44.73″W
- Owner: Quentin Tarantino
- Capacity: 228
- Type: Movie theater

Construction
- Built: 1920s
- Opened: 1929
- Renovated: 1978, 2018

Website
- www.thenewbev.com

The New Beverly Cinema is a historic movie theater located in Los Angeles, California. Housed in a building that dates back to the 1920s, it is one of the oldest revival houses in the region. Since 2007, it has been owned by filmmaker Quentin Tarantino.

== History ==
The 300-seat New Beverly Cinema was designed by the architects John P. Edwards and Warren Frazier Overpeck and opened in 1929, apparently as a candy store. Over the years, its name and purpose has changed several times.

As a theater, it has hosted variety performers such as Dean Martin, Jerry Lewis, Jackie Gleason, Phil Silvers, and others. Later, the theater was converted into a nightclub called Slapsy Maxie's, named after the boxer and film actor Maxie Rosenbloom.

In the late 1950s, the space was converted into a movie theater which would come to see several different changes in both repertoire and name, including the New Yorker Theater, the Europa (specializing in foreign films), the Eros (pornographic films, from 1970 to 1977), and finally the Beverly Cinema.

=== Sherman Torgan ownership ===
The Eros closed in September 1977 and changed management months later. On May 5, 1978, the New Beverly Cinema debuted a new programming format with a double feature of A Streetcar Named Desire and Last Tango in Paris. This double-feature format continues to this day.

The theater's new owner, Sherman Torgan, said: "I've always felt that this neighborhood, which is middle class and predominantly Jewish, should have a theater that is responsive to the community. It wasn't right that a porno theater was here. People in the area have come by and written letters offering congratulations on the changeover."

Since that time, the theater has run a continuous series of double features, comprising modern and classic films in a wide variety of genres. It is the last continuous repertory revival house in Los Angeles. Most other American cities and towns closed their last remaining repertory cinemas in the 1980s and 1990s.

Torgan did all of the programming for the theater throughout these years, with the assistance of his son, Michael. In 2002, the theater became the permanent venue of the Grindhouse Film Festival, a monthly event programmed by film memorabilia vendors and cult film experts Eric Caidin and Brian J. Quinn. In March 2007, the filmmaker Quentin Tarantino curated a month of double and triple bills from his personal collection to promote the release of his film Grindhouse.

On July 18, 2007, Sherman Torgan died of a heart attack at age 63 while bicycling in Santa Monica.

=== Quentin Tarantino ownership ===
In December 2007, to save the property from redevelopment, Tarantino purchased it, effectively making him the theater's landlord. The Hollywood Reporter reported that Tarantino would allow the Torgan family to continue operating the theater but would make programming suggestions from time to time. Tarantino said: "As long as I'm alive, and as long as I'm rich, the New Beverly will be there, showing double features in 35mm."

From December 2007 until September 2014, the New Beverly was managed full-time by Michael Torgan. Tarantino facilitated Torgan's renovation of the theater, which included replacing all the lighting fixtures and seats, while Torgan funded the installation of a digital film projector for occasional use.

In September 2014, seven years after acquiring the theater, Tarantino took over full programming duties for the New Beverly. The cinema would continue to show double features, now exclusively in 35mm (or 16mm, depending on print availability), with some films coming from Tarantino's private collection. In October, Tarantino's new programming began with a double feature of Paul Mazursky films: Bob & Carol & Ted & Alice (1969) and Blume in Love (1973).

The theater's standard programming was suspended for extended runs of Tarantino's films Django Unchained (2012), The Hateful Eight (2016), and Once Upon a Time in Hollywood (2019). For Once Upon a Time in Hollywood, the theater was adorned with film posters (both real and fictional), lobby cards and props used in the film, and the screenings featured a specially curated pre-show consisting of an extended cut of the Bounty Law segment and vintage trailers that are featured (C.C. and Company and The Wrecking Crew) or referenced (Rosemary's Baby) in the film. The final first-run screening took place on February 29, 2020.

In 2018, the New Beverly was closed for renovations from January 1 through December 1. On March 16, 2020, the theater closed, following an order from Los Angeles mayor Eric Garcetti that all L.A. movie theaters must temporarily cease operations, due to the COVID-19 pandemic. On May 1, 2021, the New Beverly announced that they would be reopening on June 1. The theater reopened with a sold out screening of Once Upon a Time in Hollywood, although its seating capacity was temporary limited to half. The theater had also implemented several safety upgrades, including ultraviolet air purification and increased MERV air filtration, and introduced marked seating to aid with social distancing.

In February 2026, the New Beverly honored the theater's tenure as the Eros in the 1970s by programming an entire month of erotic-themed films, including sexploitation and hardcore features, both famous and obscure. The series continued throughout March.

== Schedule and repertoire ==
In addition to daily double (and, occasionally, triple) features, usually beginning at 7:30 p.m., midnight screenings are programmed on Fridays and Saturdays. The Friday midnight show is a Quentin Tarantino film (which rotates each month) while Saturday midnight offerings are more eclectic. "Family Matinees" take place on weekend afternoons at 2:00 p.m., with a reduced admission price that includes a small popcorn. The "Cartoon Club", which runs at 10:00 a.m. monthly on a Saturday morning, pays tribute to cinemas' historic child-focused morning screenings with both feature-length and short-form animation. All features at the theater are usually preceded by a curated collection of vintage cartoons, shorts and trailers.

In 2017, the theater incorporated an "Afternoon Classics" series of matinees held on Wednesday afternoons, and 2019 saw the introduction of both "Monday Matinees" and horror-themed "Freaky Fridays" matinees, all of which have been discontinued. The Friday matinee series returned in 2026 with a more general focus.

== In popular culture ==
- The building's exterior (when it comprised two theaters: the Capri and the Riviera) is featured in episode 17 of The Beverly Hillbillies, "Jed's Dilemma", which originally aired on January 16, 1963.
- A poster for the New Beverly's July 1993 screening schedule is visible in the background of the fourth episode of the sitcom Saved by the Bell: The College Years.
- In the 1996 comedy Swingers, a screening schedule for the New Beverly appears prominently on the side of Mike's refrigerator.
- Comedian Patton Oswalt's 2015 memoir, Silver Screen Fiend, focuses on his obsessive patronage of the New Beverly, where he watched 720 films from 1995 to 1999, seeking "magical assistance" from classic films to guide his own career.
- In 2016, then-New Beverly employee Julia Marchese released the documentary Out of Print about the importance of 35mm film and revival cinemas, with the New Beverly as its primary focus. The documentary included interviews with directors such as Rian Johnson, John Landis, Kevin Smith, Joe Carnahan and Edgar Wright, as well as faithful patrons of the theater.
- The 2017 documentary short Videostore, filmed on 16mm, opens with a shot of Sherman Torgan replacing letters on the marquee of the New Beverly and features interviews conducted inside the theater.
- The New Beverly is indirectly referenced in Tarantino's own 2019 film Once Upon a Time in Hollywood. While entering the nearby El Coyote Cafe, Sharon Tate notices a film premiere happening down the street and asks Jay Sebring if "dirty movies" have premieres.
- In the 2019 music video for Haim's "Summer Girl", directed by Paul Thomas Anderson, the band walks past a ticket line at the New Beverly and singer Danielle Haim enters the box office.
