= My Best Friend's Birthday =

1987 short film directed by Quentin Tarantino

- Clarence (Quentin Tarantino) meets Misty (Crystal Shaw)
- Directed by: Quentin Tarantino
- Screenplay by: Craig Hamann; Quentin Tarantino
- Story by: Craig Hamann
- Produced by: Quentin Tarantino; Craig Hamann; Rand Vossler
- Starring: Quentin Tarantino; Craig Hamann; Crystal Shaw; Allen Garfield; Al Harrell; Brenda Hillhouse; Linda Kaye; Stevo Polyi; Alan Sanborn; Rich Turner; Rowland Wafford
- Cinematography: Roger Avary; Scott Magill; Roberto A. Quezada; Rand Vossler
- Edited by: Quentin Tarantino
- Distributed by: Super Happy Fun
- Release date: 1987
- Running time: 70 minutes (original version); 36 minutes (remaining version)
- Country: United States
- Language: English
- Budget: $5,000 (estimated)

My Best Friend's Birthday is an unfinished 1987 amateur comedy film directed, edited, co-written, co-produced by and starring Quentin Tarantino. The film was shot in black-and-white and was originally meant to have a runtime of seventy minutes, but only 36 minutes of the film are edited altogether, leaving the project unfinished.

== Plot ==
It's Mickey's birthday, and his girlfriend just left him. His friend Clarence shows up to give him a birthday he'll never forget.

== Cast ==
- Quentin Tarantino as Clarence Poole, a radio DJ
- Craig Hamann as Mickey Burnett, a radio DJ
- Crystal Shaw as Misty Knight, a call girl, named after the Marvel Comics character of the same name.
- Allen Garfield as Bill Smith, an entertainment magnate
- Al Harrell as Clifford, a pimp
- Brenda Hillhouse as Mrs. Smith
- Linda Kaye as Pandora
- Stevo Polyi as Clancy, a radio DJ
- Alan Sanborn as Nutmeg
- Rich Turner as Brandon Turner
- Rowland Wafford as Lenny Otis

== Production ==
The film was made while Quentin Tarantino was working at the Video Archives, now closed, in Manhattan Beach, California. The project started in 1984, when Craig Hamann wrote a short 30- to 40-page script.

Tarantino became attached to the project as co-writer and director, and he and Hamann expanded the script to 80 pages. On an estimated budget of $5,000, the film was originally planned in a Super 8mm format. However, when Tarantino was able to borrow a 16mm camera from film director Fred Olen Ray, the film was shot in 16mm over the course of the next four years. Hamann and Tarantino starred in the film, along with several video store and acting class buddies, and worked on the crew, which included fellow Video Archives employees Rand Vossler and Roger Avary. It is the most overtly comedic film that Tarantino has made. In an interview with Charlie Rose (available on the Region 1 Collector's Edition DVD of Pulp Fiction), he referred to it as a "Martin and Lewis kind of thing."

It was long alleged that the original cut was about 70 minutes long, but due to a film lab fire, only 36 minutes of the film still exist. In 2019, a book titled My Best Friend's Birthday: The Making of a Quentin Tarantino Film, written by Andrew J. Rausch, was published by BearManor Media. The book features interviews with all of the film's principal personnel, including Tarantino, Hamann, and Avary. In the book, it is revealed the fire story was fabricated, with Tarantino choosing not to dismiss it as he thought it sounded interesting. In actuality, some rolls of film were simply discarded by mistake, and Tarantino, unsatisfied with the final product, edited together the scenes he liked, leaving the project unfinished. However, he has not dismissed the possibility of restoring and completing the film one day. The surviving footage has been edited together and shown at several film festivals.

== See also ==
- List of incomplete or partially lost films
