= Mel Gorham =

American actress

- Born: Marilyn Schnier; United States
- Occupation: Actress

Mel Gorham (born Marilyn Schnier, October 27, 1959) is an American actress who is best known for her role as Violet in Wayne Wang's films Smoke and Blue in the Face. Gorham is from Miami, Florida, and is of Cuban and Jewish descent.

Gorham's improvised rendition of Peggy Lee's "Fever" in Blue in the Face garnered her much critical acclaim and press. Major film roles in Curdled and Cop Land followed. In 1997, Gorham was then cast to star in an NBC sitcom loosely based on her life titled Union Square. But after the pilot was filmed, the producers replaced her with Constance Marie.

Gorham returned to the world of New York City theater where she began. After a long absence, she returned to film with a role in Wayne Wang's 2001 film The Center of the World. In 2012, she retired from show business and currently resides in South Beach.

== Filmography ==
=== Film ===
- 1990 - Awakenings as Nurse Sara
- 1993 - Carlito's Way as Pachanga's date
- 1995 - Smoke as Violet
- 1995 - Blue in the Face as Violet
- 1995 - The Perez Family as Vilma & Raquel
- 1996 - Curdled as Elena
- 1997 - Cop Land as Monica Lopez
- 1997 - Wishful Thinking as Lourdes
- 2001 - The Center of the World as Roxanne
- 2005 - Sueno as Gloria
- 2006 - Delirious as Tish
- 2007 - Mother's Day Massacre as Dolores
- 2009 - American Cowslip as Kimberly
- 2011 - A Talent for Trouble as Francine Hawk
- 2011 - The Trouble with Cali as Xiomara

=== Television ===
Mel Gorham television credits
Year	Title	Role	Notes
1989	The Equalizer	Mother	Episode: "The Visitation"
1991	Law & Order	Woman #1	Episode: "Heaven"
2003	Arrested Development	Helen	1 episode
