= Kuroiwa =

Kuroiwa (written: 黒岩 lit. "black rock") is a Japanese surname. Notable people with the surname include:

- Akira Kuroiwa (黒岩 彰, born 1961), Japanese speed skater
- Hisami Kuroiwa, Japanese-American film producer
- Mamoru Kuroiwa (黒岩 守, born 1962), Japanese boxer
- Munehisa Kuroiwa (黒岩 宗久, born 1966), Japanese speed skater
- Kuroiwa Shūroku (黒岩 周六, 1862–1920), also known as Kuroiwa Ruikō, Japanese journalist and novelist
- Toshio Kuroiwa (黒岩 利雄, 1908–1944), Japanese naval aviator
- Toshiyuki Kuroiwa (黒岩 敏幸, born 1969), Japanese speed skater
- Yūji Kuroiwa (黒岩 祐治, born 1954), Japanese politician
- Yoshitami Kuroiwa (黒岩 義民, –2012), Japanese film editor
- Toshiki Kuroiwa (黒岩 俊喜, born 1993), Japanese bobsledder
- Yukihiko Kuroiwa (黒岩 幸彦, 1931-2011), better known as Oniroku Dan, Japanese author

== Fictional characters ==
- Geki Kuroiwa (黒岩 激), a character in the anime series Brave Command Dagwon
- Iwao Kuroiwa (黒磐 巌), a character in the manga series Tokyo Ghoul
- Takeomi Kuroiwa (黒磐 武臣), a character in the manga series Tokyo Ghoul
- Mitsuru Kuroiwa (黒岩 満), a character in the video game Judgment (video game)
