= Angela Jones =

American actress

- Born: December 23, 1968 (age 57); Greensburg, Pennsylvania, United States
- Education: Point Park University
- Occupation: Actress
- Years active: 1991–present

Angela Jones (born December 23, 1968) is an American actress.

== Early life and education ==
Jones was born in Greensburg, Pennsylvania, and then raised in Jeannette, Pennsylvania, where she graduated in 1986. She is a graduate of Point Park College in Pittsburgh.

== Career ==
While attending graduate school at the Oslo Conservatory of Performing Arts in Sarasota, Florida, Jones was cast in the short film Curdled (1991), directed by Reb Braddock. Quentin Tarantino was impressed with her performance and created the role of Esmarelda Villalobos for her in Pulp Fiction, inspired by her earlier role. Tarantino then executive produced a 1996 remake of Curdled, in which she also starred.

In rock musician Slash's 2007 biography Slash, it was mentioned that while recording the soundtrack for the film Curdled, the two had a brief relationship. Jones was the inspiration for Slash's song "Obsession Confession" that he wrote for the Curdled soundtrack, with Slash stating that he and his band were fascinated by her after seeing her in Pulp Fiction.

== Selected filmography ==
- Curdled (1991, short film) – Gabriela Ponce
- Strapped (1993) – Woman at Clinic
- Pulp Fiction (1994) – Esmarelda Villalobos
- Curdled (1996, executive producer Quentin Tarantino) – Gabriela Ponce
- Underworld (1996) – Janette
- Fatal Encounters (1997) – Monica Wilder
- Morella (1997) – Dr.Patricia Morella / Sarah Lynden
- Pariah (1998) – Angela
- Children of the Corn V: Fields of Terror (1998) – Charlotte
- Back to Even (1998) – Kim
- Man on the Moon (1999) – Hooker
- Family Secrets (2001) – Mary Drake
- House at the End of the Drive (2006) – Felicia
- Chillerama (2011) – Train Passenger
- Butt Boy (2019) – Doctor Morean
