= Hisami Kuroiwa =

Japanese-American film producer

Hisami Kuroiwa is a Japanese-American film producer.

== Career ==
Born in Japan, Hisami was educated at Meiji Gakuin University in Tokyo before moving to the United States to pursue her career. She based herself in New York City, where she has now been working in the film industry for over 25 years.

Her first big success came with Smoke in 1995, starring Harvey Keitel and Forest Whitaker. The film won the Silver Bear at the Berlin International Film Festival and introduced director Wayne Wang to the world.

In 1997 she produced Sunday, which starred Jared Harris in his first major role, and went on to take $6 million at the box office despite having a very low budget. In that same year came the cult success of Bent starring Clive Owen, adapted from the play by Martin Sherman. It won the Award of the Youth at the Cannes Film Festival.

Also in 1997, film historian Charles Musser published the book Edison Motion Pictures, 1890-1900: An Annotated Filmography, whose dedication page begins "For Hisami Kuroiwa" (unnumbered page 9).

Uncredited, Hisami has provided financing and production support for a host of other well-known directors, including Wong Kar-wai, Jim Jarmusch and Gaspar Noe. Known for widespread connections in Asia (particularly Japan and Hong Kong), Europe and North America, Hisami has been instrumental in the launching of many careers, whilst simultaneously being a major patron of the photographic arts in Japan and the USA.

She has also developed one of K-Michel Parandi's first screenplays, Nature of April.

In addition to her work in the film world, she is on the board of advisors for Kaya, a literary publisher.

== Filmography ==
- When Pigs Fly
- Blue in the Face
- Smoke
- Flirt
- Sunday
- Bent
- Kool: Dancing in my Mind
- A History of Sex
- Love God
- Miss Wonton
- 1937
