= Family Secrets (2001 film) =

2001 film by Sally Champlin

- Directed by: Sally Champlin
- Written by: Sally Champlin
- Produced by: Anne Charmillot
- Starring: Angela Jones; Edward Bunker; Pamela Bellwood; Tim Redwine
- Cinematography: Ray Preziosi
- Release date: 2001
- Running time: 78 minutes
- Country: United States

Family Secrets is a 2001 period film starring Angela Jones and written and directed by Sally Champlin.

== Overview ==
A young boy retreats into an endless cycle of sadness following his grandmother's death. His parents hire a live-in tutor in a final bid to save their son.
