= Betsy Heimann =

American costume designer

- Born: Chicago
- Occupation: Costume designer

Betsy Faith Heimann is an American costume designer best known for her collaborations with directors such as Cameron Crowe, Brett Ratner, M. Night Shyamalan, and Quentin Tarantino.

== Filmography ==
Year	Title	Director	Notes
1981	The Pee-Wee Herman Show	Marty Callner & Paul Reubens	
1983	This Girl For Hire	Jerry Jameson	Pilot for a proposed TV series
1983	High Road to China	Brian G. Hutton	
1985	The Dirty Dozen: Next Mission	Andrew V. McLaglen	
1986	Sky Bandits	Zoran Perisic	
1987	Medium Rare	Paul Madden	
1987	Surrender	Jerry Belson	
1988	Stranger on My Land	Larry Elikann	
1988	Elvira: Mistress of the Dark	James Signorelli	
1990	Tune in Tomorrow	Jon Amiel	
1990	Welcome Home, Roxy Carmichael	Jim Abrahams	
1991	One Good Cop	Heywood Gould	
1991	One Against the Wind	Larry Elikann	
1992	Reservoir Dogs	Quentin Tarantino	1st collaboration with Tarantino
1993	The Adventures of Huck Finn	Stephen Sommers	Credited as Betsy Faith Heimann
1994	Gunmen	Deran Sarafian	
1994	Pulp Fiction	Quentin Tarantino	2nd collaboration with Tarantino
1994	Renaissance Man	Penny Marshall	
1995	Get Shorty	Barry Sonnenfeld	
1995	The Tie That Binds	Wesley Strick	
1996	2 Days in the Valley	John Herzfeld	
1996	Jerry Maguire	Cameron Crowe	1st collaboration with Crowe
1997	Switchback	Jeb Stuart	
1998	Mercury Rising	Harold Becker	
1998	Out of Sight	Steven Soderbergh	
1998	Simon Birch	Mark Steven Johnson	
1999	Anywhere but Here	Wayne Wang	
2000	Almost Famous	Cameron Crowe	2nd collaboration with Crowe
2000	The Family Man	Brett Ratner	1st collaboration with Ratner
2001	Vanilla Sky	Cameron Crowe	3rd collaboration with Crowe
2002	Red Dragon	Brett Ratner	2nd collaboration with Ratner
2002	Stealing Harvard	Bruce McCulloch	
2005	Be Cool	F. Gary Gray	
2005	Man of the House	Stephen Herek	
2006	Art School Confidential	Terry Zwigoff	
2006	Lady in the Water	M. Night Shyamalan	1st collaboration with Shyamalan
2007	Rush Hour 3	Brett Ratner	3rd collaboration with Ratner
2008	The Happening	M. Night Shyamalan	2nd collaboration with Shyamalan
2009	Funny People	Judd Apatow	
2009	The Ugly Truth	Robert Luketic	
2010	The A-Team	Joe Carnahan	
2011	The Change-Up	David Dobkin	
2012	Hotel Noir	Sebastian Gutiérrez	
2013	Broken City	Allen Hughes	
2014	A Walk Among the Tombstones	Scott Frank	
2014	Wish I Was Here	Zach Braff	
2018	Green Book	Peter Farrelly	
2021	The Tomorrow War	Chris McKay	
2022	Marlowe	Neil Jordan	
2024	Heretic	Scott Beck and Bryan Woods	
2025	The Naked Gun	Akiva Schaffer	
