= Curdled (film) =

1996 film by Reb Braddock

- Theatrical release poster
- Directed by: Reb Braddock
- Written by: Reb Braddock; John Maass
- Produced by: John Maass; Raul Puig
- Starring: Angela Jones; William Baldwin; Bruce Ramsay; Mel Gorham; Lois Chiles; Daisy Fuentes; Barry Corbin
- Cinematography: Steven Bernstein
- Edited by: Mallory Gottlieb
- Music by: Joseph Julián González
- Production companies: A Band Apart; Tinderbox Films
- Distributed by: Rolling Thunder Pictures; Miramax Films
- Release date: September 27, 1996 (U.S.)
- Running time: 88 minutes
- Country: United States
- Language: English
- Budget: $2.3 million
- Box office: $49,620

Curdled is a 1996 black comedy crime film written and directed by Reb Braddock. The film stars Angela Jones as a Colombian immigrant who takes a crime scene cleanup job and discovers evidence about a local serial killer dubbed the "Blue Blood Killer" for his targeting of socialites. The film is a remake of a 1991 short film of the same name, which was also directed by Braddock and starred Jones.

== Plot ==
Gabriela is a Colombian immigrant living in Miami who has been fascinated with violent death ever since she saw a falling corpse pass by her mother's bakery window as a child. With many television shows and films feeding her obsession, she believes that after someone is decapitated, they still talk for a short while afterwards.

Having quit her job at a bakery, she begins work for a cleaning service, after she sees a television commercial advertising it. The service is headed by a man named Lodger, who specializes in mopping up what is left behind at crime scenes. She goes to the office, inquires about a job and later is (to the dismay of Elena, her cleaning partner) offered the opportunity to clean up after an execution by her favorite at-large serial killer, The Blue Blood Killer (so named because his victims are all wealthy women).

The two women go to the scene of the crime and begin cleaning up the mess. Elena diligently works away, trying to get out of there as soon as possible; meanwhile Gabriela discovers what she believes to be the name of the serial killer - "Paul Guell" - beneath a pool of blood, but covers it up so that Elena won't see and think she is weird. Due to the amount of blood, they have to leave and come back the next day.

While out on a date with ex-colleague Eduardo, Gabriela reveals to him what she found out and after failing to clearly explain, convinces him to go to the house that same night, before it all gets cleaned up.

Unbeknown to Gabriela and Eduardo, the killer is still in the building after accidentally locking himself in the wine cellar while trying to escape. Gabriela opens the door to the cellar, when Eduardo freaks out and decides he wants to go, leaving the door ajar and the killer an escape route. Eduardo leaves when Gabriela refuses to go with him, and she picks up a knife, dancing around the house where the blood is, acting out what she thinks happened - all while the killer watches.

When Eduardo returns after a second thought, the killer hits him over the head and hides him in the wine cellar. He soon stops Gabriela and forces her to walk him through what happened, checking that she knows the full story, and when they come to the end, they briefly argue about Gabriela's theory of heads talking after decapitation. The killer then decides it's time for Gabriela to die, but in a struggle, he slips and is knocked out on the tiled floor.

When he begins to come to, Gabriela, out of sheer curiosity, picks up the knife and cuts his head off. She slowly lifts up his head and he mumbles her name, to which Gabriela smiles with satisfaction.

In a post-credits scene, Gabriela and Eduardo are driving in a car and Gabriela plays the tape that recorded the killer's last word after his beheading.

== Cast ==
- Angela Jones as Gabriela
- William Baldwin as Paul Guell
- Lois Chiles as Katrina Brandt
- Barry Corbin as Lodger
- Sabrina Cowan as Red Haired Waitress
- Lupita Ferrer as Marie Clement
- Daisy Fuentes as Clara
- Mel Gorham as Elena
- Carmen Lopez as Lourdes
- Kelly Preston as Kelly Hogue
- Bruce Ramsay as Eduardo
- Caridad Ravelo as Joan
- Vivienne Sendaydiego as Eva
- Sandra Thigpen as Grace
- Charles Tucker as San the Barback (as Charles J. Tucker)
- George Clooney as Seth Gecko (archive footage)
- Quentin Tarantino as Richard "Richie" Gecko (archive footage)

== Connection to From Dusk till Dawn ==
Curdled would appear to be set in the same universe as the vampire action film From Dusk till Dawn. Kelly Preston reprises the character of newscaster Kelly Hogue, giving a news report about the "missing" Gecko brothers. Tarantino, who wrote and co-starred in From Dusk Till Dawn, executive produced this film and briefly appears as Richie Gecko in archive footage.

== Critical reception ==
The film received generally negative reviews. On Rotten Tomatoes, it has an approval rating of 17% based on reviews from 12 critics, and average rating of 4.70/10.

Roger Ebert of the Chicago Sun-Times gave the film two out of four stars, saying that the film "is not very interesting", but praised Jones' ability to play "a tricky role with the right note of deadpan delight". Todd McCarthy of Variety, said that Jones "manages to hold viewer interest throughout with a devilishly witty turn... despite having desperately little to work with".

== Home media ==
Buena Vista Home Entertainment (under the Miramax Home Entertainment banner) released the film on VHS in the US in 1997, with the film subsequently receiving a US LaserDisc release on March 4, 1998. In Australia, it was released on VHS in approximately late 1997, also via Buena Vista Home Entertainment. Buena Vista Home Entertainment released it on DVD in the US on March 2, 2004. The 2004 DVD includes an audio commentary with Reb Braddock and John Maass.

In December 2010, Miramax was sold by The Walt Disney Company, their owners since 1993. That same month, the studio was taken over by private equity firm Filmyard Holdings. In 2011, Filmyard Holdings licensed the Miramax library to streaming site Netflix. This deal included Curdled, and ran for five years, eventually ending on June 1, 2016.

In March 2016, Filmyard Holdings sold Miramax to Qatari company beIN Media Group. In April 2020, ViacomCBS (now known as Paramount Skydance) bought a 49% stake in Miramax, which gave them the rights to the Miramax library. Curdled is among the 700 titles they acquired in the deal, and since April 2020, the film has been distributed by Paramount Pictures. Afterwards, Paramount began re-releasing many Miramax titles on home video, and on June 23, 2021, Paramount Japan released Curdled on Blu-ray in that country. Paramount licensed the film to US company Kino Lorber for a 4K restoration. Kino Lorber released this restored version on a 4K Ultra HD Blu-ray on July 29, 2025. This release included the 2004 commentary, in addition to featuring two new commentary tracks; one with Angela Jones and Braddock and Maass, and another with film historian Dwayne Epstein. It also includes a new interview with Jones.
