= Smoke (film) =

1995 American film directed by Wayne Wang

- Theatrical release poster
- Directed by: Wayne Wang
- Written by: Paul Auster
- Produced by: Greg Johnson; Peter Newman; Kenzo Horikoshi; Hisami Kuroiwa
- Starring: William Hurt; Harvey Keitel; Stockard Channing; Harold Perrineau Jr.; Giancarlo Esposito; Ashley Judd; Forest Whitaker
- Cinematography: Adam Holender
- Edited by: Maysie Hoy
- Music by: Rachel Portman
- Production companies: NDF International; Euro Space; Smoke Productions
- Distributed by: Miramax Films
- Release date: June 9, 1995
- Running time: 112 minutes
- Countries: United States; Germany; Japan
- Language: English
- Budget: $7 million
- Box office: $38 million

Smoke is a 1995 American independent drama film directed by Wayne Wang. The original story was written by Paul Auster, who also wrote the screenplay. The film was produced by Greg Johnson, Peter Newman, Kenzo Horikoshi, and Hisami Kuroiwa. Among others, it features Harvey Keitel, William Hurt, Stockard Channing, Harold Perrineau Jr., Giancarlo Esposito, Ashley Judd, and Forest Whitaker.

== Plot ==
The film follows the lives of multiple characters, all of whom are connected via their patronage of a small Brooklyn tobacconist store managed by Augustus "Auggie" Wren. Auggie has been taking photographs of the store from across the street at 8:00am every morning and collects all his photos in albums. Paul Benjamin, a recently widowed writer, spends an evening with Auggie and is initially dismissive of his photography project, saying that the photos are "all the same". Auggie replies that they only look the same superficially, but they are in fact all different, with each photo representing a unique moment in time. Auggie implores Paul to "slow down", which he agrees to do. Paul sees his wife in one of the pictures and breaks down.

The next day, Paul is lost in thought as he crosses the street and is saved from being run down by a truck by Rashid, a young black man. Paul invites Rashid to stay at his apartment as a form of thanks. Rashid accepts, but irritates Paul by making noise and breaking dishes while Paul is writing. Paul asks Rashid to leave, which he does. Paul is visited by Rashid's aunt, who demands to know why Rashid has been staying with Paul. She reveals that Rashid's real name is Thomas, and that he is from an underprivileged background. She also says that Rashid has been estranged from his father since childhood, and that his father had been spotted recently at a gas station outside the city.

Rashid tracks down his father, Cyrus Cole, at his gas station, which he sketches. Cyrus, not recognizing him, befriends Rashid and hires him to carry out renovation work at the gas station. Rashid conceals his identity and tells Cyrus that his name is Paul Benjamin. His father has an artificial arm, which he tells Rashid was the result of a car accident in which his then wife (who was in fact Rashid's mother) was killed. Cyrus says that he was driving drunk and that his artificial arm is God's way of reminding him to better himself. Rashid leaves the gas station, without any notice.

Rashid returns to Paul's apartment to give him a secondhand television as a gift. As Rashid tries to leave, Paul forces him to stay and to call his aunt to reassure her that he is safe. Paul finds almost $6,000 that Rashid has stashed in the apartment. When Paul confronts Rashid about the money, he reveals that he took the money from robbers, which is why he is in hiding. Paul implores Rashid to return the money. Rashid disappears without explaining where he has gone. Paul and Auggie track Rashid back to Cyrus' gas station. Rashid reveals his true identity. Cyrus finally understands that Rashid is in fact his son but initially rejects him. After an emotional breakdown, they reconcile. Rashid is hired to work at Auggie's shop.

Auggie imports a box of Cuban cigars that he intends to sell to city officials; he has spent $5,000 on the shipment, the entirety of his savings. Rashid ruins the cigars when he is left to look after the shop on his own by allowing a sink to overflow. He gives Auggie the $5,000 to keep his job. Auggie initially refuses but eventually agrees to keep the money. Ruby McNutt, Auggie's ex-girlfriend, visits the shop and asks Auggie for money to cover rehab costs for a woman named Felicity, who she says is his daughter and who is pregnant and on drugs. Auggie later gives her the same $5,000 that was given by Rashid. Auggie asks Ruby if Felicity really is his daughter, to which he receives an ambiguous response.

Paul tells Auggie that he has been asked by The New York Times to write a story to be published on Christmas Day. With Paul suffering writer's block, Auggie offers to tell him the best Christmas story he has ever heard in exchange for lunch. Auggie tells a tender story about spending Christmas with a blind grandmother who at first thinks, and then pretends, he is her grandson. After the grandmother falls asleep, Auggie finds stacks of stolen cameras in the bathroom and decides to take one for himself. Weeks later, he regrets the theft and decides to return the camera, only to find that the grandmother has died in the meantime, meaning that she had spent her last Christmas with him. Paul is impressed by the story, but implicitly suspects that Auggie invented it.

During and after the closing credits, Auggie's story is enacted in a poignant black-and-white sequence to the soundtrack of Tom Waits's "Innocent When You Dream."

== Cast ==
- William Hurt as Paul Benjamin
- Harvey Keitel as Augustus "Auggie" Wren
- Stockard Channing as Ruby McNutt
- Harold Perrineau as Thomas "Rashid" Cole (as Harold Perrineau Jr.)
- Jared Harris as Jimmy Rose
- Giancarlo Esposito as Tommy Finelli, OTB Man #1
- José Zúñiga as Jerry, OTB Man #2
- Stephen Gevedon as Dennis, OTB Man #3
- Ashley Judd as Felicity McNutt
- Forest Whitaker as Cyrus Cole
- Malik Yoba as The Creeper
- Victor Argo as Vinnie
- Daniel Auster as Book Thief
- Deirdre O'Connell as Sue, The Waitress
- Michelle Hurst as Aunt Em
- Erica Gimpel as Doreen Cole
- Mary B. Ward as April Lee
- Clarice Taylor as Grandma Ethel

== Script ==
The screenplay is based on an op-ed piece titled Auggie Wren's Christmas Story, which appeared in The New York Times on December 25, 1990.

== Reception ==
On Rotten Tomatoes the film has a rating of 89% based on 35 reviews. The consensus summarizes: "Smoke draws in a stellar ensemble, holds the audience's attention with a robust blend of connected stories, and sends viewers out on a pleasurable high." Metacritic, which uses a weighted average, assigned the film a score of 70 out of 100, based on 15 critics, indicating "generally favorable" reviews.

It opened on 4 screens (including two in New York and one in Los Angeles) and grossed $70,744 for the weekend, being the number one exclusive release in New York and L.A. It went on to gross $8 million in the United States and Canada and $30 million internationally.

== Awards ==
Won

- Silver Bear (Wayne Wang) 45th Berlin International Film Festival, 1995
- Danish Film Critics Bodil Awards for Best American Film, 1995
- German Film Award for Best Foreign Film, 1995
- MTV Movie Award for Best Sandwich in a Movie - Ham and Cheese Sandwich
- Independent Spirit Award for Best First Screenplay (Paul Auster), 1995

Nominated

- Stockard Channing - Best Supporting Actress - Screen Actors Guild

== Sequel ==
The film was followed by Blue in the Face, a sequel of sorts that continues following a few of the characters and introduces several new ones.

== Legacy ==
The character Augustus "Auggie" Wren (played by Harvey Keitel) is modelled after the real-life owner of Augie's Jazz Bar, which closed in 1998. When the establishment reopened in 1999, the new owners could not keep the former establishment's name. To honor its legacy, they named the new club after the 1995 film.

A VHS copy of the film can be seen on top of the television set during the house party finale of the 1996 horror movie Scream.
