= Butt Boy =

- Directed by: Tyler Cornack
- Written by: Tyler Cornack; Ryan Koch
- Produced by: Ryan Koch; Brian Wolfe
- Cinematography: Billy Morean
- Edited by: Austin Lewis
- Music by: Feathers
- Production company: Epic Pictures
- Release date: April 14, 2020
- Country: United States
- Language: English

Butt Boy is a 2020 American dark comedy horror film written by Tyler Cornack and Ryan Koch and directed by Cornack in his directorial debut. The film is a spinoff from a Tiny Cinema comedy sketch.

== Plot ==
Chip Gutchel is an IT worker for sales company RTM. One day, while undergoing his first prostate exam, he feels immense sexual satisfaction. Later, he tries to replicate the feeling by inserting a bar of soap into his rectum, but finds that it has seemingly been absorbed into his body. He does the same with a remote control, and the same thing happens. This triggers an addiction in Chip, and he escalates to putting the family dog, Rocky, in his butt. This culminates in him absorbing a baby he sees at the park. Depressed, Chip attempts to hang himself, but fails.

Nine years later, Chip has his addiction under control by going to Alcoholics Anonymous meetings and disguising the true nature of his problem. One day, he is directed to mentor a new member, divorced police detective Russel Fox. While having dinner together, Russel vents about his compulsions for Tom Collins cocktails, and hearing this triggers a relapse in Chip. Over the next few days, Russel calls Chip for guidance, but gets no answers.

During take-your-child-to-work-day at RTM, Andrew, the son of Chip's coworker Jon, goes missing. Russel is assigned to investigate and immediately becomes suspicious of Chip due to the security cameras being erased (something which, as the IT specialist for the company, only Chip would know how to do). Chip then resumes attending AA meetings after an argument with his wife, Anne. While this is happening, Russel finds evidence of Chip's involvement in Andrew's disappearance and learns the true nature of his problem. It's also shown that the baby Chip absorbed at the park was Russel's son, Russel Jr (he had previously been shown stalking his ex-wife, who had since remarried and gotten pregnant).

Anne invites Russel to dinner, and Russel takes the chance to steal a computer disc showing the missing security footage. Realising this, Chip chases after Russel in his car, and it's revealed that Chip's anus can now powerfully suck in objects like a vacuum. Russel narrowly escapes, but loses the disc, and is subsequently fired from the police. Enraged, Russel tracks Chip down to a laser tag birthday party for his son. He manages to shoot Chip, but is sucked into his anus before he is able to kill him. Chip is hailed as a hero for apparently saving the children at the party from a crazed madman.

Russel wakes up inside Chip's bowels, where it's revealed that everything he has absorbed is still intact, including the original bar of soap and remote control. He meets Andrew and Russel Jr., who are miraculously alive, having survived on pieces of undigested food. One month later, Chip's physical therapist gives him a rectal exam, and Russel manages to spot the fingers, thus showing a possible way out. Working together, he, Russel Jr., and Andrew manage to push the bar of soap, the remote control, and Rocky out of Chip's anus. Before they can push out Andrew, however, Chip drinks a bottle of stomach elixir, fatally scalding Andrew and blocking the way out.

At an award ceremony held by the mayor, Chip is about to give a speech while the elixir is closing in on Russel and Russel Jr.. Out of desperation, Russel takes his lighter and triggers an explosion. This causes Chip's body to blow apart and spray all over the ceremony. At the hospital, Russel Jr. is successfully treated, and Russel walks out the door triumphantly

== Cast ==
- Tyler Cornack as Chip
- Tyler Rice as Russel
- Shelby Dash as Anne
- Nino Hara as Russel Jr.
- Austin Lewis as Rick Mitchum, Chip's boss
- Brad Potts as Police Chief John Lazarra
- Wilky Lau as Jon Lee
- Kai Henderson as Andrew Lee

== Release ==
Butt Boy had its world premiere at Fantastic Fest 2019 and was screened at a number of genre festivals throughout the year, where it was a "minor sensation".

In February 2020, it was announced that Epic Pictures had bought the U.S. rights to the film. It debuted on various VOD platforms on April 14, 2020. Due to the COVID-19 pandemic, the limited theatrical release scheduled earlier that month was canceled.

== Reception ==
On the review aggregator website Rotten Tomatoes, the film holds an approval rating of 71% based on 59 reviews. The site's consensus reads: "Its puerile premise invites low expectations, but viewers who sit down in search of boldly humorous provocations won't leave Butt Boy brokenhearted". On Metacritic, the film has a weighted average score of 56 out of 100, based on 8 critics, indicating "mixed or average" reviews.

In his review for Variety, Dennis Harvey praised Butt Boy for "the drollest execution possible of the most juvenile concept". He noted the film's successful balance of lowbrow humor and withheld gross-out moments, making it enjoyable for those who appreciate stupid ideas executed smartly. He also highlighted the film's lower-key stylistic approach, reminiscent of 1980s cop-thriller tropes, and the dedicated performances of the cast in their deliberately monotonous roles. Writing for The New York Times, Jeannette Catsoulis described the film as "hilariously bawdy" and as "an act of vivacious vulgarity". She notes that despite its absurdity, the movie refuses to be dismissed as a juvenile provocation and delves into themes of addiction, grief, and loneliness, while also surprising with unexpected moments of beauty and pathos. Catsoulis concludes her review by highlighting the film's "aggressive" originality and divisiveness.

Writing for the Los Angeles Times, film critic Justin Chang praised the film for its audacious and outlandish concept, dubbing it "either the best or worst rectal-kink detective noir/addiction drama/supervillain origin story ever made". He criticized the film's failure to fully explore the psychosexual implications of the protagonist's compulsion and described it as a half-hour comic sketch stretched out to an unnecessarily long 100-minute runtime and notes that despite some chemistry between the lead actors, the film's "plodding, procedural-style storytelling" and excessive contrivances made it unentertaining.

In his review for The Hollywood Reporter, John Defore criticizes describes the film as "a juvenile gag" and a "constipated attempt at cult comedy". He notes that the movie's attempts to be provocative and outrageous result in confusion rather than entertainment and that it will only appeal to "a very specific sort of irony-hungry moviegoer" while leaving most others unimpressed. Eric Kohn of IndieWire gave the film a B− and notes that he finds Butt Boy to be surprisingly "slick and entertaining", despite its juvenile premise. However, he also notes that the film's ludicrous nature and outlandish concept may test some viewers' patience, even though it leaves an impression and showcases potential for its director.

ScreenAnarchy describes Butt Boy as an incredibly bizarre experience with a nonsensical premise played straight, comparing it to a Quentin Dupieux film shot like a TV movie. It notes that despite revealing budgetary constraints in its execution, the film effectively utilizes limited means, reserving its "craziest" visuals for the final thirty minutes. The review commends the film for its substantial commitment to its peculiar concept, portraying it as a true original.

In 2025, director John Waters included Butt Boy on his ballot for the New York Times's 100 Best Movies of the 21st Century.
