= Blue in the Face =

1995 film by Paul Auster, Wayne Wang

- Promotional film poster
- Directed by: Paul Auster; Wayne Wang
- Screenplay by: Paul Auster; Wayne Wang
- Based on: Characters by Paul Auster
- Produced by: Peter Newman; Greg Johnson; Diana Phillips
- Starring: Victor Argo; Giancarlo Esposito; Michael J. Fox; Mel Gorham; Jim Jarmusch; Harvey Keitel; Lou Reed; Roseanne; Mira Sorvino; Lily Tomlin; Malik Yoba
- Cinematography: Adam Holender; Harvey Wang
- Edited by: Maysie Hoy; Christopher Tellefsen
- Music by: John Lurie
- Distributed by: Miramax Films
- Release date: October 13, 1995
- Running time: 89 minutes
- Country: United States
- Language: English
- Budget: $2 million
- Box office: $1,268,636

Blue in the Face is a 1995 American comedy film directed by Wayne Wang and Paul Auster. It stars Harvey Keitel leading an ensemble cast, including Giancarlo Esposito, Roseanne Barr, Michael J. Fox, Lily Tomlin, Victor Argo, Mira Sorvino, Lou Reed, Keith David, Jim Jarmusch, Jared Harris, RuPaul, and Madonna.

Blue in the Face was filmed over a five-day period as a follow-up to Wang's 1995 film Smoke. During production of Smoke, Keitel and the others ad-libbed scenes in-character between takes and a sequel was made using this improvised material.

Lily Tomlin was nominated for an American Comedy Award as "Funniest Supporting Actress in a Motion Picture" for her performance in this picture.

Blue in the Face features songs by singer Selena. Her bilingual duet with David Byrne, "God's Child (Baila Conmigo)", appears on the film's soundtrack.

== Plot ==
The film once again centers on the Brooklyn Cigar Store and manager Auggie (Harvey Keitel), although most of the other characters are different. The store owner's frustrated wife Dot (Roseanne Barr) is one of them, and one of the plotlines follows her attempts to seduce Auggie. Madonna, Michael J. Fox, Lily Tomlin and Lou Reed as himself also put in appearances.

== Cast ==
- Harvey Keitel as Augustus "Auggie" Wren
- Victor Argo as Vinnie
- Keith David as Jackie Robinson
- Giancarlo Esposito as Tommy Finelli
- Michael J. Fox as Pete Maloney
- Mel Gorham as Violet
- Jared Harris as Jimmy Rose
- Jim Jarmusch as Bob
- Madonna as Singing Telegram Girl
- Lou Reed as Man With Strange Glasses
- Michael Badalucco as Statistician
- Roseanne Barr as Dot
- Mira Sorvino as Young Lady
- Lily Tomlin as Waffle Eater
- Malik Yoba as Watch Man
- Rupaul as Dance Leader

== Reception ==
The film received mixed reviews. On Rotten Tomatoes, the film has a rating of 42% based on reviews from 24 critics, with an average rating of 5.7/10. Metacritic, which uses a weighted average, assigned the film a score of 56 out of 100, based on 16 critics, indicating "mixed or average" reviews.

Roger Ebert of the Chicago Sun Times gave the film 2.5 out of 4 stars, remarking that the movie "was shot in six days, and sometimes feels like it…Some of the bits work and others don't, but no one seems to be keeping score, and that's part of the movie's charm. Ebert also notes that "Smoke is, of course, a much better film, and if you haven't seen it, then you should start there and not here. Blue in the Face is more of a footnote."
