= List of songs recorded by the Cranberries =

This is a list of released songs recorded by the Cranberries.

== Songs ==
Key
†	Indicates single release
‡	Indicates promotional single release

Name of song, original release, and year of release
Title	Year	Original release	Writer(s)	Ref.
"7 Years"	2001	CD-R test pressing of Wake Up and Smell the Coffee	Dolores O'Riordan, Noel Hogan	
"A Fast One"	1990	Water Circle (as The Cranberry Saw Us)	O'Riordan, N. Hogan	
"A Place I Know"	2019	In the End	O'Riordan, N. Hogan	
"All Over Now" †	2019	In the End	O'Riordan	
"Always"	2012	Bonus track on the iTunes release of Roses	O'Riordan	
"Analyse" †	2001	Wake Up and Smell the Coffee	O'Riordan	
"Animal Instinct" †	1999	Bury the Hatchet	O'Riordan, N. Hogan	
"Astral Projections"	2012	Roses	O'Riordan, N. Hogan	
"Away"	1994	B-side of "Zombie"	O'Riordan	
"Baby Blues"	1999	B-side of "Animal Instinct"	O'Riordan	
"Bosnia"	1996	To the Faithful Departed	O'Riordan	
"Cape Town"	2001	Bonus track on Wake Up and Smell the Coffee	O'Riordan, N. Hogan	
"Carry On"	2001	Wake Up and Smell the Coffee	O'Riordan	
"Catch Me If You Can"	2019	In the End	O'Riordan	
"Chocolate Brown"	2001	Wake Up and Smell the Coffee	O'Riordan, N. Hogan	
"Chrome Paint"	1990	Water Circle (as The Cranberry Saw Us)	O'Riordan, N. Hogan	
"(They Long to Be) Close to You" (Carpenters cover)	1994	If I Were a Carpenter	Burt Bacharach, Hal David	
"The Concept"	2001	Wake Up and Smell the Coffee	O'Riordan	
"Conduct"	2012	Roses	O'Riordan, N. Hogan	
"Copycat" ‡	1999	Bury the Hatchet	O'Riordan, N. Hogan	
"Cordell"	1996	To the Faithful Departed	O'Riordan	
"Crazy Heart"	2019	In the End	O'Riordan, N. Hogan	
"Daffodil Lament"	1994	No Need to Argue	O'Riordan	
"Delilah"	1999	Bury the Hatchet	O'Riordan, N. Hogan	
"Desperate Andy"	1999	Bury the Hatchet	O'Riordan, N. Hogan	
"Disappointment"	1994	No Need to Argue	O'Riordan, N. Hogan	
"Do You Know"	2001	Wake Up and Smell the Coffee	O'Riordan	
"Dreaming My Dreams" ‡	1994	No Need to Argue	O'Riordan	
"Dreams" †	1992	Everybody Else Is Doing It, So Why Can't We?	N. Hogan, O'Riordan	
"Dying In The Sun"	1999	Bury the Hatchet	O'Riordan	
"Dying Inside"	2001	Wake Up and Smell the Coffee	O'Riordan, N. Hogan	
"Electric Blue"	1996	To the Faithful Departed	O'Riordan, N. Hogan	
"Empty"	1994	No Need to Argue	O'Riordan, N. Hogan	
"Every Morning"	2001	Wake Up and Smell the Coffee	O'Riordan	
"Everything I Said"	1994	No Need to Argue	O'Riordan, N. Hogan	
"Fee Fi Fo"	1999	Bury the Hatchet	O'Riordan, N. Hogan	
"Fire & Soul" ‡	2012	Roses	O'Riordan, N. Hogan	
"Forever Yellow Skies"	1996	To the Faithful Departed	O'Riordan	
"Free to Decide" †	1996	To the Faithful Departed	O'Riordan	
"The Glory"	2017	Something Else	O'Riordan, N. Hogan	
"Go Your Own Way" (Fleetwood Mac cover)	1998	Legacy: A Tribute To Fleetwood Mac's Rumours	Lindsey Buckingham	
"God Be With You"	1997	The Devil's Own (Original Soundtrack) (credited to O'Riordan)	O'Riordan	
"Good Morning God"	1990	Anything (as The Cranberry Saw Us)	Niall Quinn	
"Got It"	2019	In the End	O'Riordan	
"Hollywood" †	1996	To the Faithful Departed	O'Riordan	
"How"	1993	Everybody Else Is Doing It, So Why Can't We?	O'Riordan	
"How's It Going To Bleed"	1990	Anything (as The Cranberry Saw Us)	N. Hogan, Quinn	
"I Can't Be with You" †	1994	No Need to Argue	O'Riordan, N. Hogan	
"I Don't Need"	1994	B-side of "Zombie"	O'Riordan, N. Hogan	
"I Just Shot John Lennon"	1996	To the Faithful Departed	O'Riordan, N. Hogan	
"I Really Hope"	2001	Wake Up and Smell the Coffee	O'Riordan, N. Hogan	
"I Still Do"	1993	Everybody Else Is Doing It, So Why Can't We?	N. Hogan, O'Riordan	
"I Will Always"	1993	Everybody Else Is Doing It, So Why Can't We?	O'Riordan	
"The Icicle Melts"	1994	No Need to Argue	O'Riordan	
"I'm Still Remembering" ‡	1996	To the Faithful Departed	O'Riordan	
"Illusion"	2019	In the End	O'Riordan, N. Hogan	
"In It Together"	2012	Bonus track on Roses	O’Riordan, N. Hogan	
"In The End"	2019	In the End	O’Riordan, N. Hogan	
"In the Ghetto" (Elvis Presley cover)	2001	Bonus track on Wake Up and Smell the Coffee	Mac Davis	
"Intermission"	1996	To the Faithful Departed	O’Riordan	
"Íosa"	2018	Everybody Else Is Doing It, So Why Can’t We? (25th Anniversary Edition)	O’Riordan	
"Joe"	1996	To the Faithful Departed	O’Riordan, N. Hogan	
"Just My Imagination" †	1999	Bury the Hatchet	O’Riordan, N. Hogan	
"Liar" ‡	1993	B-side of "Linger"	O’Riordan, N. Hogan	
"Linger" †	1993	Everybody Else Is Doing It, So Why Can’t We?	N. Hogan, O'Riordan	
"Losing My Mind"	2012	Roses	O’Riordan, N. Hogan	
"Lost"	2019	In the End	O’Riordan	
"Loud and Clear"	1999	Bury the Hatchet	O’Riordan, N. Hogan	
"Many Days"	2001	Asian Tour Edition of Wake Up and Smell the Coffee	O’Riordan, N. Hogan	
"Never Grow Old"	2001	Wake Up and Smell the Coffee	O’Riordan	
"New New York"	2002	Stars: The Best of 1992-2002	O’Riordan, N. Hogan	
"No Need to Argue"	1994	No Need to Argue	O’Riordan	
"Not Sorry"	1993	Everybody Else Is Doing It, So Why Can’t We?	N. Hogan, O'Riordan	
"Nothing Left At All"	1991	Uncertain	O’Riordan, N. Hogan, Mike Hogan, Fergal Lawler	
"Ode to My Family" †	1994	No Need to Argue	O’Riordan, N. Hogan	
"Paparazzi On Mopeds"	1999	B-side of "Animal Instinct"	O’Riordan	
"Pathetic Senses"	1991	Uncertain	O’Riordan, N. Hogan, M. Hogan, Lawler	
"Perfect World"	2012	Roses (Extended Version) (iTunes UK release)	O’Riordan	
"The Picture I View"	1996	B-side of "Free to Decide"	O'Riordan	
"Pretty"	1993	Everybody Else Is Doing It, So Why Can’t We?	N. Hogan, O'Riordan	
"Pretty Eyes"	2001	Wake Up and Smell the Coffee	O’Riordan	
"The Pressure"	2019	In the End	O'Riordan, N. Hogan	
"Promises" †	1999	Bury the Hatchet	O’Riordan	
"Put Me Down"	1993	Everybody Else Is Doing It, So Why Can’t We?	N. Hogan, O'Riordan	
"Raining In My Heart" ‡	2012	Roses	O’Riordan, N. Hogan	
"Reason"	1993	B-side of "Linger"	O’Riordan, N. Hogan	
"The Rebels"	1996	To the Faithful Departed	O'Riordan	
"Ridiculous Thoughts" †	1994	No Need to Argue	O’Riordan, N. Hogan	
"Roses"	2012	Roses	O’Riordan, N. Hogan	
"Rupture"	2017	Something Else	O’Riordan	
"Salvation" †	1996	To the Faithful Departed	O’Riordan, N. Hogan	
"Saving Grace"	1999	Bury the Hatchet	O’Riordan	
"Schizophrenic Playboys"	2012	Roses	O’Riordan, N. Hogan	
"Serendipity"	2012	Bonus track on Roses	O’Riordan, N. Hogan	
"Shattered"	1999	Bury the Hatchet	O’Riordan, N. Hogan	
"Shine Down"	1990	Nothing Left at All (as The Cranberry Saw Us)	O’Riordan, N. Hogan	
"Show Me" ‡	2012	Roses	O’Riordan	
"So Cold in Ireland"	1994	B-side of "Ode to My Family"	O’Riordan	
"So Good"	2012	Roses	O’Riordan	
"Someday"	2012	Bonus track on the Japanese release of Roses	O’Riordan, N. Hogan	
"Sorry Son"	1999	Bury the Hatchet	O’Riordan	
"Stars" †	2002	Stars: The Best of 1992-2002	O’Riordan, N. Hogan	
"Still Can't..." ‡	1993	Everybody Else Is Doing It, So Why Can't We?	N. Hogan, O'Riordan	
"Stop Me"	2012	Bonus track on the iTunes Canada release of Roses	O'Riordan	
"Storm in a Teacup"	1990	Anything (as The Cranberry Saw Us)	Quinn	
"Such a Shame"	2000	Bury the Hatchet (The Complete Sessions)	O'Riordan	
"Such a Waste"	2002	Bonus track on "This Is The Day"	O'Riordan, N. Hogan	
"Summer Song"	2019	In the End	O'Riordan, Dan Brodbeck	
"Sunday" ‡	1993	Everybody Else Is Doing It, So Why Can't We?	N. Hogan, O'Riordan	
"The Sweetest Thing"	1999	B-side of "Promises"	O'Riordan	
"Them"	1991	Uncertain	O'Riordan, N. Hogan, M. Hogan, Lawler	
"This Is The Day" †	2001	Wake Up and Smell the Coffee	O'Riordan	
"Throw Me Down a Big Stairs"	1990	Anything (as The Cranberry Saw Us)	Quinn, M. Smyth	
"Time is Ticking Out" †	2001	Wake Up and Smell the Coffee	O'Riordan, N. Hogan	
"Tomorrow" †	2012	Roses	O'Riordan	
"Twenty One"	1994	No Need to Argue	O'Riordan, N. Hogan	
"Uncertain"	1991	Uncertain	O'Riordan, N. Hogan, M. Hogan, Lawler	
"Waiting in Walthamstow" ‡	2012	Roses	O'Riordan	
"Wake Me When It's Over" †	2019	In the End	O'Riordan	
"Wake Up And Smell The Coffee"	2001	Wake Up and Smell the Coffee	O'Riordan, N. Hogan	
"Waltzing Back"	1993	Everybody Else Is Doing It, So Why Can't We?	O'Riordan	
"Wanted"	1993	Everybody Else Is Doing It, So Why Can't We?	N. Hogan, O'Riordan	
"War Child"	1996	To the Faithful Departed	O'Riordan	
"What You Were"	1992	B-side of "Dreams"	O'Riordan	
"What's On My Mind"	1999	Bury the Hatchet	O'Riordan	
"When You're Gone" †	1996	To the Faithful Departed	O'Riordan	
"Why?" †	2017	Something Else	O'Riordan	
"Will You Remember?"	1996	To the Faithful Departed	O'Riordan, N. Hogan	
"Woman Without Pride"	2000	Bury the Hatchet (The Complete Sessions)	O'Riordan	
"Yeat's Grave"	1994	No Need to Argue	O'Riordan	
"You and Me" †	1999	Bury the Hatchet	O'Riordan, N. Hogan	
"Zombie" †	1994	No Need to Argue	O'Riordan	
