= Treasure Box – The Complete Sessions 1991–1999 =

Treasure Box - The Complete Sessions 1991–1999

Box set by The Cranberries
- Released: 2 April 2002
- Recorded: 1991–1999
- Genre: Alternative rock Celtic rock
- Length: 265:09
- Label: Island
- Producer: Stephen Street, Pearse Gilmore, Bruce Fairbairn, The Cranberries and Benedict Fenner

The Cranberries chronology
Wake Up and Smell the Coffee (2001)	Treasure Box - The Complete Sessions 1991–1999 (2002)	Stars: The Best of 1992–2002 (2002)

Professional ratings
Review scores
Source	Rating
AllMusic	4/5 stars

Treasure Box for Boys and Girls – The Complete Sessions 1991–1999 is a compilation boxset from the Irish band The Cranberries. It is a collection of the complete sessions releases of their first four albums.

== Track listing ==
Disc 1 – Everybody Else Is Doing It, So Why Can't We?

No.	Title	Length
1.	"I Still Do"	3:17
2.	"Dreams"	4:32
3.	"Sunday"	3:30
4.	"Pretty"	2:16
5.	"Waltzing Back"	3:38
6.	"Not Sorry"	4:20
7.	"Linger"	4:34
8.	"Wanted"	2:08
9.	"Still Can't..."	3:40
10.	"I Will Always"	2:42
11.	"How"	2:51
12.	"Put Me Down"	3:33
13.	"Reason"	2:02
14.	"Them"	3:42
15.	"What You Were"	3:41
16.	"Liar"	2:22
17.	"Pretty" (Pret-a-Porter Remix)	3:41
18.	"How" (Radical Mix)	2:58
Total length:		60:27

Disc 2 – No Need to Argue

No.	Title	Length
1.	"Ode to My Family"	4:30
2.	"I Can't Be with You"	3:07
3.	"Twenty One"	3:07
4.	"Zombie"	5:06
5.	"Empty"	3:26
6.	"Everything I Said"	3:52
7.	"The Icicle Melts"	2:54
8.	"Disappointment"	4:14
9.	"Ridiculous Thoughts"	4:31
10.	"Dreaming My Dreams"	3:37
11.	"Yeat's [sic] Grave"	2:59
12.	"Daffodil Lament"	6:14
13.	"No Need to Argue"	2:54
14.	"Away"	2:38
15.	"I Don't Need"	3:32
16.	"(They Long to Be) Close to You" (by Burt Bacharach and Hal David)	2:41
17.	"So Cold in Ireland"	4:45
18.	"Zombie" (Camel's Hump mix)	7:54
Total length:		72:01

Disc 3 – To the Faithful Departed

No.	Title	Length
1.	"Hollywood"	5:08
2.	"Salvation"	2:23
3.	"When You're Gone"	4:56
4.	"Free to Decide"	4:25
5.	"War Child"	3:50
6.	"Forever Yellow Skies"	4:09
7.	"The Rebels"	3:20
8.	"Intermission"	2:08
9.	"I Just Shot John Lennon"	2:41
10.	"Electric Blue"	4:51
11.	"I'm Still Remembering"	4:48
12.	"Will You Remember"	2:49
13.	"Joe"	3:22
14.	"Bosnia"	5:40
15.	"Cordell"	3:41
16.	"The Picture I View"	2:28
17.	"Ave Maria" (Luciano Pavarotti with Dolores O'Riordan, live)	4:13
18.	"Go Your Own Way" (Lindsey Buckingham)	4:03
19.	"God Be With You" (from The Devil's Own O.S.T., Dolores O'Riordan solo)	3:34
Total length:		72:29

Disc 4 – Bury the Hatchet

No.	Title	Length
1.	"Animal Instinct"	3:31
2.	"Loud and Clear"	2:45
3.	"Promises"	5:27
4.	"You and Me"	3:35
5.	"Just My Imagination"	3:41
6.	"Shattered"	3:42
7.	"Desperate Andy"	3:44
8.	"Saving Grace"	3:08
9.	"Copycat"	2:53
10.	"What's on My Mind"	3:12
11.	"Delilah"	3:32
12.	"Fee Fi Fo"	4:47
13.	"Dying in the Sun"	3:32
14.	"Sorry Son"	3:28
15.	"Baby Blues"	2:38
16.	"Sweetest Thing"	3:34
17.	"Woman Without Pride"	2:26
18.	"Such a Shame"	4:23
19.	"Paparazzi on Mopeds"	4:33
Total length:		60:12
