= Stars: The Best of 1992–2002 =

2002 greatest hits album by The Cranberries

Greatest hits album by the Cranberries
- Released: 16 September 2002
- Recorded: 1992–2002
- Genre: Alternative rock
- Length: 77:05
- Label: Island
- Producers: Stephen Street; Bruce Fairbairn; The Cranberries; Benedict Fenner

The Cranberries chronology
Treasure Box – The Complete Sessions 1991–1999 (2002)	Stars: The Best of 1992–2002 (2002)	Gold (2008)

Singles from Stars: The Best of 1992–2002
- 1. "Stars" Released: 7 October 2002; 2. "Daffodil Lament"/"New New York" Released: 2003, promo

Professional ratings
Review scores
Source	Rating
AllMusic	4.5/5 stars

Stars: The Best of 1992–2002 is a compilation album and DVD from the Irish band the Cranberries, released in 2002 by Island Records. Some of the tracks on the album are different versions of the songs provided in earlier albums. The album also contains two new tracks: "New New York" and "Stars".

The first 17 tracks contain all of the band's singles through 2002 in chronological order.

== Track listing ==
All lyrics by Dolores O'Riordan. All music by Dolores O'Riordan and Noel Hogan, unless otherwise noted.

Stars: The Best of 1992–2002 track listing
No.	Title	Music	Original album	Length
1.	"Dreams" (radio edit)		Everybody Else Is Doing It, So Why Can't We? (1993)	4:15
2.	"Linger"		Everybody Else Is Doing It, So Why Can't We?	4:34
3.	"Zombie"	O'Riordan	No Need to Argue (1994)	5:06
4.	"Ode to My Family"		No Need to Argue	4:30
5.	"I Can't Be with You"		No Need to Argue	3:07
6.	"Ridiculous Thoughts" (radio edit)		No Need to Argue	3:36
7.	"Salvation"		To the Faithful Departed (1996)	2:24
8.	"Free to Decide" (alternate mix edit)	O'Riordan	To the Faithful Departed	3:21
9.	"When You're Gone" (radio edit)	O'Riordan	To the Faithful Departed	3:52
10.	"Hollywood" (radio edit)	O'Riordan	To the Faithful Departed	4:17
11.	"Promises" (radio edit)	O'Riordan	Bury the Hatchet (1999)	3:31
12.	"Animal Instinct"		Bury the Hatchet	3:31
13.	"Just My Imagination" (edit)		Bury the Hatchet	3:12
14.	"You & Me" (edit)		Bury the Hatchet	3:16
15.	"Analyse"	O'Riordan	Wake Up and Smell the Coffee (2001)	4:06
16.	"Time Is Ticking Out"		Wake Up and Smell the Coffee	3:01
17.	"This Is the Day"	O'Riordan	Wake Up and Smell the Coffee	4:14
18.	"Daffodil Lament" (bonus track)	O'Riordan	No Need to Argue	6:06
19.	"New New York"		previously unreleased	4:08
20.	"Stars"		previously unreleased	3:31
Total length:				77:05

The limited-edition version of this CD includes five live tracks recorded in Stockholm:

Limited edition bonus CD
No.	Title	Music	Length
1.	"Zombie" (live)	O'Riordan	5:05
2.	"Ode to My Family" (live)		4:20
3.	"Animal Instinct" (live)		3:29
4.	"Salvation" (live)		2:28
5.	"Daffodil Lament" (live)	O'Riordan	4:20
Total length:			19:42

== Awards ==
In 2002, they won an award in Taiwan for best selling international band with the album Stars: The Best of 1992–2002.

== Charts ==
=== Weekly charts ===
2002 weekly chart performance for Stars: The Best of 1992–2002
Chart (2002)	Peak position
Austrian Albums (Ö3 Austria)	16
Belgian Albums (Ultratop Flanders)	11
Belgian Albums (Ultratop Wallonia)	3
Canada Albums (Nielsen Soundscan)	21
Dutch Albums (Album Top 100)	31
German Albums (Offizielle Top 100)	23
Irish Albums (IRMA)	4
Italian Albums (FIMI)	3
Norwegian Albums (VG-lista)	6
Portuguese Albums (AFP)	1
Singaporean Albums (RIAS)	2
Swedish Albums (Sverigetopplistan)	37
Swiss Albums (Schweizer Hitparade)	4

2006 weekly chart performance for Stars: The Best of 1992–2002
Chart (2006)	Peak position
Spanish Albums (Promusicae)	52

2018 weekly chart performance for Stars: The Best of 1992–2002
Chart (2018)	Peak position
Australian Albums (ARIA)	8
Czech Albums (ČNS IFPI)	19
Italian Albums (Musica e Dischi)	16
Portuguese Albums (AFP)	27
New Zealand Albums (RMNZ)	13
UK Albums (Official Charts)	16
US Billboard 200	16
US Top Alternative Albums (Billboard)	2
US Top Rock Albums (Billboard)	3

2024 weekly chart performance for Stars: The Best of 1992–2002
Chart (2024)	Peak position
Greek Albums (IFPI)	18

=== Year-end charts ===
2002 year-end chart performance for Stars: The Best of 1992–2002
Chart (2002)	Position
Canadian Alternative Albums (Nielsen SoundScan)	128
Swiss Albums (Schweizer Hitparade)	67

== Certifications ==
Certifications and sales for Stars: The Best of 1992–2002
Region	Certification	Certified units/sales
Argentina (CAPIF)	Gold	20,000^{^}
Australia (ARIA)	Gold	35,000^{^}
Denmark (IFPI Danmark)	Gold	10,000^{‡}
Germany (BVMI)	Gold	150,000^{‡}
Italy (FIMI)	Gold	25,000^{‡}
Mexico (AMPROFON) video	Gold	10,000^{^}
New Zealand (RMNZ)	Platinum	15,000^{‡}
Spain (Promusicae)	Platinum	100,000^{^}
Switzerland (IFPI Switzerland)	Gold	20,000^{^}
United Kingdom (BPI)	Platinum	300,000^{‡}
United States	—	538,000
Summaries
Europe (IFPI)	Platinum	1,000,000^{*}
^{*} Sales figures based on certification alone.^{^} Shipments figures based on certification alone.^{‡} Sales+streaming figures based on certification alone.

== DVD ==
Stars: The Best of Videos 1992–2002

Video by The Cranberries
- Released: 26 November 2002
- Recorded: Various
- Genre: Alternative rock
- Label: Island

The Cranberries video chronology
Beneath the Skin – Live in Paris (2001)	Stars: The Best of Videos 1992–2002 (2002)

Stars: The Best of Videos 1992–2002 is a DVD album by Irish rock band The Cranberries. It compiles 17 of the band's promotional videos including their new single "Stars", along with alternate takes and live recordings of several songs and a documentary entitled 99 Love Life & Rock 'n' Roll.

1. "Dreams" (Everybody Else Is Doing It, So Why Can't We?, September 1992)
  - Director: Peter Scammell
2. "Linger" (Everybody Else Is Doing It, So Why Can't We?, February 1993)
  - Director: Melodie McDaniel
3. "Zombie" (No Need to Argue, September 1994)
  - Director: Samuel Bayer
4. "Ode to My Family" (No Need to Argue, November 1994)
  - Director: Samuel Bayer
5. "I Can't Be with You" (No Need to Argue, February 1995)
  - Director: Samuel Bayer
6. "Ridiculous Thoughts" (No Need to Argue, July 1995)
  - Director: Freckles Flynn
7. "Salvation" (To the Faithful Departed, April 1996)
  - Director: Olivier Dahan
8. "Free to Decide" (To the Faithful Departed, August 1996)
  - Director: Marty Callner
9. "When You're Gone" (To the Faithful Departed, November 1996)
  - Director: Karen Bellone
10. "Promises" (Bury the Hatchet, March 1999)
  - Director: Olivier Dahan
11. "Animal Instinct" (Bury the Hatchet, July 1999)
  - Director: Olivier Dahan
12. "Just My Imagination" (Bury the Hatchet, September 1999)
  - Director: Phil Harder
13. "You and Me" (Bury the Hatchet, March 2000)
  - Director: Maurice Linnane
14. "Analyse" (Wake Up and Smell the Coffee, September 2001)
  - Director: Keir McFarlane
15. "Time Is Ticking Out" (Wake Up and Smell the Coffee, March 2002)
  - Director: Maurice Linnane
16. "This Is the Day" (Wake Up and Smell the Coffee, June 2002)
  - Director: Olivier Dahan
17. "Stars" (Stars: The Best of 1992–2002, October 2002)
  - Director: Jake Nava

=== Alternate takes ===
- "Dreams"
- "Ridiculous Thoughts"
- "When You're Gone"
- "Analyse"

=== Live favorites ===
- "Daffodil Lament" ('94 Astoria UK)
- "Empty" ('94 Astoria)
- "Sunday" ('96 tour)

=== Live at Vicar Street ===
- "Time Is Ticking Out"
- "Linger"
- "In the Ghetto"
- "Ode to My Family"
- "Shattered"
- "Animal Instinct"
- "Loud and Clear"
- "I Can't Be with You"
- "Analyse"

=== '99 Love Life & Rock 'n' Roll ===
Also on the DVD is a 26-minute documentary entitled '99 Love Life & Rock 'n' Roll and directed by Ciaran Donnelly. In it, the band members speak about their career, expectations for the future, and how some songs were composed, like "Linger" and "Zombie".
