= Beneath the Skin – Live in Paris =

2001 live album by the Cranberries

Video by The Cranberries
- Released: 2 January 2001
- Recorded: 9 December 1999
- Venue: Palais Omnisports de Paris-Bercy
- Genre: Rock
- Length: 84 minutes
- Label: Image Entertainment
- Director: Maurice Linnane
- Producer: Ned O'Hanlon

The Cranberries video chronology
Live (1994)	Beneath the Skin – Live in Paris (2001)	Stars: The Best of Videos 1992–2002 (2002)

Professional ratings
Review scores
Source	Rating
Allmusic	4/5 stars

Beneath the Skin – Live in Paris is a concert video by Irish rock band The Cranberries from their "Bury the Hatchet" tour. Recorded on 9 December 1999 at the Palais Omnisports de Paris-Bercy on the band's stop in Paris, France, it was released on DVD in January 2001.

The DVD includes documentaries of the band and technicians, promotional videos for the singles from Bury the Hatchet ("Promises", "Animal Instinct", and "Just My Imagination") and live performances of "How" (1993), "Yesterday's Gone" (MTV Unplugged, 1995), "Hollywood" (1996) and "Saving Grace" (1999).

The DVD features the concert in Dolby Digital Stereo and Dolby Digital DTS 5.1 audio formats.

== Track listing ==
1. "Promises"
2. "Animal Instinct"
3. "Loud and Clear"
4. "Ode to My Family"
5. "The Icicle Melts"
6. "Linger"
7. "Wanted"
8. "Salvation"
9. "Desperate Andy"
10. "Go Your Own Way" (Fleetwood Mac cover)
11. "Pretty"
12. "When You're Gone"
13. "I Can't Be With You"
14. "Waltzing Back"
15. "Free to Decide"
16. "Zombie"
17. "Ridiculous Thoughts"
18. "Dying in the Sun"
19. "You and Me"
20. "Just My Imagination"
21. "Delilah"
22. "Dreams"

== Chart performance ==
In 2001, Beneath the Skin – Live in Paris peaked at number 2 in the Netherlands.
