= Bualadh Bos – The Cranberries Live =

Live album by The Cranberries
- Released: 10 November 2009
- Recorded: 1994–1998
- Genre: Alternative rock
- Length: 59:11
- Label: Island
- Producer: The Cranberries

The Cranberries chronology
Gold (2008)	Bualadh Bos – The Cranberries Live (2009)	Roses (2012)

Bualadh Bos (English: Clap your Hands) – The Cranberries Live is a live album from the Irish band The Cranberries, released by Island Records on 10 November 2009.

== Critical reception ==
Editors at AllMusic rated this album 4 out of 5 stars, with critic Mark Deming writing that this album has "the group performing most of their best-known songs for enthusiastic fans".

== Track listing ==
Bualadh Bos – The Cranberries Live track listing
No.	Title	Length
1.	"Wanted"	2:05
2.	"Liar"	2:49
3.	"Linger"	5:16
4.	"I Still Do"	3:17
5.	"Waltzing Back"	3:50
6.	"Not Sorry"	4:35
7.	"Pretty"	2:15
8.	"Forever Yellow Skies"	4:49
9.	"Free to Decide"	3:13
10.	"Sunday"	3:27
11.	"Ode to My Family"	4:36
12.	"Ridiculous Thoughts"	4:18
13.	"Zombie"	5:07
14.	"Promises"	5:02
15.	"Dreams"	4:25
Total length:		59:11

== Chart performance ==
Bualadh Bos – The Cranberries Live peaked at #29 in Greece and #99 in Mexico.
