= Stars (The Cranberries song) =

2002 song by The Cranberries

Single by The Cranberries

from the album Stars: The Best of 1992–2002
- Released: 7 October 2002
- Recorded: 3–6 June 2002
- Studio: Criteria Hit Factory, Miami
- Genre: Pop rock
- Length: 3:30
- Label: Island
- Composers: Dolores O'Riordan; Noel Hogan
- Lyricist: Dolores O'Riordan
- Producer: Stephen Street

The Cranberries singles chronology
"This Is the Day" (2002)	"Stars" (2002)	"Tomorrow" (2011)

"Stars" is a song by the Cranberries from the compilation album Stars: The Best of 1992–2002, and was released in October 2002. It is the band's last single released before their six-year hiatus. The music video was directed by Jake Nava.

== Track listing ==
1. "Stars" – 3:30
2. "Dreaming My Dreams" – 3:37
3. "Sunday" – 3:30
4. "Hollywood" – 5:08

== Personnel ==
- Dolores O'Riordan – lead vocals, guitars
- Noel Hogan – lead guitars
- Mike Hogan – bass guitar
- Fergal Lawler – drums, percussion

== Charts ==
Weekly chart performance for "Stars"
Chart (2002)	Peak position
Italy (FIMI)	22
