= Uncertain =

Uncertain may refer to:

- Uncertain, Texas, a town in the United States
- Uncertain (album), 1991 album of The Cranberries
- Uncertain, a music project of Florian-Ayala Fauna
- Hoplodrina octogenaria, a moth of Europe and Asia

== See also ==
- Uncertainty – not able to be relied on or lack of confidence
