= Uncertain (EP) =

1991 EP by the Cranberries

EP by The Cranberries
- Released: 28 October 1991
- Studios: Xeric Studios, Limerick, Ireland
- Genres: Indie rock; indie pop; alternative rock
- Length: 14:16
- Label: Xeric Records (XER-014)
- Producer: Pearse Gilmore

The Cranberries chronology
Nothing Left at All (1990)	Uncertain (1991)	Everybody Else Is Doing It, So Why Can't We? (1993)

Uncertain is the first EP by the Irish band the Cranberries. The EP was released in the autumn of 1991, with the band having previously released cassette EPs under the name The Cranberry Saw Us. Uncertain was released by Island under the Xeric Records name on both CD and 12" vinyl formats. Approximately 5,000 total copies of Uncertain were produced. Guitarist Noel Hogan said of the album that producer Pearse Gilmore "cluttered the mixes with dance beats and industrial-style guitar", which resulted from a conflictual relationship between the group and Gilmore. The EP peaked at number 118 on the UK Singles Chart

An unreleased music video was made for the main theme "Uncertain"; a brief part of the clip was included on their DVD compilation, Stars: The Best of 1992–2002. The unedited complete video clip appeared for the first time on YouTube on 14 April 2020, and shows a young Dolores O'Riordan, with her brother Brendan and his daughter Cora, recalling her days as a child in an Irish forest.

== Television performance ==
After the release of 'Uncertain', The Cranberries appeared on the Irish television show "On The Waterfront" which was hosted by Robert Arkins and Felim Gormley from The Commitments. They performed "Linger", which was recorded and was broadcast in 1992.

== Track listing ==
All lyrics are written by Dolores O'Riordan; all music is composed by the Cranberries.

No.	Title	Length
1.	"Uncertain"	3:07
2.	"Nothing Left at All"	3:55
3.	"Pathetic Senses"	3:37
4.	"Them"	3:42
Total length:		14:16

== Personnel ==
Personnel taken from Uncertain liner notes.

The Cranberries

- Fergal Lawler – drums, percussion
- Mike Hogan – bass
- Noel Hogan – guitar, backing vocals
- Dolores O'Riordan – vocals

Additional personnel

- Mike Mahoney – sounds ("Them")
- Brendan O'Riordan – backing vocals ("Uncertain")
- Pearse Gilmore – production, recording, mixing
- Shane Mc'Carthy – sleeve photograph
- Cally (Martin Callomon) – art direction
