= Dreaming My Dreams =

Dreaming My Dreams or Dreamin' My Dreams may refer to:

- Dreamin' My Dreams (Marianne Faithfull album), 1976
  - or the title song
- Dreamin' My Dreams (Patty Loveless album), 2005
  - or the cover of the song "Dreaming My Dreams with You" by Allen Reynolds
- Dreaming My Dreams (Waylon Jennings album), 1975
  - or the song "Dreaming My Dreams with You" written for Jennings
- "Dreaming My Dreams" (The Cranberries song), 1995
