= Beneath the Skin =

Beneath the Skin may refer to:

- Beneath the Skin (Collide album)
- Beneath the Skin (Of Monsters and Men album)
- Beneath the Skin – Live in Paris, a 2001 concert video by the Cranberries
- Beneath the Skin (film), a 1981 short film created by Cecelia Condit
