= Something Else (The Cranberries album) =

Studio album by The Cranberries
- Released: 28 April 2017
- Genres: Acoustic rock, alternative rock
- Length: 54:22
- Label: BMG
- Producer: The Cranberries

The Cranberries chronology
Roses (2012)	Something Else (2017)	In the End (2019)

Singles from Something Else
- 1. "Linger" Released: 16 March 2017; 2. "Why?" Released: 16 March 2017

Something Else is the seventh studio album by Irish alternative rock band the Cranberries, released on 28 April 2017, through BMG. The album, which features "unplugged" and orchestral versions of 10 previously released singles and three new songs, was recorded at the Irish Chamber Orchestra Building, the University of Limerick, Ireland. The album cover is a re-enactment of the front cover image of the band's 1994 album No Need to Argue with the four members each in very similar positions. The backdrop, however, is a darker green as opposed to No Need to Argue's stark white and the band is sitting on a different sofa.

The lead single from the album, an acoustic version of the band's 1993 hit "Linger", was released on 16 March 2017. The same day "Why?" was also released.

Something Else is the band's final album released during lead singer Dolores O'Riordan's lifetime.

== Critical reception ==
Professional ratings
Review scores
Source	Rating
AllMusic	3.5/5 stars
Consequence of Sound	C+
Knoxville News Sentinel	3.5/5 stars

Something Else received mostly positive reviews from music critics. Neil Z. Yeung of AllMusic rated the album three and half out of five stars and states, "Something Else is worthwhile for the faithful, offering new spins on songs that they likely know by heart, and is an easily digestible snapshot of their 20th century output for those in need of a reminder of the beloved Limerick group's legacy."

Matt the Raven of Under the Radar viewed that it presents Something Else in two styles,

"There are two other stand out features here that make listening a worthwhile endeavor. One is the tracklisting. The Cranberries actually picked their best tunes, something that doesn't usually happen with these types of projects. The other is Dolores O'Riordan's vocals. Re-recorded for this album, her voice is as radiant and emotionally powerful as ever, with an elegance that keeps even the weaker tracks afloat".

== Track listing ==
All lyrics are written by Dolores O'Riordan; all music is composed by O'Riordan and Noel Hogan, except where noted.

No.	Title	Music	Length
1.	"Linger" (acoustic version)		4:55
2.	"The Glory"		5:14
3.	"Dreams" (acoustic version)		4:24
4.	"When You're Gone" (acoustic version)	O'Riordan	4:10
5.	"Zombie" (acoustic version)	O'Riordan	4:01
6.	"Ridiculous Thoughts" (acoustic version)		3:07
7.	"Rupture"	O'Riordan	4:16
8.	"Ode to My Family" (acoustic version)		4:43
9.	"Free to Decide" (acoustic version)	O'Riordan	3:17
10.	"Just My Imagination" (acoustic version)		4:02
11.	"Animal Instinct" (acoustic version)		3:39
12.	"You & Me" (acoustic version)		3:33
13.	"Why?"	O'Riordan	5:01
Total length:			54:22

== Personnel ==
The Cranberries

- Dolores O'Riordan – vocals, rhythm guitar
- Noel Hogan – lead guitar
- Mike Hogan – bass guitar
- Fergal Lawler – drums, percussion

Additional musicians

- Kenneth Rice – violin, string arrangements (all tracks)
- Oonagh Keogh – violin on "Linger", "Dreams", "When You're Gone", "Zombie", "Ridiculous Thoughts", "Ode to My Family", "Free to Decide", "Just My Imagination", "Animal Instinct", and "You & Me"
- Karen Devran – viola on "Linger", "The Glory", "When You're Gone", "Ode to My Family", "Free to Decide", "Just My Imagination", "Animal Instinct", and "You & Me"
- Richard Angel – cello on "Linger", "Dreams", "When You're Gone", "Zombie", "Ridiculous Thoughts", "Ode to My Family", "Free to Decide", "Just My Imagination", "Animal Instinct", and "You & Me"
- Orla Ni Bhraoin – violin on "The Glory"
- Ailbhe McDonagh – cello on "The Glory", "Rapture", and "Why?"
- Cian O'Duill – viola on "Dreams", "Zombie", and "Ridiculous Thoughts"
- Dan Brodbeck – guitar on "Why?" and "Rapture"
- Corey Thompson – drums on "Why?" and "Rapture"

Production

- The Cranberries – production
- Tim Martin – engineering
- Cenzo Townshend – mixing
- Oleg Koretsky – vocal engineering (all except "Why?" and "Rapture")
- Dan Brodbeck – vocal, guitar, and drum engineering on "Why?" and "Rapture"
- Mike Gavin – additional engineering
- Dave Keary – additional engineering
- Miles Showell – mastering

== Charts ==
Chart (2017)	Peak position
Belgian Albums (Ultratop Flanders)	98
Belgian Albums (Ultratop Wallonia)	29
Canadian Albums (Billboard)	96
Czech Albums (ČNS IFPI)	24
French Albums (SNEP)	55
German Albums (Offizielle Top 100)	60
Irish Albums (IRMA)	17
Italian Albums (FIMI)	9
New Zealand Heatseekers Albums (RMNZ)	8
Scottish Albums (Official Charts)	12
Spanish Albums (PROMUSICAE)	45
Swiss Albums (Schweizer Hitparade)	43
UK Albums (Official Charts)	18
UK Album Downloads (Official Charts)	25
UK Independent Albums (Official Charts)	3
US Independent Albums (Billboard)	5

Chart (2018)	Peak position
Spanish Albums (PROMUSICAE)	33
US Independent Albums (Billboard)	8
US Top Rock Albums (Billboard)	50

== Release history ==
Region	Date	Format(s)	Label
Worldwide	28 April 2017	CD; LP; digital download	BMG
