= Animal Instinct (The Cranberries song) =

1999 single by the Cranberries

Single by the Cranberries

from the album Bury the Hatchet
- B-side: "Paparazzi on Mopeds", "Baby Blues"
- Released: 29 June 1999
- Length: 3:31
- Label: Island, Mercury
- Songwriters: Dolores O'Riordan, Noel Hogan
- Producers: Benedict Fenner, the Cranberries

The Cranberries singles chronology
"Promises" (1999)	"Animal Instinct" (1999)	"Just My Imagination" (1999)

"Animal Instinct" is a song by Irish rock band the Cranberries. It was released as the second single from the band's fourth album, Bury the Hatchet, in June 1999. The single became the band's first single to miss the UK top 40 (excluding the original chart position of "Linger"), charting at number 54. A music video, directed by Olivier Dahan, was released to promote the single. In 2017, the song was released as an acoustic, stripped-down version on the band's Something Else album.

== Track listings ==
CD single 1 (UK)

1. "Animal Instinct" – 3:31
2. "Paparazzi on Mopeds" – 4:32
3. "Ode to My Family" (live, Hamburg '99) – 4:30

CD single 2 (UK)

1. "Animal Instinct" – 3:31
2. "Baby Blues" – 2:38
3. "Salvation" (live, Hamburg '99) – 2:38

Maxi-single

1. "Animal Instinct" – 3:31
2. "Paparazzi on Mopeds" – 4:32
3. "Ode to My Family" (live, Hamburg '99) – 4:30
4. "Salvation" (live, Hamburg '99) – 2:38

French limited-edition CD single

1. "Animal Instinct" – 3:31
2. "Dreams" (live, Oslo '99) – 4:12
3. "Linger" (live, Oslo '99) – 4:40
4. "Zombie" (live, Tipperary '94) – 5:21

== Charts ==
Weekly chart performance for "Animal Instinct"
Chart (1999)	Peak position
France (SNEP)	55
Germany (GfK)	72
Italy (Musica e dischi)	34
Italy Airplay (Music & Media)	3
Netherlands (Dutch Top 40 Tipparade)	12
Netherlands (Single Top 100)	79
Scotland Singles (OCC)	56
UK Singles (OCC)	54

== Release history ==
Release dates and formats for "Animal Instinct"
Region	Date	Format(s)	Label(s)	Ref.
United States	June 1999	Modern adult contemporary; hot adult contemporary radio	Island	
Canada	29 June 1999	CD	Island	
United Kingdom	5 July 1999	CD; cassette	Island; Mercury	
Japan	7 July 1999	CD	Island	
