= Rachel Bobbitt =

Canadian indie rock musician

Rachel Bobbitt is a Canadian indie rock musician from Nova Scotia.

Bobbitt began her career in 2018. That year, she released her debut EP titled Months to Fall. In 2019, Bobbitt released a collaborative album with hip hop musician Justice Der, titled When This Plane Goes Down..., which was recorded while the two were on summer break during college. Bobbitt released her second EP, And It's The Same, in 2020. On June 15, 2022, Bobbitt released her third EP, titled The Ceiling Could Collapse, and The Ceiling Demos in December 2022. In June 2023, Bobbitt announced her fourth EP. The EP, The Half We Still Have, was released on August 4, 2023. Also in April, Bobbitt shared a cover of Dreams by The Cranberries.

== Discography ==
=== Studio albums ===
Title	Details
When This Plane Goes Down (with Justice Der)	Released: October 25, 2019; Label: Call More
Swimming Towards the Sand	Released: October 17, 2025; Label: Fantasy Records

=== Extended plays ===
Title	Details
Months to Fall	Released: August 1, 2018; Label: Gammawheeler Records
And It's the Same	Released: November 28, 2020; Label: Race Dog
The Ceiling Could Collapse	Released: July 15, 2022; Label: Fantasy Records
The Half We Still Have	Released: August 4, 2023; Label: Fantasy Records
