= Just My Imagination (The Cranberries song) =

1999 single by the Cranberries

Single by the Cranberries

from the album Bury the Hatchet
- B-side: "God Be with You"
- Released: 2 August 1999
- Length: 3:42
- Label: Island
- Songwriters: Dolores O'Riordan, Noel Hogan
- Producers: Benedict Fenner, the Cranberries

The Cranberries singles chronology
"Animal Instinct" (1999)	"Just My Imagination" (1999)	"You and Me" (2000)

Music video
- "Just My Imagination" on YouTube

"Just My Imagination" is a song by Irish band the Cranberries. It was released as the third single from the band's fourth album, Bury the Hatchet, in August 1999. A music video, directed by Phil Harder, was released to promote the single. In 2017, the song was released as a stripped-down acoustic version on the band's Something Else album.

== Track listings ==
2-track CD single

1. "Just My Imagination" – 3:41
2. "God Be with You" – 3:32

"God Be with You" was written by Dolores O'Riordan and produced by O'Riordan and Bruce Fairbairn in 1997. Other members of the band do not appear on that track. The song was originally released for "The Devil's Own" movie soundtrack.

UK CD single 1

1. "Just My Imagination" – 3:41
2. "God Be with You" – 3:32
3. "Zombie" (Live Hamburg '99) – 6:13

This CD1 release was cancelled just before release.

UK CD single 2

1. "Just My Imagination" – 3:41
2. "Such a Shame" – 4:22
3. "Promises" (Live Hamburg '99) – 5:32

This CD2 release was also cancelled just before release. Some copies made it onto the market and are considered quite rare since this release contains the live version of "Promises" from Hamburg '99 which wasn't released on the EU- 4-track single.

European maxi single

1. "Just My Imagination" – 3:41
2. "God Be with You" – 3:32
3. "Such a Shame" – 4:22
4. "Zombie" (live Hamburg '99) – 6:13

Special limited-edition Italian tour CD single

1. "Just My Imagination" – 3:41
2. "Dreams" (live at Radio 105 Network, Palalido, Milano, Italia) – 4:35
3. "Ode to My Family" (live at Radio 105 Network, Palalido, Milano, Italia) – 4:34
4. "Animal Instinct" (live at Radio 105 Network, Palalido, Milano, Italia) – 3:42

== Charts ==
Weekly chart performance
Chart (1999–2000)	Peak position
Belgium (Ultratip Bubbling Under Flanders)	10
Croatia (HRT)	9
European Radio Top 50 (Music & Media)	23
France (SNEP)	71
Germany (GfK)	77
Iceland (Íslenski Listinn Topp 40)	2
Italy (FIMI)	13

Chart (2018)	Peak position
Italy (FIMI)	95

== Certifications ==
Certifications and sales
Region	Certification	Certified units/sales
Italy (FIMI)	Gold	50,000^{‡}
^{‡} Sales+streaming figures based on certification alone.

== Release history ==
Release dates and formats
Region	Date	Format(s)	Label(s)	Ref.
United States	2 August 1999	Hot adult contemporary; modern adult contemporary radio	Island	
Japan	27 October 1999	CD	Island	
