= In the End (album) =

Studio album by the Cranberries
- Released: 26 April 2019
- Recorded: 2017–2019
- Studios: Bunker Studio and Kore Studios, London, England, United Kingdom
- Genre: Alternative rock
- Length: 42:54
- Label: BMG
- Producer: Stephen Street

The Cranberries chronology
Something Else (2017)	In the End (2019)	Remembering Dolores (2021)

In the End is the eighth and final studio album by Irish alternative rock band the Cranberries, released on 26 April 2019 by BMG. It is the band's only release since the death of singer Dolores O'Riordan, whose vocals are featured posthumously. The surviving instrumentalists pieced together her demos with in-studio recordings over the course of the subsequent year and worked with long-time producer Stephen Street to finalise the album. Critical reception was positive.

== Recording and release ==
Guitarist Noel Hogan and vocalist Dolores O'Riordan began composing songs for the album while on tour in May 2017; the first track that Hogan wrote was "A Place I Know" while touring in Poland. The band ended up canceling several North American tour dates when O'Riordan suffered a herniated disc. That June, Hogan spent time in France writing and sending his demos to O'Riordan in New York City to add lyrics. Together they wrote and demoed 11 songs that winter, with the final emails from O'Riordan arriving to Hogan hours before she died. The surviving bandmates set aside her vocals for several months following her death and after getting the full support from O'Riordan's family, they brought in Stephen Street—who produced several of their albums—to complete the recording sessions in April and May. The band avoided using pitch correction on O'Riordan's vocals, with Hogan stating: "She would absolutely kill us". Due to some tracks being incomplete, the band brought in backing vocalist Johanna Cranitch, who had toured with the band from 2012 to 2017, to fill in the gaps. By October 2018, the recordings were complete. A month earlier, Noel Hogan confirmed that the Cranberries moniker would be retired after the album's release.

The album’s cover image was taken by the band’s original photographer Andy Earl and sleeve designer Cally Calloman. On the first anniversary of O'Riordan's death, "All Over Now" was released as a streaming advance single. The song debuted at 25 on the Adult Alternative Songs. On 1 March, they released "The Pressure" for digital streaming, followed by a music video for "All Over Now" on 7 March. "Wake Me When It's Over" debuted on 19 March. Lastly, the title track was made available on 16 April.

For most of the tracks, the first time they were performed in studio was the only time: the surviving band members did not intend to perform them live and therefore no accompanying tour or promotional performances were held.

== Critical reception ==
Professional ratings
Aggregate scores
Source	Rating
AnyDecentMusic?	7.3/10
Metacritic	77/100
Review scores
Source	Rating
AllMusic	3.5/5 stars
Clash	4/5 stars
Consequence of Sound	B
The Guardian	4/5 stars
The Independent	4/5 stars
The Irish Times	4/5 stars
NME	3/5 stars
Rolling Stone	3.5/5 stars
The Skinny	4/5 stars

Editors at AnyDecentMusic? scored this release a 7.3 out of 10, aggregating 17 reviews. According to the review aggregator Metacritic, In the End received "generally favorable reviews" based on a weighted average score of 77 out of 100 from 12 critic scores. BeatRoute's Jennie Orton gave the album a positive review calling it a fitting end to the band and writing that they, "ha[ve] done a stellar job of embracing the sadness of the material, as if to give themselves and the rest of us a place to put the grief about O'Riordan's pain and how it ultimately got the best of her". In The Irish Times, Eamon Sweeney gave the album four out of five stars, calling it "remarkably uplifting".

Asya Draganova gave the recording three out of five stars, writing for The Arts Desk that it's, "a tribute to the friendship and the shared path of her fellow band members Noel Hogan, Mike Hogan, Fergal Lawler—illustrating well how the four had grown together with their audience over thirty or so years." Writing for NME, Mark Beaumont gave the album three out of five stars, specifically praising O'Riordan's vocals. Charis McGowan of Clash summed up her review, "An album pieced together by a band in mourning, with the sweet sadness of O'Riordan‘s voice layered over, makes it cruder, rawer yet ultimately more truthful and hard-hitting, evoking the charged vulnerability of their very first releases" and gave the release eight out of 10.

== Chart performance ==
In the End placed sixth on the midweek UK Albums Chart, eventually placing at 10th on the full week chart.

== Track listing ==
All lyrics are written by Dolores O'Riordan; all music is composed by O'Riordan and Noel Hogan, except where noted.

In the End track listing
No.	Title	Music	Length
1.	"All Over Now"		4:16
2.	"Lost"	O'Riordan	4:00
3.	"Wake Me When It's Over"	O'Riordan	4:12
4.	"A Place I Know"		4:26
5.	"Catch Me If You Can"	O'Riordan	4:38
6.	"Got It"	O'Riordan	4:02
7.	"Illusion"		4:07
8.	"Crazy Heart"		3:25
9.	"Summer Song"	O'Riordan; Dan Brodbeck	3:34
10.	"The Pressure"		3:22
11.	"In the End"		2:57
Total length:			54:22

Japanese bonus track
No.	Title	Length
12.	"All Over Now (demo)"	4:30
Total length:		58:52

== Personnel ==
The Cranberries

- Noel Hogan – synthesizers, lead guitar, electric guitar, acoustic guitar, mandolin
- Mike Hogan – bass guitar
- Fergal Lawler – percussion, drums
- Dolores O'Riordan – lead and harmony vocals

Additional personnel

- George Apison – audio engineering
- Stefan Baumann – bass clarinet
- Ian Belton – violin
- Alice Bentley – assistant art direction, assistant design
- Dan Brodbeck – guitar, acoustic guitar, piano, samples, loops, vocal engineering
- Cally Calloman – art direction, design
- Johanna Cranitch – backing vocals
- John Davis – audio mastering
- Eoin Devereux – introduction
- Andy Earl – photography
- Louise Fuller – violin
- Sophie Harris – cello
- Mark Knight – audio engineering
- Oleg Koretsky – synthesizer, vocal engineering
- Andy Larkin – assistant art direction, assistant design
- John Metcalfe – viola
- Liam Prior – assistant photography
- Stephen Street – marimba, keyboards, organ, samples, mixing, production

== Charts ==
Chart performance for In the End
Chart (2019)	Peak position
Australian Albums (ARIA)	28
Austrian Albums (Ö3 Austria)	16
Belgian Albums (Ultratop Flanders)	38
Belgian Albums (Ultratop Wallonia)	9
Canadian Albums (Billboard)	34
Czech Albums (ČNS IFPI)	16
Dutch Albums (Album Top 100)	45
French Albums (SNEP)	11
German Albums (Offizielle Top 100)	8
Irish Albums (IRMA)	3
Italian Albums (FIMI)	4
Polish Albums (ZPAV)	25
Portuguese Albums (AFP)	9
Scottish Albums (Official Charts)	7
Spanish Albums (PROMUSICAE)	10
Swiss Albums (Schweizer Hitparade)	5
UK Albums (Official Charts)	10
US Billboard 200	119
US Independent Albums (Billboard)	7
US Top Rock Albums (Billboard)	18
US Top Alternative Albums (Billboard)	10

== Awards ==
Awards for In the End
Year	Organization	Award	Status
2020	62nd Annual Grammy Awards	Best Rock Album	Nominated
