= Dreaming My Dreams (The Cranberries song) =

Promotional single by The Cranberries

from the album No Need To Argue
- Released: November 1995
- Recorded: 1994
- Genre: Acoustic-folk
- Length: 3:37
- Label: Island Records
- Songwriter(s): Dolores O'Riordan
- Producer(s): Stephen Street

"Dreaming My Dreams" is an acoustic folk song from Irish band The Cranberries, taken from their second album, No Need To Argue. It was released as a promotional single in the UK in 1995. According to Billboard magazine, Island Records intended to release the song as the fifth single (fourth in the USA) from the band's second album. Plans for a commercial single and promotional video never materialized, as the band entered into studio to record their third album, To the Faithful Departed, during the same time period.

== Track list ==
Promo single (UK)

1. "Dreaming My Dreams" – 3:37

== Other releases ==
An acoustic version of "Dreaming My Dreams" was released on the "Ode to My Family" single in 1994. The performance was recorded on the BBC television show Later with Jools Holland. A similar version was performed during the band's MTV Unplugged show in 1995. This version was never commercially released.
A live version of the song was released on the "Free to Decide" single in 1996. The performance was recorded at The Point in Dublin, Ireland.
The studio version was also featured on the "Stars" single, taken from the band's 2002 Best Of compilation.
