= Bury the Hatchet (album) =

Studio album by the Cranberries
- Released: 19 April 1999
- Recorded: 1998–1999
- Studios: Metalworks, Mississauga; Windmill Lane, Dublin; Miraval, Correns; Sarm West, London
- Genres: Alternative rock; folk rock; indie pop; jangle pop
- Length: 50:58
- Label: Island
- Producers: The Cranberries; Benedict Fenner

The Cranberries chronology
To the Faithful Departed (1996)	Bury the Hatchet (1999)	Wake Up and Smell the Coffee (2001)

Singles from Bury the Hatchet
- 1. "Promises" Released: 22 March 1999; 2. "Animal Instinct" Released: 29 June 1999; 3. "Just My Imagination" Released: 2 August 1999; 4. "You and Me" Released: 10 March 2000

Professional ratings
Review scores
Source	Rating
AllMusic	4/5 stars
The A.V. Club	(unfavourable)
Chicago Tribune	(unfavourable)
Christgau's Consumer Guide	(2-star Honorable Mention)
Entertainment Weekly	D
Los Angeles Times	2/4 stars
Rolling Stone	3/5 stars
Sputnikmusic	3.5/5 stars
USA Today	2.5/4 stars
Wall of Sound	72/100

Bury the Hatchet is the fourth studio album by Irish alternative rock band the Cranberries, released on 19 April 1999. In the US, the album had shipped 500,000 copies as of 2 June 1999, and received a gold certification.

The album is the first album released by the band after their first hiatus, which began in September 1996. Dolores O'Riordan had taken that time to heal from stress-induced diseases, and also had her first child, Taylor, during this period. This last fact influenced some of the tracks on the album, most notably "Animal Instinct" and "You and Me".

The themes of the songs vary from maternity and children to divorce and child abuse.

== Album cover ==
The album cover, which was designed by Storm Thorgerson, depicts a naked man being watched by a giant eye in a barren landscape. The picture was taken in Oljato-Monument Valley, Arizona. The vinyl edition's cover differs, with the nude man and the giant eye in an alternate desert setting, but the original cover pictures are used on the record labels. The back cover shows the man turned around, shouting at the eye.

The album cover was later featured on Pitchfork's list of "The Worst Record Covers of All Time", which stated "Storm Thorgerson's artwork fluctuates between the iconic and the inane. This one falls into the latter category."

Thorgerson also designed the cover for the band's 2001 album Wake Up and Smell the Coffee.

== Track listing ==
=== CD ===
All lyrics are written by Dolores O'Riordan; all music is composed by O'Riordan and Noel Hogan except tracks 3, 8, 10, 13 and 14 by O'Riordan.

No.	Title	Length
1.	"Animal Instinct"	3:31
2.	"Loud and Clear"	2:45
3.	"Promises"	5:27
4.	"You and Me"	3:35
5.	"Just My Imagination"	3:41
6.	"Shattered"	3:42
7.	"Desperate Andy"	3:44
8.	"Saving Grace"	3:08
9.	"Copycat"	2:53
10.	"What's on My Mind"	3:12
11.	"Delilah"	3:32
12.	"Fee Fi Fo"	4:47
13.	"Dying in the Sun"	3:32
14.	"Sorry Son"	3:25
Total length:		50:58

1999 limited edition [CD 2]
No.	Title	Length
1.	"Promises" (live – Oslo '98)	5:08
2.	"Dreams" (live – Oslo '98)	4:12
3.	"Linger" (live – Oslo '98)	4:40
4.	"Zombie" (live – Tipperary '94)	5:21

2002 Complete Sessions Edition
No.	Title	Length
15.	"Baby Blues"	2:38
16.	"Sweetest Thing"	3:34
17.	"Woman Without Pride"	2:26
18.	"Such a Shame"	4:23
19.	"Paparazzi on Mopeds"	4:33
Total length:		68:40

2000 Complete Sessions Edition [CD 2]
No.	Title	Length
1.	"Baby Blues"	2:39
2.	"Sweetest Thing"	3:34
3.	"Woman Without Pride"	2:26
4.	"Such a Shame"	4:23
5.	"Paparazzi on Mopeds"	4:34
6.	"Promises" (live in Paris '99)	4:18
7.	"Animal Instinct" (live in Paris '99)	3:55
8.	"Loud and Clear" (live in Paris '99)	2:45
9.	"You and Me" (live in Paris '99)	3:37
10.	"Shattered" (live in Hamburg '99)	3:54
11.	"Desperate Andy" (live in Paris '99)	3:56
12.	"Delilah" (live in Paris '99)	3:21

=== Vinyl ===
The vinyl version features a different track order (this is retained on the 2015 reissue).

Side A
No.	Title	Length
1.	"Animal Instinct"	3:31
2.	"Desperate Andy"	3:44
3.	"Saving Grace"	3:08
Total length:		10:23

Side B
No.	Title	Length
1.	"You and Me"	3:35
2.	"Loud and Clear"	2:45
3.	"Just My Imagination"	3:41
4.	"Shattered"	3:42
Total length:		13:43

Side C
No.	Title	Length
1.	"What's on My Mind"	3:12
2.	"Copycat"	2:53
3.	"Fee Fi Fo"	4:47
Total length:		10:52

Side D
No.	Title	Length
1.	"Delilah"	3:32
2.	"Promises"	5:27
3.	"Sorry Son"	3:25
4.	"Dying in the Sun"	3:32
Total length:		15:56

== Personnel ==
Personnel taken from Bury the Hatchet liner notes.

The Cranberries

- Dolores O'Riordan Burton – vocals, guitar, keyboards
- Noel Hogan – electric & acoustic guitars
- Mike Hogan – bass guitar
- Fergal Lawler – drums, percussion

Production

- The Cranberries – production
- Benedict Fenner – production, engineering
- Mike Plotnikoff – mixing

== Charts ==
=== Weekly charts ===
Weekly chart performance for Bury the Hatchet
Chart (1999–2000)	Peak position
Australian Albums (ARIA)	11
Austrian Albums (Ö3 Austria)	2
Belgian Albums (Ultratop Flanders)	11
Belgian Albums (Ultratop Wallonia)	7
Canadian Albums (Billboard)	1
Dutch Albums (Album Top 100)	9
European Albums (Billboard)	1
Finnish Albums (Suomen virallinen lista)	4
French Albums (SNEP)	2
German Albums (Offizielle Top 100)	1
Hungarian Albums (MAHASZ)	21
Irish Albums (IRMA)	4
Italian Albums (FIMI)	2
New Zealand Albums (RMNZ)	6
Norwegian Albums (VG-lista)	4
Singaporean Albums (SPVA)	1
Spanish Albums (AFYVE)	1
Swedish Albums (Sverigetopplistan)	4
Swiss Albums (Schweizer Hitparade)	1
Taiwanese International Albums (IFPI)	1
UK Albums (Official Charts)	7
US Billboard 200	13

Chart (2024)	Peak position
Greek Albums (IFPI)	37

=== Year-end charts ===
1999 year-end chart performance for Bury the Hatchet
Chart (1999)	Position
Austrian Albums (Ö3 Austria)	35
Belgian Albums (Ultratop Flanders)	75
Belgian Albums (Ultratop Wallonia)	30
Dutch Albums (Album Top 100)	69
French Albums (SNEP)	24
German Albums (Offizielle Top 100)	26
Italian Albums (FIMI)	11
Spanish Albums (AFYPE)	17
Swiss Albums (Schweizer Hitparade)	36

== Certifications and sales ==
Certifications and sales for Bury the Hatchet
Region	Certification	Certified units/sales
Austria (IFPI Austria)	Gold	25,000^{*}
Canada (Music Canada)	Platinum	100,000^{^}
France (SNEP)	Platinum	300,000^{*}
Germany (BVMI)	Gold	250,000^{^}
Ireland (IRMA)	Platinum	15,000^{^}
Italy (FIMI) sales in 1999	Platinum	250,000
Italy (FIMI) sales since 2009	Gold	25,000^{‡}
Japan (RIAJ)	Gold	100,000^{^}
Mexico (AMPROFON)	Gold	75,000^{^}
Poland (ZPAV)	Gold	50,000^{*}
Spain (Promusicae)	2× Platinum	200,000^{^}
Switzerland (IFPI Switzerland)	Platinum	50,000^{^}
United Kingdom (BPI)	Silver	60,000^{^}
United States (RIAA)	Gold	500,000^{^}
Summaries
Europe (IFPI)	Platinum	1,000,000^{*}
Worldwide	—	2,300,000
^{*} Sales figures based on certification alone.^{^} Shipments figures based on certification alone.^{‡} Sales+streaming figures based on certification alone.
