= Everybody Else Is Doing It, So Why Can't We? =

Studio album by The Cranberries
- Released: 1 March 1993
- Recorded: 1992–1993
- Studios: Windmill Lane (Dublin); Surrey Sound (Leatherhead) (Note: "Not Sorry")
- Genres: Alternative rock; indie pop; Irish folk; jangle pop; post-punk; dream pop
- Length: 40:54
- Label: Island
- Producer: Stephen Street

The Cranberries chronology
Uncertain (1991)	Everybody Else Is Doing It, So Why Can't We? (1993)	No Need to Argue (1994)

Singles from Everybody Else Is Doing It, So Why Can't We?
- 1. "Dreams" Released: 5 October 1992; 2. "Linger" Released: 15 February 1993

Everybody Else Is Doing It, So Why Can't We? is the debut studio album by Irish alternative rock band the Cranberries. Released on 1 March 1993 through Island Records after four EPs, it is both the band's first full-length album and major label release. The album was written entirely by the band's lead singer Dolores O'Riordan and guitarist Noel Hogan and contains the band's highest charting US single, "Linger". Everybody Else Is Doing It, So Why Can't We? was a commercial success, reaching number one on both the UK and Irish albums charts. On 24 June 1994, it became the fifth album in rock history to reach number one on the UK Albums Chart more than a year after its release.

On 7 March 2018, the band's three remaining members announced a special 25th anniversary newly remastered anniversary edition of the album, with previously unreleased material as well as other bonus material from the era of the album. However, it was delayed until late 2018, following the death of O'Riordan.

== Release ==
The song "Sunday" was released as a promotional single in the US in 1993, before Island Records decided to opt for a re-release of the band's first two European singles, "Dreams" and "Linger", in 1994.

A demo version of "Sunday" was featured on the band's 1990 EP cassette Water Circle. An acoustic version was released on the KCRW 1995 compilation Rare on Air, Volume 2. A live version of "Sunday" was included on one of the band's "Free to Decide" single. The performance was recorded at The Point in Dublin, Ireland, on 2 June 1995. Another live version was featured on the band's live compilation Bualadh Bos, released in 2010. The performance was recorded at Pine Knob in Clarkston, Michigan, on 18 August 1996 during the Free to Decide World Tour.

== Critical reception ==
Professional ratings
Review scores
Source	Rating
AllMusic	4.5/5 stars
Entertainment Weekly	B
The Irish Times	4/5 stars
Los Angeles Times	3/4 stars
NME	6/10
Pitchfork	8.5/10
Q	4/5 stars
The Rolling Stone Album Guide	4/5 stars
Select	3/5 medals
Slant Magazine	4/5 stars
The Village Voice	A−

Everybody Else Is Doing It, So Why Can't We? received generally positive reviews from music critics. Ned Raggett of AllMusic praised O’Riordan’s “undisputed vocal ability”, writing "the two best cuts were the deserved smashes: 'Dreams,' a brisk, charging number combining low-key tension and full-on rock, and the melancholic, string-swept break-up song 'Linger.'" Writing for Sputnikmusic, the reviewer lauded the release as an "excellent" alternative rock record and a "very superb debut", noting that through its "calm, laidback, nostalgic moods, it creates a very likeable atmosphere." Mario Munoz of the Los Angeles Times wrote, "O’Riordan’s arresting voice is the driving instrument in this beautifully understated debut, painting stark and vivid images of pain and self-denial executed with confessional, hymn-like humility." Writing for Q, the reviewer described the album as featuring "softly stroked guitars tenderized by a female voice of exceptional merit" and noted its "deliciously spine-shivering moments" where "the melodies are festooned with dreamy hooks."

In contemporary reviews, Tom Sinclair of Entertainment Weekly wrote that "over time singer O'Riordan's breathy vocals and the band's subtle melodies begin to seduce," and called the band "Quiet storm for the alternative-rock generation." Reviewing the album's 2018 anniversary edition for The Irish Times, Eamon Sweeney described the record as "still spellbinding after all these years," pointing to its "very distinctly Irish take on guitar-based indie pop in the early 1990s." Sal Cinquemani of Slant Magazine offered a retrospective assessment, observing that the collection is "filled with succinct, pretty songs about timeless lovelorn truths." Quinn Moreland of Pitchfork described the album as a "showcase for Dolores O’Riordan’s disarming songwriting and immaculate voice." Moreland also highlighted the widespread cultural legacy and media influence of the album tracks. Within a year of the record's release, "Dreams" became the anthem for the character Angela Chase on the television series My So-Called Life. "Linger" was later featured during a romantic flashback scene in the 2006 comedy film Click. Additionally, a Cantonese cover of "Dreams" recorded by Faye Wong appeared in the 1994 Wong Kar-wai film Chungking Express, subsequently becoming a highly celebrated song across Asia. In The New Rolling Stone Album Guide, the author noted the music "delights in its own sound."

=== Accolades ===
Publication	List	Rank	Ref.
Q	50 Best Albums of 1994	23	
Rolling Stone	Essential Recordings of the '90s	*	
Slant Magazine	50 Essential Pop Albums	*	

- denotes an unranked list.

== Commercial performance ==
The album reached number one on the UK and the Irish albums charts. It spent a total of 86 weeks on the UK chart. On 24 June 1994, it became the fifth album in rock history to reach number one more than a year after release. At the end of 1995, it ranked as the 50th best selling album in Australia. It reached number 18 on the US Billboard 200 album chart and stayed on the chart for 138 weeks. Worldwide, the album sold six million copies.

== Track listing ==
=== Original release ===
All lyrics are written by Dolores O'Riordan, except for "(They Long to Be) Close to You" written by Hal David; all music is composed by O'Riordan and Noel Hogan, except where noted. All songs produced by Stephen Street, except where noted.

Everybody Else Is Doing It, So Why Can't We? – Standard edition
No.	Title	Music	Length
1.	"I Still Do"		3:16
2.	"Dreams"		4:32
3.	"Sunday"		3:30
4.	"Pretty"		2:16
5.	"Waltzing Back"	O'Riordan	3:38
6.	"Not Sorry"		4:20
7.	"Linger"		4:34
8.	"Wanted"		2:07
9.	"Still Can't..."		3:38
10.	"I Will Always"	O'Riordan	2:42
11.	"How"	O'Riordan	2:51
12.	"Put Me Down"		3:33
Total length:			40:54

=== 2002 release ===
The 2002 re-release included additional tracks.

The Complete Sessions 1991–1993 (2002)
No.	Title	Music	Producer(s)	Length
13.	"Reason"			2:02
14.	"Them"		Pearse Gilmore	3:42
15.	"What You Were"	O'Riordan		3:41
16.	"Liar"			2:22
17.	"Pretty" (remix) (from Prêt-à-Porter, 1994)			3:41
18.	"How" (radical mix)	O'Riordan		2:58
Total length:				59:34

=== Super Deluxe (2018) ===
==== Disc two ====
Album out-takes (Note: Tracks 15–21 of disc two were recorded under the name The Cranberry Saw Us.)
No.	Title	Music	Length
1.	"Íosa"	O'Riordan	4:09
2.	"What You Were" (demo)	O'Riordan	3:42
3.	"Linger" (Dave Bascombe mix)		4:40
4.	"How" (alternate version)	O'Riordan	2:52

Single b-sides
No.	Title	Music	Length
5.	"Liar"		2:24
6.	"What You Were"	O'Riordan	3:41
7.	"Reason"		2:02
8.	"How" (radical mix)	O'Riordan	2:58
9.	"Them"		3:42
10.	"Pretty" (remix) (from Prêt-à-Porter, 1994)		3:41

Debut EP
No.	Title	Producer(s)	Length
11.	"Uncertain"	Pearse Gilmore	3:06
12.	"Nothing Left at All"	Gilmore	3:54
13.	"Pathetic Senses"	Gilmore	3:36
14.	"Them"	Gilmore	3:44

Early demos
No.	Title	Producer(s)	Length
15.	"Dreams" (unmixed)	Gilmore	4:06
16.	"Sunday"	The Cranberries	4:52
17.	"Linger"	The Cranberries	5:10
18.	"Chrome Paint"	The Cranberries	3:35
19.	"Fast One"	The Cranberries	3:32
20.	"Shine Down"	The Cranberries	4:12
21.	"Dreams" (pop mix)	The Cranberries	4:08
Total length:			77:46

==== Disc three ====
Live at Cork Rock (1 June 1991)
No.	Title	Length
1.	"Put Me Down"	2:55
2.	"Dreams"	4:10
3.	"Uncertain"	2:54

Live at Féile, Tipperary (31 July 1994)
No.	Title	Music	Length
4.	"Pretty"		2:37
5.	"Wanted"		2:08
6.	"Daffodil Lament"	O'Riordan	4:40
7.	"Linger"		4:50
8.	"I Can't Be with You"		3:13
9.	"How"	O'Riordan	2:56
10.	"Ode to My Family"		4:53
11.	"Not Sorry"		3:55
12.	"Waltzing Back"	O'Riordan	3:46
13.	"Dreams"		4:37
14.	"Ridiculous Thoughts"		4:32
15.	"Zombie"	O'Riordan	5:23
16.	"(They Long to Be) Close to You" (Carpenters cover)	Burt Bacharach	3:09
Total length:			60:38

==== Disc four ====
Dave Fanning, RTÉ Radio Session, 1991
No.	Title	Length
1.	"Dreams"	4:11
2.	"Uncertain"	3:29
3.	"Reason"	1:58
4.	"Put Me Down"	2:53

John Peel, BBC Radio 1 Session, 1992
No.	Title	Music	Length
5.	"Waltzing Back"	O'Riordan	3:34
6.	"Linger"		3:25
7.	"Wanted"		2:12
8.	"I Will Always"	O'Riordan	2:41

Dave Fanning, RTÉ Radio Session 1993
No.	Title	Music	Length
9.	"The Icicle Melts"	O'Riordan	3:12
10.	"Wanted"		2:03
11.	"Like You Used To"		2:34
12.	"False"		2:28
Total length:			34:40

== Personnel ==
Personnel taken from the album's liner notes, except where noted.

The Cranberries

- Dolores O'Riordan – vocals, acoustic guitar, keyboard strings and string arrangements on "Linger"
- Noel Hogan – guitars, backing vocals
- Mike Hogan – bass guitar
- Fergal Lawler – drums, percussion

Additional musicians

- Mike Mahoney – backing vocals and additional sounds on "Dreams"
- Duke Quartet – strings
  - John Metcalfe – string arrangements

Technical

- Stephen Street – production, engineering
- Aidan McGovern – additional engineering (all except "Not Sorry")
- Andy Earl – photography
- Valerie Phillips – photography
- Cally – art direction, design

== Charts ==
=== Weekly charts ===
1993–1995 weekly chart performance for Everybody Else Is Doing It, So Why Can't We?
Chart (1993–1995)	Peak position
Australian Albums (ARIA)	16
Canada Top Albums/CDs (RPM)	19
European Albums (Music & Media)	14
German Albums (Offizielle Top 100)	18
Irish Albums (IFPI)	1
New Zealand Albums (RMNZ)	9
Scottish Albums (Official Charts)	2
Swedish Albums (Sverigetopplistan)	24
UK Albums (Official Charts)	1
US Billboard 200	18
US Heatseekers Albums (Billboard)	4

2001 weekly chart performance for Everybody Else Is Doing It, So Why Can't We?
Chart (2001)	Peak position
French Albums (SNEP)	146

2018 weekly chart performance for Everybody Else Is Doing It, So Why Can't We?
Chart (2018)	Peak position
Belgian Albums (Ultratop Wallonia)	113

2024–2026 weekly chart performance for Everybody Else Is Doing It, So Why Can't We?
Chart (2024–2026)	Peak position
Croatian International Albums (HDU)	22
US Top Rock & Alternative Albums (Billboard)	37

=== Year-end charts ===
1994 year-end chart performance for Everybody Else Is Doing It, So Why Can't We?
Chart (1994)	Position
Australian Albums (ARIA)	68
UK Albums (OCC)	17
US Billboard 200	45

1995 year-end chart performance for Everybody Else Is Doing It, So Why Can't We?
Chart (1995)	Position
Australian Albums (ARIA)	50
UK Albums (OCC)	74
US Billboard 200	131

== Certifications ==
Certifications for Everybody Else Is Doing It, So Why Can't We?
Region	Certification	Certified units/sales
Australia (ARIA)	Platinum	70,000^{^}
Canada (Music Canada)	Platinum	100,000^{^}
Denmark (IFPI Danmark)	Gold	10,000^{‡}
France (SNEP)	Gold	100,000^{*}
Mexico (AMPROFON)	Gold	100,000^{^}
New Zealand (RMNZ)	Platinum	15,000^{^}
United Kingdom (BPI)	2× Platinum	600,000^{^}
United States (RIAA)	5× Platinum	5,000,000^{^}
Summaries
Worldwide	—	7,000,000
^{*} Sales figures based on certification alone.^{^} Shipments figures based on certification alone.^{‡} Sales+streaming figures based on certification alone.
