= I Can't Be with You =

1995 song by the Cranberries

Single by the Cranberries

from the album No Need to Argue
- B-side: "(They Long to Be) Close to You"
- Released: 27 February 1995
- Length: 3:08
- Label: Island
- Composers: Dolores O'Riordan; Noel Hogan
- Lyricist: Dolores O'Riordan
- Producer: Stephen Street

The Cranberries singles chronology
"Ode to My Family" (1994)	"I Can't Be with You" (1995)	"Ridiculous Thoughts" (1995)

Audio sample
- "I Can't Be with You": file; help

Music video
- "I Can't Be With You" on YouTube

"I Can't Be with You" is a song by Irish rock band the Cranberries. It was released by Island Records as the third single from their second studio album, No Need to Argue (1994), except in North America, where it was released as the fourth and final single of the album. The song achieved minor chart success in most of the European countries where it was released, peaking at number 21 in their native Ireland. In Iceland, the song reached number one for a week in April 1995, becoming the Cranberries' third consecutive number-one single there. Its music video was directed by Samuel Bayer.

== Critical reception ==
Chuck Campbell from Knoxville News Sentinel named 'I Can't Be with You' "a mundane pining-away song". In his weekly UK chart commentary, James Masterton complimented it as "another epic single" from the Cranberries, adding that O'Riordan's yodelling "sounds as hauntingly lovely as ever". Johnny Cigarettes from NME wrote, "Twanging guitars, meandering minor chords, quick burst of yodelling, two indifferent choruses and you're left with an embarrassing mess on the floor." Tony Cross from Smash Hits gave it four out of five and named it "the best pop song" of the album, saying, "Their most complete song since 'Linger', 'I Can't Be with You' is a crackling anthem about the pain of lost love. Like a West of Ireland coastline, it's raw yet beautiful, powerful yet delicate... And it's great to freak out to, so, er, just buy it."

== Music video ==
The accompanying music video to "I Can't Be with You" was directed by Samuel Bayer who was also the director of several of the band's other hit singles: "Zombie", "Ode to My Family", and "Ridiculous Thoughts". The video shows lead singer Dolores O'Riordan wearing 1920s clothing, kneeling beside a bed and bathing a child in a small bathtub. She then appears walking through desolate buildings and streets with a wooden torch with an old man dressed as an angel often lurking in the background. Throughout the video the band is seen playing in grassland while wearing red suits. At the end of the video, the old man returns to the location where he was seen at the beginning of the clip. Parts of the video was filmed at Copped Hall in Epping.

== Track listings ==
- 7-inch single
1. "I Can't Be with You"
2. "(They Long to Be) Close to You" (Burt Bacharach, Hal David)
- CD single
1. "I Can't Be with You"
2. "(They Long to Be) Close to You"
3. "Empty" (live on BBC Radio One FM Evening Session, 26 September 1994)
- Limited-edition CD single
1. "I Can't Be with You" (live on BBC Radio One FM Evening Session, 26 September 1994)
2. "Zombie" (acoustic)
3. "Daffodil Lament" (live at Feile, Tipperary, 30 July 1994)
- Australian CD single (cardboard sleeve)
1. "I Can't Be with You"
2. "Empty" (live on BBC Radio One FM Evening Session, 26 September 1994)
3. "I Can't Be with You" (live on BBC Radio One FM Evening Session, 26 September 1994)

== Charts ==
=== Weekly charts ===
Chart (1995)	Peak position
Australia (ARIA)	30
Europe (Eurochart Hot 100)	57
Europe (European Hit Radio)	35
France (SNEP)	24
Iceland (Íslenski Listinn Topp 40)	1
Ireland (IRMA)	21
Netherlands (Dutch Top 40 Tipparade)	18
Netherlands (Single Top 100 Tipparade)	11
New Zealand (Recorded Music NZ)	25
Scotland Singles (OCC)	26
UK Singles (OCC)	23

=== Year-end charts ===
Chart (1995)	Position
Iceland (Íslenski Listinn Topp 40)	30

== Release history ==
Region	Date	Format(s)	Label(s)	Ref.
United Kingdom	27 February 1995	7-inch vinyl; CD1; cassette	Island	
Japan	5 March 1995	Mini-CD	Island	
United Kingdom	6 March 1995	CD2	Island	
