= No Need to Argue =

Studio album by The Cranberries
- Released: 3 October 1994
- Recorded: November 1993 – August 1994
- Studios: The Manor, Shipton-on-Cherwell, UK; Townhouse, London, UK; Magic Shop, New York City
- Genres: Alternative rock; jangle pop; Irish folk; post-punk
- Length: 50:30
- Label: Island
- Producer: Stephen Street

The Cranberries chronology
| Everybody Else Is Doing It, So Why Can't We? (1993) | No Need to Argue (1994) | To the Faithful Departed (1996) |

Singles from No Need to Argue
- 1. "Zombie" Released: 19 September 1994; 2. "Ode to My Family" Released: 21 November 1994; 3. "I Can't Be with You" Released: 27 February 1995; 4. "Ridiculous Thoughts" Released: 31 July 1995

No Need to Argue is the second studio album by Irish alternative rock band the Cranberries, released on 3 October 1994, through Island Records. It is the band's best-selling album, and had sold over 17 million copies worldwide as of 2014. It contains one of the band's most well-known songs, "Zombie". The album's mood is considered to be darker and harsher than that on the band's debut album Everybody Else Is Doing It, So Why Can't We?, released a year prior.

== Composition ==
In some of the songs, the band decided to take on a rockier and heavier side, using distortion and increasing the volume. Drummer Fergal Lawler said the musical change happened because after two years of touring to promote their debut album, "we had been used to hearing ourselves loud on stage and everything, so maybe that's a natural thing that happened then." During a week off in New York City, the band decided to record demos for the upcoming album, and after calling producer Stephen Street and having him fly in from London, recorded early versions of six songs at the Magic Shop recording studios.

The song "Yeat's Grave" [sic] is about William Butler Yeats, and quotes one of his poems, No Second Troy.

The O'Riordan written track "Zombie" is, according to her, about the Warrington IRA bombings in 1993 that resulted in the death of two children. "The Icicle Melts" a track written by O'Riordan, she states in a 1994 issue of Vox magazine as well as a 1994 Hot Press article that the song was written about the case of James Bulger and her reaction. O'Riordan also states in the 1994 Hot press article that the original title of the song was "The Liverpool child" a reference to where James Bulger was murdered.

== Cover art ==
For the sleeve design, art director Cally re-enlisted photographer Andy Earl and hired the same sofa that featured on the debut album. The sofa was transported by hand to many locations in and around Dublin including Dalkey Island, coming to rest in a photo studio in Dublin where the white room had been constructed for the cover shot. The band, somewhat influenced by a recent Blur photo, decided to dress up and wear suits. The hand lettering was by Charlotte Villiers, video coordinator at Island Records and distant relative of the Villiers engine manufacturing family.

Each single sleeve featured the band on the sofa in a different location. These images also appeared in the album's booklet. The disc itself featured a photo of just the sofa in the same room. The sofa later appeared in the video for "Alright" by the British band Supergrass in 1995.

== Critical reception ==
Professional ratings
Initial reviews (in 1994)
Review scores
| Source | Rating |
|---|---|
| Chicago Tribune | 3/4 stars |
| Robert Christgau | (2-star Honorable Mention) |
| Entertainment Weekly | B |
| Knoxville News Sentinel | 3.5/5 stars |
| Music Week | 4/5 stars |
| NME | 4/10 |
| Q | 4/5 stars |
| San Francisco Examiner | 3/5 stars |
| Select | 2/5 medals |

Professional ratings
Retrospective reviews (after 1994)
Review scores
| Source | Rating |
|---|---|
| AllMusic | 4/5 stars |
| Rolling Stone | 2.5/5 stars |
| Sputnikmusic | 4.5/5 |

Dylan Yadav of Immortal Reviews wrote: "No Need To Argue, their 1994 record that cemented their importance in Irish music". Yadav described that the "rustic upbringing" of O'Riordan's childhood—reflected on "Ode to My Family", "gives credence to the rest of the album and it's [sic] personal, grassroots presence". "Yeat's Grave", in "similar fashion" of "Zombie", "is dark and describes those struggles", Yadav opined. He finished the retrospective review by stating that "the Cranberries turned their struggles to art in No Need To Argue, an album that helped bring to light what the culture of Ireland was. Dolores O'Riordan made it all happen with her voice, and that's not to discredit the rest of the band; but that voice is what made the Cranberries stand out amongst the rest. She voiced the struggle of a whole country". In a contemporary review, J. D. Considine wrote that some songs reminded the vocal styles of other artists like "Ridiculous Thoughts" recalling Sinéad O'Connor, "particularly the way O'Riordan handles the phrase 'Twister, aow' and "Zombie" is a bit too much like early Siouxsie and the Banshees". Though Considine positively added, "neither song makes that debt seem especially problematic". The reviewer praised O'Riordan for her performance; "the most memorable thing about her delivery is its unvarnished emotionality". In a retrospective review, AllMusic noted a progression in O'Riordan's way of singing: "No Need to Argue starts to see O'Riordan take a more commanding and self-conscious role", notably on the heavy rock track "Zombie". However, reviewer Ned Raggett stated; "where No Need succeeds best is when the Cranberries stick at what they know, resulting in a number of charmers like "Twenty One," the uilleann pipes-touched "Daffodil's Lament," [...] and the evocative "Disappointment"."

== Legacy ==
On 5 August 1995, Billboard stated that No Need to Argue was PolyGram's highest selling album of the year to date, with 5.1 million copies sold in six months. On 10 March 1996, the Cranberries won a Juno Awards for Best-Selling Album. In 2009, No Need to Argue was ranked No. 90 on Billboard magazine: "300 Best-Selling Albums of All Time". In July 2014, Guitar World placed No Need to Argue at No. 41 in their "Superunknown: 50 Iconic Albums That Defined 1994" list.

== Track listing ==
=== Original release ===
All lyrics are written by Dolores O'Riordan; all music is composed by O'Riordan and Noel Hogan, except where noted.

| No. | Title | Music | Length |
|---|---|---|---|
| 1. | "Ode to My Family" | | 4:31 |
| 2. | "I Can't Be with You" | | 3:08 |
| 3. | "Twenty One" | | 3:07 |
| 4. | "Zombie" | O'Riordan | 5:06 |
| 5. | "Empty" | | 3:28 |
| 6. | "Everything I Said" | | 3:52 |
| 7. | "The Icicle Melts" | O'Riordan | 2:54 |
| 8. | "Disappointment" | | 4:14 |
| 9. | "Ridiculous Thoughts" | | 4:33 |
| 10. | "Dreaming My Dreams" | O'Riordan | 3:37 |
| 11. | "Yeat's Grave" | O'Riordan | 2:59 |
| 12. | "Daffodil Lament" | O'Riordan | 6:08 |
| 13. | "No Need to Argue" | O'Riordan | 2:54 |
| Total length: | | | 50:30 |

The Complete Sessions 1994–1995 (2002)
| No. | Title | Writer(s) | Length |
|---|---|---|---|
| 14. | "Away" | | 2:38 |
| 15. | "I Don't Need" | | 3:32 |
| 16. | "(They Long to Be) Close to You" | Burt Bacharach; Hal David | 2:41 |
| 17. | "So Cold in Ireland" | | 4:45 |
| 18. | "Zombie" (Camel's Hump mix) | | 7:54 |
| Total length: | | | 73:50 |

25th Anniversary Edition (2020)
| No. | Title | Length |
|---|---|---|
| 14. | "Yesterday’s Gone" (from MTV Unplugged) | 4:01 |
| 15. | "Away" | 2:40 |
| 16. | "I Don’t Need" | 3:30 |
| 17. | "So Cold in Ireland" | 4:44 |
| 18. | "(They Long to Be) Close to You" | 2:41 |
| 19. | "Zombie" (A Camel’s Hump Remix by The Orb) | 7:52 |

=== 25th Anniversary Edition (2020) ===
Magic Shop demos
| No. | Title | Length |
|---|---|---|
| 1. | "Song to My Family" | 4:34 |
| 2. | "So Cold in Ireland" | 4:38 |
| 3. | "Empty" | 3:23 |
| 4. | "Ridiculous Thoughts" | 4:11 |
| 5. | "Everything I Said" | 3:57 |
| 6. | "Yeat's Grave" | 3:07 |

Demos
| No. | Title | Length |
|---|---|---|
| 7. | "Serious" | 2:41 |
| 8. | "Away" | 2:26 |
| 9. | "I Don’t Need" | 3:22 |

Live at the Liverpool Royal Court, 14 October 1994
| No. | Title | Length |
|---|---|---|
| 10. | "Dreaming My Dreams" | 4:28 |
| 11. | "Daffodil Lament" | 4:55 |
| 12. | "The Icicle Melts" | 3:25 |
| 13. | "No Need to Argue" | 3:07 |
| 14. | "Empty" | 3:36 |

Live at the National Stadium, Milton Keynes, 30 July 1995
| No. | Title | Length |
|---|---|---|
| 15. | "I Can’t Be with You" | 3:18 |
| 16. | "Ridiculous Thoughts" | 6:32 |
| 17. | "Zombie" | 5:51 |

== Personnel ==
Personnel taken from No Need to Argue liner notes.

The Cranberries

- Dolores O'Riordan – vocals, electric & acoustic guitars, keyboards, string arrangements
- Noel Hogan – electric & acoustic guitars
- Mike Hogan – bass guitar
- Fergal Lawler – drums, percussion

Additional personnel

- Stephen Street – production, engineering
- Julie Gardiner – production and engineering assistance
- Edward Douglas – recording and mixing assistance ("Everything I Said", "Yeat's Grave")
- John & his string section
- Andy Earl – photography
- Cally – design, art direction

== Chart positions ==
=== Weekly charts ===
Initial chart performance for No Need to Argue
| Chart (1994–95) | Peak position |
|---|---|
| Australian Albums (ARIA) | 1 |
| Austrian Albums (Ö3 Austria) | 1 |
| Belgian Albums (Ultratop Flanders) | 2 |
| Belgian Albums (Ultratop Wallonia) | 1 |
| Canadian Albums (Billboard) | 1 |
| Danish Albums (IFPI) | 1 |
| Dutch Albums (Album Top 100) | 2 |
| European Albums (Billboard) | 1 |
| French Albums (SNEP) | 1 |
| German Albums (Offizielle Top 100) | 1 |
| Hungarian Albums (MAHASZ) | 10 |
| Irish Albums (IFPI) | 2 |
| Italian Albums (Musica e Dischi) | 3 |
| New Zealand Albums (RMNZ) | 1 |
| Norwegian Albums (VG-lista) | 3 |
| Portuguese Albums (AFP) | 2 |
| Scottish Albums (Official Charts) | 4 |
| Spanish Albums (AFYVE) | 1 |
| Swedish Albums (Sverigetopplistan) | 1 |
| Swiss Albums (Schweizer Hitparade) | 2 |
| UK Albums (Official Charts) | 2 |
| US Billboard 200 | 6 |

Chart performance for No Need to Argue upon Dolores O'Riordan's death
| Chart (2018) | Peak position |
|---|---|
| Czech Albums (ČNS IFPI) | 67 |
| Irish Albums (IRMA) | 16 |
| Irish Albums (Official Charts) | 16 |
| Italian Albums (FIMI) | 50 |

| Chart (2025) | Peak position |
|---|---|
| Croatian International Albums (HDU) | 37 |
| Greek Albums (IFPI) | 8 |

=== Year-end charts ===
1994 year-end chart performance for No Need to Argue
| Chart (1994) | Position |
|---|---|
| Australian Albums (ARIA) | 25 |
| Canada Top Albums/CDs (RPM) | 47 |
| European Albums (European Top 100 Albums) | 84 |
| Swedish Albums & Compilations (Sverigetopplistan) | 36 |

1995 year-end chart performance for No Need to Argue
| Chart (1995) | Position |
|---|---|
| Australian Albums (ARIA) | 3 |
| Austrian Albums (Ö3 Austria) | 6 |
| Belgian Albums (Ultratop Flanders) | 5 |
| Belgian Albums (Ultratop Wallonia) | 2 |
| Canada Top Albums/CDs (RPM) | 7 |
| Dutch Albums (Album Top 100) | 11 |
| European Albums (European Top 100 Albums) | 1 |
| French Albums (SNEP) | 2 |
| German Albums (Offizielle Top 100) | 2 |
| New Zealand Albums (RMNZ) | 1 |
| Spanish Albums (AFYVE) | 4 |
| Swedish Albums & Compilations (Sverigetopplistan) | 17 |
| Swiss Albums (Schweizer Hitparade) | 3 |
| UK Albums (OCC) | 24 |
| US Billboard 200 | 12 |

1996 year-end chart performance for No Need to Argue
| Chart (1996) | Position |
|---|---|
| European Albums (European Top 100 Albums) | 98 |
| French Albums (SNEP) | 49 |
| New Zealand Albums (RMNZ) | 34 |

== Certifications and sales ==
Certifications and sales for No Need to Argue
| Region | Certification | Certified units/sales |
|---|---|---|
| Argentina (CAPIF) | Platinum | 60,000^{^} |
| Australia (ARIA) | 5× Platinum | 400,000 |
| Austria (IFPI Austria) | Platinum | 50,000^{*} |
| Belgium (BRMA) | 2× Platinum | 100,000^{*} |
| Canada (Music Canada) | 5× Platinum | 900,000 |
| Denmark (IFPI Danmark) | 5× Platinum | 100,000^{‡} |
| Finland (Musiikkituottajat) | Gold | 31,876 |
| France (SNEP) | Diamond | 1,500,000 |
| Germany (BVMI) | Platinum | 1,000,000 |
| Indonesia combined sales of first two albums | — | 170,000 |
| Italy (FIMI) since 2009 | Gold | 25,000^{‡} |
| Malaysia combined sales of first two albums | — | 150,000 |
| Mexico combined sales of first two albums | — | 200,000 |
| Netherlands (NVPI) | Platinum | 100,000^{^} |
| New Zealand (RMNZ) | Platinum | 15,000^{^} |
| Poland (ZPAV) | Platinum | 100,000^{*} |
| Spain (Promusicae) | 3× Platinum | 300,000^{^} |
| Sweden (GLF) | Platinum | 100,000^{^} |
| Switzerland (IFPI Switzerland) | Platinum | 50,000^{^} |
| United Kingdom (BPI) | 3× Platinum | 900,000^{^} |
| United States (RIAA) | 7× Platinum | 7,000,000^{^} |
Summaries
| Europe (IFPI) | 5× Platinum | 5,500,000 |
| Worldwide | — | 17,000,000 |
^{*} Sales figures based on certification alone.^{^} Shipments figures based on certification alone.^{‡} Sales+streaming figures based on certification alone.
