= When You're Gone (The Cranberries song) =

1996 single by the Cranberries

Single by the Cranberries

from the album To the Faithful Departed
- B-side: "Free to Decide"
- Released: October 1996
- Genre: Jangle pop
- Length: 4:57 (album version); 3:52 (radio edit)
- Label: Island
- Songwriter: Dolores O'Riordan
- Producers: Bruce Fairbairn; the Cranberries

The Cranberries singles chronology
"Free to Decide" (1996)	"When You're Gone" (1996)	"Hollywood" (1997)

Audio sample
- "When You're Gone": file; help

Music video
- "When You're Gone" on YouTube

"When You're Gone" is a song by Irish band the Cranberries. It is the third single from their third studio album, To the Faithful Departed (1996). The music video was directed by Karen Bellone and was released at the end of 1996. The song was first played during the North American leg of the No Need to Argue Tour in late 1994.

Upon its release, the song peaked at number four in Norway, earning a platinum disc there, and reached number nine in Canada. It additionally peaked within the top 30 in France, Iceland, Ireland, New Zealand, and the United States. In 2017, the song was released as an acoustic, stripped-down version on the band's Something Else album. The song was played at the end of Dolores O'Riordan's funeral on 23 January 2018, following her sudden death a week before in London at the age of 46. It was also played by the majority of Irish radio stations at the same time during the funeral.

== Music video ==
The music video was directed by Karen Bellone and Jake Scott. It is mostly in black and white. It features the "yellow room" from the album cover burning over a body of water.

== Track listings ==
Australian and European maxi-CD single

1. "When You're Gone" (edit) – 4:33
2. "Free to Decide" (live at Pine Knob, Clarkston, MI, 18 August 1996) – 3:13
3. "Sunday" (live at Pine Knob, Clarkston, MI, 18 August 1996) – 3:22
4. "Dreaming My Dreams" (acoustic – live at Cadena 40 Principales, Madrid, Spain, 31 January 1995) – 4:22
5. "Zombie" (acoustic – live at Cadena 40 Principales, Madrid, Spain, 31 January 1995) – 4:30

US CD single

1. "When You're Gone" (edit) – 4:30
2. "Free to Decide" (album version) – 4:24
3. "Free to Decide" (live at Pine Knob, Clarkston, MI, 18 August 1996) – 3:20
4. "Cordell" – 3:39
5. "Zombie" (MTV Unplugged, Brooklyn Academy of Music, New York, 14 February 1995) – 4:53
6. "Zombie" (A Camel's Hump Remix) – 7:56
7. Screensaver (multimedia)

European two-track single

1. "When You're Gone" (edit) – 4:33
2. "I'm Still Remembering" (acoustic – live at Cadena 40 Principales, Madrid, Spain, 31 January 1995) – 4:32

North American two-track single

1. "When You're Gone" – 4:55
2. "Free to Decide" – 4:24

== Charts ==
=== Weekly charts ===
Chart (1996–1997)	Peak position
Australia (ARIA)	40
Belgium (Ultratip Bubbling Under Flanders)	6
Canada (Nielsen SoundScan)	9
Canada Top Singles (RPM)	15
Canada Adult Contemporary (RPM)	41
France (SNEP)	26
Germany (GfK)	94
Iceland (Íslenski Listinn Topp 40)	8
Ireland (IRMA)	21
New Zealand (Recorded Music NZ)	23
Norway (VG-lista)	4
Sweden (Sverigetopplistan)	31
US Billboard Hot 100 with "Free to Decide"	22
US Adult Pop Airplay (Billboard)	17
US Pop Airplay (Billboard)	27

Chart (2018)	Peak position
Ireland (IRMA)	64
US Hot Rock Songs (Billboard)	25
US Rock Digital Song Sales (Billboard)	24

=== Year-end charts ===
Chart (1997)	Position
US Billboard Hot 100	95
US Top 40/Mainstream (Billboard)	93

== Certifications ==
Region	Certification	Certified units/sales
New Zealand (RMNZ)	Gold	15,000^{‡}
Norway (IFPI Norway)	Platinum	
^{‡} Sales+streaming figures based on certification alone.

== Release history ==
Region	Date	Format(s)	Label(s)	Ref.
France	October 1996	CD	Island	
United States	5 November 1996	Contemporary hit radio	Island	
United States	12 November 1996	7-inch vinyl; CD; cassette	Island	
Japan	25 May 1997	CD with screensaver	Island	
Japan	14 April 1998	CD without screensaver	Island	
