= To the Faithful Departed =

Studio album by the Cranberries
- Released: 29 April 1996
- Recorded: November 1995 – February 1996
- Studios: Windmill Lane, Dublin; Armoury, Vancouver, British Columbia
- Genres: Alternative rock; pop rock; post-punk
- Length: 52:19
- Label: Island
- Producers: Bruce Fairbairn, the Cranberries

The Cranberries chronology
No Need to Argue (1994)	To the Faithful Departed (1996)	Bury the Hatchet (1999)

Singles from To the Faithful Departed
- 1. "Salvation" Released: 8 April 1996; 2. "Free to Decide" Released: 1 July 1996; 3. "When You're Gone" Released: October 1996; 4. "Hollywood" Released: May 1997 (France)

Professional ratings
Review scores
Source	Rating
AllMusic	4/5 stars
Entertainment Weekly	A−
Los Angeles Times	3/4 stars
The New York Times	(favorable)
Robert Christgau	C+
Rolling Stone	2/5 stars
Sputnikmusic	3.5/5 stars
USA Today	2.5/4 stars
Wall of Sound	62/100

To the Faithful Departed is the third studio album by Irish alternative rock band the Cranberries, released on 29 April 1996. The album was made in memory of Denny Cordell, who signed the band to Island Records, and Joe O'Riordan (vocalist Dolores O'Riordan's grandfather), who had both died that year. The album reached number one in four countries and became the band's highest-charting album on the US Billboard 200, where it peaked at number four.

== Packaging ==
The album sleeve photo session was made up of two parts, the first being the original design for the front cover, a naked baby boy (supplied by their press officer Smash at Island Records) lying on his back, which was shot in photographer Andy Earl's new studio on Shad Thames in London, and the band seated in a yellow room. At the last minute, at Dolores O'Riordan's request, the two were swapped and the yellow room became the front cover.

The yellow room was designed to be an echo of the previous two album sleeves. It was built in London and transported to the Lake District and erected in a forest near Loughrigg Holme. Snow fell on the day of the photoshoot, and the band spent as little time as possible on the shoot clad, as they were wearing new purple Dolce & Gabbana outfits.

A new logo and typeface were decided upon signifying the band's desire to move on from the strict repetition of the previous album sleeves. Incidental studio photos were included, taken by Cally in the band's studio in Vancouver, Canada. Cally added: "I attended the surreal Brit Awards where Jarvis Cocker invaded Michael Jackson's stage and left soon after to drive through horizontal snow to get to the Lake District in readiness for the photo shoot the next day. On waking in the Ambleside Hotel I saw Jarvis on the front cover of every paper, being released from jail with Nigel, The Cranberries A&R man beside him. Things only became more surreal when we realised that later we were shooting the band bravely clad in thin purple suits under snowfall in a yellow room in a forest in the Lake District".

== Television performances ==
To promote To the Faithful Departed, the Cranberries appeared on different television shows (1995–1996).

Television show	Performance date	Broadcast date	Media	Location	Setlist	Notes
Concierto Básico 40	31 January 1995	1995	40 Principales	Madrid, Spain	1. "I'm Still Remembering"; 2. "Dreaming My Dreams"; 3. "Ode to My Family"; 4. "Empty"; 5. "Zombie"	▪ Acoustic set ▪ Dolores grows her hair long ▪ The first performance of "I'm Still Remembering"
MTV Unplugged	14 February 1995	18 April 1995	MTV USA	New York City, United States	1. "Dreaming My Dreams; 2. "Ode to My Family"; 3. "Linger"; 4. "Free to Decide"; 5. "I'm Still Remembering"; 6. "Empty"; 7. "Zombie; 8. "Yesterday's Gone"; 9. "No Need to Argue"	▪ Acoustic set ▪ Recorded at the Brooklyn Academy of Music ▪ Accompanied by the Electra strings ▪ The only performance of "Yesterday's Gone"
The Late Show with David Letterman	7 August 1995	7 August 1995	CBS	New York City, United States	"I Just Shot John Lennon"	▪ Hosted by David Letterman ▪ Dolores dyes her hair red
Sanremo Music Festival 1996	24 February 1996	24 February 1996	Rai 1	Sanremo, Italy	"Salvation"	▪ Hosted by Pippo Baudo ▪ Recorded at the Teatro Ariston
X-Ray Vision	11 April 1996	11 April 1996	MTV Europe	London, England	1. "Salvation"; 2. "Free to Decide"	▪ Hosted by Ray Cokes
TFI Friday	12 April 1996	12 April 1996	Channel 4	London, England	"Salvation"	▪ Hosted by Chris Evans
1996 MTV Video Music Awards	4 September 1996	4 September 1996	MTV USA	New York City, United States	"Salvation"	▪ Hosted by Dennis Miller ▪ Live broadcast from Radio City Music Hall
The Late Show with David Letterman	10 September 1996	10 September 1996	CBS	New York City, United States	"Free to Decide"	▪ Hosted by David Letterman

== Free to Decide World Tour ==
To the Faithful Departed
- Tour by The Cranberries
- Associated album: To the Faithful Departed
- Start date: 30 April 1996
- End date: 9 September 1996
- Legs: 2

The Cranberries concert chronology
- No Need to Argue World Tour (1994–95); Free to Decide World Tour (1996); Loud and Clear Promo Tour (1999)

In 1996, the Cranberries toured in Asia, Oceania and North America to promote their third studio album To the Faithful Departed. The band embarked on a 117-date world tour which began on 30 April 1996 in Philippines but was stopped on 8 June 1996 in Cairns during the Australian leg, due to a knee injury of O'Riordan. The remaining dates of the Australian tour were canceled and O'Riordan returned to Ireland for surgery. The tour resumed on 1 August 1996 in North America but was stopped after twenty-eight concerts because of poor physical and mental health of O'Riordan. The Cranberries complained that they never had a rest since the beginning of their career and invoked saturation. O'Riordan was pressured by managers not to stop the tour because of a cost between $8 million to $14 million. Despite this, the remaining dates of the North American tour and the European leg of the Free to Decide World Tour were canceled.

=== Dates ===
Date	City/Town	Country	Venue
First Leg
Asia
30 April 1996	Pasay	Philippines	Cuneta Astrodome
1 May 1996	Pasay	Philippines	Cuneta Astrodome
4 May 1996	Bangkok	Thailand	Huamark Stadium
6 May 1996	Taipei	Taiwan	Convention Centre
8 May 1996	Hong Kong	China	Coliseum
11 May 1996	Tokyo	Japan	Nakano Sun Plaza
13 May 1996	Tokyo	Japan	Akasaka Blitz
14 May 1996	Tokyo	Japan	Akasaka Blitz
16 May 1996	Fukuoka	Japan	Skara Es Patio
17 May 1996	Osaka	Japan	Koseinenkin Kaikan
Oceania
20 May 1996	Christchurch	New Zealand	Town Hall
21 May 1996	Christchurch	New Zealand	Town Hall
23 May 1996	Wellington	New Zealand	Events Centre
25 May 1996	Auckland	New Zealand	Supertop
27 May 1996	Newcastle	Australia	Entertainment Centre
29 May 1996	Melbourne	Australia	National Tennis Centre
30 May 1996	Melbourne	Australia	National Tennis Centre
1 June 1996	Launceston	Australia	Silverdome
2 June 1996	Hobart	Australia	Derwent Entertainment Centre
5 June 1996	Canberra	Australia	Bruce Stadium
Asia
26 June 1996	Kuala Lumpur	Malaysia	Stadium Negara

== Track listing ==
=== Original release ===
All lyrics are written by Dolores O'Riordan; all music is composed by O'Riordan except tracks 2, 9, 10 and 13, which are by O'Riordan and Noel Hogan.

No.	Title	Length
1.	"Hollywood"	5:08
2.	"Salvation"	2:23
3.	"When You're Gone"	4:56
4.	"Free to Decide"	4:25
5.	"War Child"	3:50
6.	"Forever Yellow Skies"	4:09
7.	"The Rebels"	3:20
8.	"Intermission"	2:03
9.	"I Just Shot John Lennon"	2:41
10.	"Electric Blue"	4:51
11.	"I'm Still Remembering"	4:48
12.	"Will You Remember?"	2:49
13.	"Joe"	3:22
14.	"Cordell"	3:41
15.	"Bosnia"	5:40
Total length:		58:02

The Complete Sessions 1996–1997 (2002)
No.	Title	Writer(s)	Length
16.	"The Picture I View"		2:28
17.	"Ave Maria" (Luciano Pavarotti with Dolores O'Riordan, live)		4:13
18.	"Go Your Own Way"	Lindsey Buckingham	4:03
19.	"God Be with You" (from The Devil's Own O.S.T., Dolores O'Riordan solo)		3:34
Total length:			72:31

=== 1996 US version ===
No.	Title	Length
1.	"Hollywood"	5:08
2.	"Salvation"	2:23
3.	"When You're Gone"	4:56
4.	"Free to Decide"	4:25
5.	"War Child"	3:50
6.	"Forever Yellow Skies"	4:09
7.	"The Rebels"	3:20
8.	"I Just Shot John Lennon"	2:41
9.	"Electric Blue"	4:51
10.	"I'm Still Remembering"	4:48
11.	"Will You Remember?"	2:49
12.	"Joe"	3:22
13.	"Bosnia"	5:40
Total length:		52:19

== Personnel ==
=== The Cranberries ===
- Dolores O'Riordan – vocals, electric & acoustic guitars, keyboards, whistle, mandolin
- Noel Hogan – electric & acoustic guitars, mandolin
- Mike Hogan – bass guitar
- Fergal Lawler – drums, percussion

=== Additional musicians ===
- Michael Kamen – orchestration
- Henry Daag – saw ("Bosnia")
- Richie Buckley – tenor saxophone ("Salvation")
- Michael Buckley – baritone saxophone ("Salvation")
- Bruce Fairbairn – trumpet ("Salvation")
- Randy Raine-Reusch – additional percussion

=== Producing and technical staff ===
- Bruce Fairbairn – production
- The Cranberries – production
- Mike Plontikoff – engineering, mixing
- Andy Earl – photography
- Adrian Myers – assistant photography
- Baron Kallstein – incidental photography (aka Cally: art director)

== Charts ==
=== Weekly charts ===
Weekly chart performance for To the Faithful Departed
Chart (1996)	Peak position
Australian Albums (ARIA)	1
Austrian Albums (Ö3 Austria)	5
Belgian Albums (Ultratop Flanders)	4
Belgian Albums (Ultratop Wallonia)	1
Canada Top Albums/CDs (RPM)	5
Dutch Albums (Album Top 100)	3
Europe (European Top 100 Albums)	1
Finnish Albums (Suomen virallinen lista)	2
French Albums (SNEP)	5
German Albums (Offizielle Top 100)	2
Hungarian Albums (MAHASZ)	7
Italian Albums (FIMI)	1
Irish Albums (IFPI)	1
New Zealand Albums (RMNZ)	1
Norwegian Albums (VG-lista)	3
Spanish Albums (AFYVE)	2
Swedish Albums (Sverigetopplistan)	1
Swiss Albums (Schweizer Hitparade)	3
UK Albums (Official Charts)	2
US Billboard 200	4

Chart performance for To the Faithful Departed upon Dolores O'Riordan's death
Chart (2018)	Peak position
Czech Albums (ČNS IFPI)	79

=== Year-end charts ===
1996 year-end chart performance for To the Faithful Departed
Chart (1996)	Position
Australian Albums (ARIA)	23
Austrian Albums (Ö3 Austria)	26
Dutch Albums (Album Top 100)	88
Europe (European Top 100 Albums)	18
France (Top 50)	5
German Albums (Ofizielle Top 100)	32
New Zealand Albums (RMNZ)	9
Spanish Albums (AFYVE)	46
Swedish Albums (Sverigetopplistan)	50
Swiss Albums (Schweizer Hitparade)	35
UK Albums (OCC)	62
US Billboard 200	42

== Certifications ==
Certifications and sales for To the Faithful Departed
Region	Certification	Certified units/sales
Australia (ARIA)	2× Platinum	140,000^{^}
Austria (IFPI Austria)	Gold	25,000^{*}
Belgium (BRMA)	Gold	25,000^{*}
Canada (Music Canada)	3× Platinum	300,000^{^}
France (SNEP)	Platinum	300,000^{*}
Germany (BVMI)	Gold	250,000^{^}
Hong Kong (IFPI Hong Kong)	2× Platinum	40,000^{*}
New Zealand (RMNZ)	Platinum	15,000^{^}
Norway (IFPI Norway)	Platinum	50,000^{*}
Poland (ZPAV)	Gold	50,000^{*}
Spain (Promusicae)	Platinum	100,000^{^}
Sweden (GLF)	Gold	50,000^{^}
Switzerland (IFPI Switzerland)	Gold	25,000^{^}
United Kingdom (BPI)	Gold	100,000^{^}
United States (RIAA)	2× Platinum	2,000,000^{^}
Summaries
Worldwide	—	5,800,000
^{*} Sales figures based on certification alone.^{^} Shipments figures based on certification alone.
