= Hollywood (The Cranberries song) =

1997 single by the Cranberries

Single by the Cranberries

from the album To the Faithful Departed
- B-side: "Forever Yellow Skies"
- Released: 1 May 1997
- Recorded: November and December 1995
- Genre: Alternative rock = Grunge
- Length: 5:09
- Label: Island
- Songwriter: Dolores O'Riordan
- Producers: Bruce Fairbairn; The Cranberries

The Cranberries singles chronology
"When You're Gone" (1996)	"Hollywood" (1997)	"Promises" (1999)

"Hollywood" is a rock song by Irish band the Cranberries. It is the fourth single from the band's third album, entitled To the Faithful Departed. Plans to record a video clip were abandoned after the band cancelled the remainder of their Free to Decide World Tour and other promotional activities due to lead singer Dolores O'Riordan's health problems. The worldwide release of a commercial CD single was cancelled as well, except in France.

== Track listings ==
2-track CD single (France)

1. "Hollywood" – 5:06
2. "Forever Yellow Skies" (Live in Toronto, 29 August 1996) – 3:28

4-track CD single (France)

1. "Hollywood" – 5:06
2. "Forever Yellow Skies" (Live in Toronto, 29 August 1996) – 3:28
3. "Dreams" (Live in Toronto, 29 August 1996) – 4:20
4. "Waltzing Back" (Live in Toronto, 29 August 1996) – 4:59

== Cover ==
In 2020, it was covered by doom metal band Thou and indie rock singer Emma Ruth Rundle for their collaborative EP The Helm of Sorrow.
