= Promises (The Cranberries song) =

1999 song by the Cranberries

Single by the Cranberries

from the album Bury the Hatchet
- B-side: "The Sweetest Thing"
- Released: 22 March 1999
- Length: 5:27 (album version); 3:30 (radio edit)
- Label: Island; Mercury
- Songwriter: Dolores O'Riordan
- Producers: Benedict Fenner; the Cranberries

The Cranberries singles chronology
"Hollywood" (1997)	"Promises" (1999)	"Animal Instinct" (1999)

Alternate covers
- UK CD single 2

Music video
- "Promises" on YouTube

"Promises" is a rock song by Irish rock band the Cranberries. It is the first single from the band's fourth album, Bury the Hatchet, released in 1999. The song was the only single from the album to chart in the US and the last single before their hiatus. The song, which has a heavy rock beat with strident lead guitar, deals with the subject of divorce. A music video involving a cowboy confronting a witch/scarecrow hybrid (played by Maïwenn), directed by Olivier Dahan, was released to promote the single.

"Promises" became the band's ninth and final UK top-40 hit, reaching number 13 on the UK Singles Charts, while in the band's native Ireland, it reached number 19. Elsewhere, the song peaked atop the Spanish Singles Chart and reached the top 20 in Canada, Iceland, New Zealand, Norway, and Switzerland. In the United States, it peaked at number 12 on the Billboard Modern Rock Tracks chart.

== Music video ==
A music video directed by Olivier Dahan was released in 1999 to promote the single, shot in the style of an old western film. The sheriff of an unnamed town and one of his deputies are found inside the police station guarding what seems to be a ball of energy that is held prisoner inside a cell, while another deputy is far away in the desert picking up flowers. While the latter is completely absorbed in this endeavor, a nearby female scarecrow (played by Maïwenn) suddenly comes to life and starts chasing him. The cowboy quickly gets on his horse and makes haste back to town, trying to fend off the creature with his pistol along the way while she showers him with energy rays shot from her hands. Most of the video involves the chase between the scarecrow witch and the deputy, as well as the band members playing their instruments atop the town's water tower. The deputy finally makes it to town and enters the police station, where he quickly informs the sheriff about the incoming scarecrow and her apparent purpose to free the aforementioned energy orb. The sheriff, apparently very secure of his gun skills, calms down both of his men and exits the station to challenge the scarecrow to a duel. The sheriff is first to draw and shoot, but the scarecrow stops the bullet in midair with her teeth, much to the sheriff's bewilderment. She then shoots an energy ray from her mouth and disintegrates the sheriff, leaving only his smoking boots still standing behind. The scarecrow frees the energy orb from its captivity and both then fly away, with the words "The End" appearing on the screen.

== Track listings ==
UK CD1

1. "Promises" (edit) – 3:30
2. "The Sweetest Thing" – 3:33
3. "Linger" (live, August 1996)

UK CD2

1. "Promises"
2. "Dreams" (live at the Nobel Peace Prize Concert, Oslo)
3. "Promises" (live at the Nobel Peace Prize Concert, Oslo)

Canadian maxi-CD single

1. "Promises" (radio edit) – 3:30
2. "The Sweetest Thing" – 3:33
3. "Promises" – 5:27
4. "Linger" (live) – 4:40

== Charts ==
=== Weekly charts ===
Weekly chart performance for "Promises"
Chart (1999)	Peak position
Australia (ARIA)	78
Austria (Ö3 Austria Top 40)	37
Belgium (Ultratip Bubbling Under Flanders)	6
Belgium (Ultratop 50 Wallonia)	21
Canada (Nielsen SoundScan)	6
Europe (Eurochart Hot 100)	13
France (SNEP)	32
Germany (GfK)	45
Greece (IFPI)	5
Iceland (Íslenski Listinn Topp 40)	3
Ireland (IRMA)	19
Italy (FIMI)	3
Italy Airplay (Music & Media)	1
Netherlands (Dutch Top 40 Tipparade)	2
Netherlands (Single Top 100)	42
New Zealand (Recorded Music NZ)	20
Norway (VG-lista)	17
Scotland Singles (OCC)	10
Spain (Promusicae)	1
Sweden (Sverigetopplistan)	33
Switzerland (Schweizer Hitparade)	19
UK Singles (OCC)	13
US Alternative Airplay (Billboard)	12

=== Year-end charts ===
Year-end chart performance for "Promises"
Chart (1999)	Position
US Modern Rock Tracks (Billboard)	81

== Release history ==
Release dates and formats for "Promises"
Region	Date	Format(s)	Label(s)	Ref(s).
United States	8–9 March 1999	Radio	Island	
Europe	22 March 1999	Maxi-CD	Island	
Canada	23 March 1999	Maxi-CD	Island; Universal	
Japan	1 April 1999	Maxi-CD	Island	
United Kingdom	5 April 1999	CD; cassette	Island; Mercury	
