= Ode to My Family =

1994 single by the Cranberries

Single by the Cranberries

from the album No Need to Argue
- B-side: "So Cold in Ireland"
- Released: 21 November 1994
- Genre: Alternative rock; jangle pop; dream pop
- Length: 4:31
- Label: Island
- Composers: Dolores O'Riordan; Noel Hogan
- Lyricist: Dolores O'Riordan
- Producer: Stephen Street

The Cranberries singles chronology
"Zombie" (1994)	"Ode to My Family" (1994)	"I Can't Be with You" (1995)

Audio sample
- "Ode to My Family": file; help

Music video
- "Ode to My Family" on YouTube

"Ode to My Family" is a song by Irish band the Cranberries, released on 21 November 1994 by Island Records as the second single from their second studio album, No Need to Argue (1994). The song was written by band members Dolores O'Riordan and Noel Hogan, and produced by Stephen Street. It was a hit in Oceania and several European countries, topping the charts in Iceland, and reaching number four in France, number five in Australia, and number eight in New Zealand. Its accompanying music video was directed by Samuel Bayer. In 2017, the song was released as an acoustic, stripped down version on the band's Something Else album.

== Composition ==
"Ode to My Family" is written in the key of D major with a tempo of 94 beats per minute. The entire piece follows the chord progression 4/4 |: D | Bm | F♯m | Gsus2 D/A :| ostinato.

The song, written by singer Dolores O'Riordan and guitarist Noel Hogan, is about O'Riordan's yearning for her simple life as a child after having achieved success, and includes a string arrangement composed by O'Riordan.

== Critical reception ==
Dave Sholin from the Gavin Report felt that O'Riordan's delivery "gives this song a special meaning, which makes for a compelling musical experience." Chuck Campbell from Knoxville News Sentinel said the new album "offers a bucolic opening" in "Ode to My Family". Dave Jennings from Melody Maker viewed it as "a curious but brave choice as a single" featuring "a highly personal and intriguing lyric." He added, "Dolores delivers it with her usual fierce conviction, and the song becomes a slightly guilty pleasure, like you're eavesdropping on a domestic row."

Pan-European magazine Music & Media wrote, "Let Dolores be your station's guardian angel. Real Christmas family spirit is generated by this ballad which surpasses all the rest currently available when it comes to sincerity." Pete Stanton from Smash Hits gave it a score of two out of five, saying, "'Ode to My Family' is back to their folky ways. Very Irish, tinkling strings and probably a pint or two of Guinness in the studio." In 2018, Billboard and Stereogum ranked the song number eight and number four, respectively, on their lists of the top ten Cranberries songs.

== Music video ==
The single's accompanying music video, shot in black-and-white, was directed by American visual artist, cinematographer, and director Samuel Bayer, who had also directed the band's video for their preceding single, "Zombie". Bayer stated on his Facebook account that the "Ode to My Family" music video was edited by Robert Duffy at Spot Welders, and the "Zombie" video was edited by Eric Zumbrennen.

== Track listings ==
- UK and Australian CD1
1. "Ode to My Family"
2. "So Cold in Ireland"
3. "No Need to Argue" (live on the Later with Jools Holland, June 1994)
4. "Dreaming My Dreams" (live on the Later with Jools Holland, June 1994)
- UK and Australian CD2
1. "Ode to My Family" (live at Féile, Thurles, County Tipperary, 30 July 1994)
2. "Dreams" (live at Féile, Thurles, 30 July 1994)
3. "Ridiculous Thoughts" (live at Féile, Thurles, 30 July 1994)
4. "Zombie" (live at Féile, Thurles, 30 July 1994)
- UK 7-inch and cassette single
1. "Ode to My Family"
2. "So Cold in Ireland"
- US CD EP and Canadian CD single
1. "Ode to My Family" (album version) – 4:32
2. "So Cold in Ireland" – 4:43
3. "Dreaming My Dreams" (live on the Later with Jools Holland, June 1994) – 3:52
4. "Zombie" (live at Féile, Thurles, 30 July 1994) – 5:17

== Charts ==
=== Weekly charts ===
Chart (1995)	Peak position
Australia (ARIA)	5
Belgium (Ultratop 50 Flanders)	18
Canada Retail Singles (The Record)	13
Canada Top Singles (RPM)	25
Europe (Eurochart Hot 100)	33
Europe (European Hit Radio)	19
France (SNEP)	4
Germany (GfK)	29
Iceland (Íslenski Listinn Topp 40)	1
Ireland (IRMA)	16
Israel (Israeli Singles Chart)	10
Mexico (Notitas Musicales)	1
Netherlands (Dutch Top 40)	19
Netherlands (Single Top 100)	22
New Zealand (Recorded Music NZ)	8
Scottish Singles Sales (Official Charts)	18
UK Singles (Official Charts)	26
US Radio Songs (Billboard)	39
US Alternative Airplay (Billboard)	11
US Pop Airplay (Billboard)	35

Chart (2018)	Peak position
Ireland (IRMA)	46
US Hot Rock & Alternative Songs (Billboard)	17

=== Year-end charts ===
Chart (1995)	Position
Australia (ARIA)	93
France (SNEP)	28
Iceland (Íslenski Listinn Topp 40)	10

== Certifications and sales ==
Region	Certification	Certified units/sales
Australia (ARIA)	Gold	35,000^{^}
New Zealand (RMNZ)	Platinum	30,000^{‡}
United Kingdom (BPI)	Silver	200,000^{‡}
^{^} Shipments figures based on certification alone.^{‡} Sales+streaming figures based on certification alone.

== Release history ==
Region	Date	Format(s)	Label(s)	Ref.
United Kingdom	21 November 1994	7-inch vinyl; CD; cassette	Island	
Japan	5 December 1994	CD	Island	
Australia	13 February 1995	CD1; cassette	Island	
Australia	27 February 1995	CD2	Island	
