= Free to Decide =

1996 single by the Cranberries

Single by the Cranberries

from the album To the Faithful Departed
- B-side: "The Picture I View"
- Released: 1 July 1996
- Length: 4:26
- Label: Island
- Songwriter: Dolores O'Riordan
- Producers: Bruce Fairbairn, the Cranberries

The Cranberries singles chronology
| "Salvation" (1996) | "Free to Decide" (1996) | "When You're Gone" (1997) |

Music video
- "Free to Decide" on YouTube

"Free to Decide" is a song by Irish rock band the Cranberries, released as the second single from their third studio album, To the Faithful Departed (1996), on 1 July 1996. The song achieved minor chart success in Europe but became a top-10 hit in Canada, peaking at number two on the RPM 100 Hit Tracks chart. In the United States, it peaked at number 22 on the Billboard Hot 100 and number eight on the Modern Rock Tracks chart. In 2017, the song was released as an acoustic version on the band's Something Else album.

== Composition ==
The song is written in the key of G major with a tempo of 118 beats per minute.

== Music video ==
The music video was directed by Marty Callner and was shot in a desert. Dolores O'Riordan escapes from the press and drives in her jeep as her band performs with yellow walls behind them. Dolores appears in a white outfit singing the song in a birdcage and dancing by a giant picture frame. At the end of the video, the last 30 seconds plays the interlude where the whole video reverses back to the beginning.

== Track listings ==
UK CD1

1. "Free to Decide"
2. "Cordell"
3. "The Picture I View"

UK CD2

1. "Free to Decide"
2. "Salvation" (live at Milton Keynes Bowl)
3. "Bosnia"

UK cassette single

1. "Free to Decide"
2. "Cordell"

European CD single

1. "Free to Decide" – 4:25
2. "Salvation" (live at Milton Keynes Bowl) – 2:22

European maxi-CD single

1. "Free to Decide"
2. "Salvation" (live at Milton Keynes Bowl)
3. "Sunday" (live at The Point, Dublin)
4. "Dreaming My Dreams" (live at The Point, Dublin)

Australian and Japanese CD single

1. "Free to Decide"
2. "The Picture I View"
3. "Salvation" (live at Milton Keynes Bowl)
4. "Ridiculous Thoughts" (live at The Point, Dublin)

US, Canadian, and Japanese maxi-CD single (with "When You're Gone")

1. "When You're Gone" (edit) – 4:29
2. "Free to Decide" (album version) – 4:24
3. "Free to Decide" (live at Pine Knob, Clarkston, Michigan, 18 August 1996) – 3:11
4. "Cordell" – 3:40
5. "Zombie" (from MTV Unplugged) – 4:54
6. "Zombie" (A Camel's Hump remix) – 7:53
7. Screensaver

US CD, 7-inch, and cassette single (with "When You're Gone")

1. "When You're Gone" – 4:55
2. "Free to Decide" – 4:24

== Charts ==
=== Weekly charts ===
| Chart (1996) | Peak position |
|---|---|
| Australia (ARIA) | 43 |
| Canada Top Singles (RPM) | 2 |
| Canada Adult Contemporary (RPM) | 31 |
| Canada Rock/Alternative (RPM) | 2 |
| Czech Republic (IFPI CR) | 9 |
| Europe (Eurochart Hot 100) | 63 |
| France (SNEP) | 43 |
| Germany (GfK) | 94 |
| Iceland (Íslenski Listinn Topp 40) | 5 |
| Ireland (IRMA) | 28 |
| New Zealand (Recorded Music NZ) | 19 |
| Scottish Singles Sales (Official Charts) | 39 |
| Sweden (Sverigetopplistan) | 40 |
| UK Singles (Official Charts) | 33 |
| US Billboard Hot 100 with "When You're Gone" | 22 |
| US Adult Alternative Airplay (Billboard) | 6 |
| US Adult Pop Airplay (Billboard) | 23 |
| US Alternative Airplay (Billboard) | 8 |
| US Pop Airplay (Billboard) | 16 |

=== Year-end charts ===
| Chart (1996) | Position |
|---|---|
| Canada Top Singles (RPM) | 29 |
| Canada Rock/Alternative (RPM) | 36 |
| Iceland (Íslenski Listinn Topp 40) | 70 |
| US Modern Rock Tracks (Billboard) | 55 |
| US Top 40/Mainstream (Billboard) | 60 |
| US Triple-A (Billboard) | 17 |

== Release history ==
| Region | Date | Format(s) | Label(s) | Ref. |
|---|---|---|---|---|
| United Kingdom | 1 July 1996 | CD; cassette | Island | |
| Japan | 15 August 1996 | CD | Island | |
