= Linger (The Cranberries song) =

1993 single by the Cranberries

- Artwork for the 1993 European release (UK 7-inch single pictured)

Single by the Cranberries

from the album Everybody Else Is Doing It, So Why Can't We?
- B-side: 1993: "Reason", "How" (remix); 1994: "Pretty", "I Still Do" (live), "Waltzing Back" (live)
- Released: 15 February 1993
- Studio: Windmill Lane (Dublin, Ireland)
- Genre: Alternative rock; indie rock; pop; dream pop
- Length: 4:34
- Label: Island
- Composers: Noel Hogan; Dolores O'Riordan
- Lyricist: Dolores O'Riordan
- Producer: Stephen Street

The Cranberries singles chronology
"Dreams" (1992)	"Linger" (1993)	"Zombie" (1994)

Music video
- "Linger" on YouTube

Alternative cover
- Artwork for the North American release (US CD single pictured)

"Linger" is a song by Irish alternative rock band the Cranberries from their debut studio album, Everybody Else Is Doing It, So Why Can't We? (1993). Written by band members Dolores O'Riordan and Noel Hogan, and produced by Stephen Street, "Linger" was first released as the second and final single from the album on 15 February 1993 by Island Records. It was later re-released on 31 January 1994.

"Linger", which has an acoustic arrangement featuring a string section, became the band's first major hit, peaking at number three in their native Ireland, number eight in the United States, and number 14 in the United Kingdom. Additionally, "Linger" was voted by Australian Triple J listeners as number three on the Triple J Hottest 100, 1993 chart. The accompanying music video was directed by Melodie McDaniel and received heavy rotation on MTV as well as a nomination at the 1994 Billboard Music Video Awards.

In 1990, "Linger" was released on a demo tape with "Dreams" in Ireland only in the middle of that year under their initial band name, the Cranberry Saw Us. In 2017, an acoustic, stripped-down version of "Linger" was released as the lead single from the band's seventh studio album, Something Else. "Linger" is written in the key of D major.

== Background ==
When O'Riordan was auditioned as the lead singer for the band, she wrote the lyrics, turning it into a song of regret based on an experience with a 17-year-old soldier she once fell in love with. Drummer Fergal Lawler recalled the process in an interview, saying:

It was a Sunday afternoon. She arrived with a keyboard under her arm, just set it up and played a few songs. We couldn't really hear her because she was singing through a guitar amp or something. I gave her a lift up to the bus stop and I was saying, 'Will we see you next week?' We gave her a tape of the music for 'Linger', which she took with her. The following week she came back, and she had lyrics written out and melodies and she sang along to what we were playing, and it was like, 'Oh, my God. She's great'.

In the documentary '99 Love Life & Rock 'n' Roll, O'Riordan says that the song is about her first serious kiss.

"Linger" has since become one of the band's most famous songs, though O'Riordan noted that the band did not expect the song to reach the level of commercial success that it did. In a 2012 interview, O'Riordan commented, "I remember when MTV first put 'Linger' in heavy rotation, every time I walked into a diner or a hotel lobby, it was like, 'Jesus, man, here I am again'. It was trippy, like Jacob's Ladder. I didn't even have to take drugs".

In an interview for NME, guitarist Noel Hogan said of the song:

It's only really since Dolores passed away that I've grown a proper appreciation for songs like 'Linger' and 'Dreams'. They were just songs in the set list for us; everybody else was losing their mind about them. And when I listen to them now I realise how great they are for someone so young, which I never, ever appreciated until a year ago. We must have played it a gazillion times in our lives and it just becomes a part of the set, but it's different now. We're so lucky to have left that behind, to have that legacy.

== Critical reception ==
Jason Elias of AllMusic described "Linger" as "a song of regret, epic in scope and sweeping", praising the instrumentation and O'Riordan's vocals: "While this isn't lyrically novel, the full-on emotionality of lead singer Dolores O'Riordan makes this stand out. Singing in a strong Irish brogue she comes off both needy and detached here. It's that emotion that powers this track". David Stubbs from Melody Maker commented, "Fragile, underwhelming acoustic thing with strings in which the girl, in prim, unsullied Irish vowels, pleads for her partner to put her out of her misery and end the relationship he's no longer interested in. Don't all rush to Virgin Megastore at once." Upon the 1994 re-release, the magazine's Caitlin Moran concluded, "Good songs never disappear; they just keep getting released and re-released until you capitulate and buy the f***er." A reviewer from Music & Media wrote, "Currently on tour with the Hothouse Flowers, these fellow Irishmen deserve your attention. Don't hang round the bar, but move forwards to the stage to check out their alternative pop with shades of folk."

Martin Aston from Music Week gave it a score of four out of five, adding that it "combines a gorgeous, melting vocal from Dolores with a delicate folky melody." Another Music Week editor, Alan Jones, named it a "delightful single", noting that "floating in on a breeze, it has a haunting, fragile quality and an almost country feel." Amanda Petrusich of The New Yorker described the song as "a hazy, sentimental song about realizing that you're on the bummer end of a lopsided relationship". Andrew Harrison from Select wrote, "'Linger' has a lovely orchestra busying itself in the far distance and keeping the tune at arm's length, while Dolores gets powerfully lovelorn. Could do with more pedal steel, though." Tony Cross from Smash Hits gave it a top score of five out of five and named it Best New Single, adding, "Dolores O'Riordan's voice comes straight from the chill out room and oils the song's creaky form into fabulous, delicious and delicate motion. Settle back into an old leather sofa for a long, long time and let it linger." "Linger" was ranked at number 86 on VH1's 100 Greatest Songs of the '90s.

== Music video ==
The music video for "Linger", shot in black-and-white, was directed by American director Melodie McDaniel and based loosely on Jean-Luc Godard's 1965 science fiction noir film Alphaville—a "film that considers the potency of desire". In one of the rooms of the hotel, a silent film is being shown which features 1950s stripper and burlesque performer Blaze Starr.

"Linger" received heavy rotation on MTV in 1993. It was also nominated for Best New Artist Clip of the Year in the category for Alternative/Modern Rock at the 1994 Billboard Music Video Awards.

== Track listings ==
UK 7-inch and cassette single

1. "Linger" (album version) – 4:33
2. "Reason" – 2:01

UK 12-inch and CD single

1. "Linger" (single version) – 4:33
2. "Reason" – 2:01
3. "How" (Radical mix) – 2:56

US and Canadian CD single

1. "Linger" – 4:34
2. "Liar" – 2:21
3. "Them" – 3:44
4. "Reason" – 2:01

US cassette single

1. "Linger" – 4:34
2. "How" – 2:51

UK 7-inch and cassette single (1994)

1. "Linger"
2. "Pretty"

UK 10-inch EP (1994)

A1. "Linger" (live at The Record Plant, Hollywood)
A2. "I Still Do" (live at The Record Plant, Hollywood)
B1. "Waltzing Back" (live at The Record Plant, Hollywood)
B2. "Pretty" (live at The Record Plant, Hollywood)

UK CD single (1994)

1. "Linger" (LP version) – 4:33
2. "Pretty" – 2:16
3. "Waltzing Back" (live at The Record Plant, Hollywood) – 4:01
4. "Pretty" (live at The Record Plant, Hollywood) – 2:11

== Personnel ==
Personnel are taken from the Everybody Else Is Doing It, So Why Can't We? liner notes, and Sound on Sound.

The Cranberries

- Dolores O'Riordan – vocals, acoustic guitar, keyboard strings and string arrangements
- Noel Hogan – electric guitar
- Mike Hogan – bass guitar
- Fergal Lawler – drums, percussion

Additional musicians

- Duke Quartet – strings
  - John Metcalfe – string arrangements

Technical

- Stephen Street – production, engineering
- Aidan McGovern – additional engineering

== Charts ==
=== Weekly charts ===
1993–1994 weekly chart performance for "Linger"
Chart (1993–1994)	Peak position
Australia (ARIA)	33
Canada Top Singles (RPM)	4
Canada Adult Contemporary (RPM)	5
Europe (Eurochart Hot 100)	26
Europe (European Hit Radio)	16
Iceland (Íslenski Listinn Topp 40)	6
Ireland (IRMA)	3
Netherlands (Single Top 100 Tipparade)	7
New Zealand (Recorded Music NZ)	38
Panama (UPI)	5
Scottish Singles Sales (Official Charts)	8
UK Singles (Official Charts)	14
UK Airplay (Music Week)	7
US Billboard Hot 100	8
US Adult Contemporary (Billboard)	18
US Alternative Airplay (Billboard)	4
US Pop Airplay (Billboard)	7
US Cash Box Top 100	11

2018 weekly chart performance for "Linger"
Chart (2018)	Peak position
Ireland (IRMA)	11
Italy (FIMI)	89
Portugal (AFP)	100
UK Singles (Official Charts)	47
US Digital Song Sales (Billboard)	12
US Hot Rock & Alternative Songs (Billboard)	6

2024–2026 weekly chart performance for "Linger"
Chart (2024–2026)	Peak position
Global 200 (Billboard)	106

=== Year-end charts ===
1993 year-end chart performance for "Linger"
Chart (1993)	Position
US Modern Rock Tracks (Billboard)	26

1994 year-end chart performance for "Linger"
Chart (1994)	Position
Brazil (Crowley)	4
Canada Top Singles (RPM)	47
Canada Adult Contemporary (RPM)	68
Iceland (Íslenski Listinn Topp 40)	68
UK Singles (OCC)	74
US Billboard Hot 100	49

2024 year-end chart performance for "Linger"
Chart (2024)	Position
UK Singles (OCC)	97

== Certifications ==
Certifications for "Linger"
Region	Certification	Certified units/sales
Brazil (Pro-Música Brasil)	Gold	30,000^{‡}
Denmark (IFPI Danmark)	Gold	45,000^{‡}
Italy (FIMI)	Gold	50,000^{‡}
New Zealand (RMNZ)	5× Platinum	150,000^{‡}
Portugal (AFP)	2× Platinum	50,000^{‡}
Spain (Promusicae)	Gold	30,000^{‡}
United Kingdom (BPI)	3× Platinum	1,800,000^{‡}
United States (RIAA)	Gold	500,000^{^}
^{^} Shipments figures based on certification alone.^{‡} Sales+streaming figures based on certification alone.

== Release history ==
Release dates and formats for "Linger"
Region	Date	Format(s)	Label(s)	Ref.
United Kingdom	15 February 1993	7-inch vinyl; 12-inch vinyl; CD; cassette	Island	
Australia	17 May 1993	CD	Island	
Australia	30 May 1993	Cassette	Island	
United Kingdom	31 January 1994	7-inch vinyl; CD; cassette	Island	
United Kingdom	7 February 1994	10-inch vinyl	Island	

== Other versions ==
American punk rock band Screeching Weasel covered "Linger" on their 1999 album Emo.

Australian rock band Royel Otis covered "Linger" on 9 April 2024 at the SiriusXM studio in New York City for the Alt Nation channel. It was released as a single on 31 May 2024; that August, it debuted at No. 94 on the Billboard Hot 100, the band's first song to do so. The cover was heavily used on TikTok.
