= Dreams (The Cranberries song) =

1992 single by the Cranberries

- UK CD1 variant of the 1994 European re-release

Single by the Cranberries

from the album Everybody Else Is Doing It, So Why Can't We?
- B-side: "What You Were"; "Liar"
- Released: 5 October 1992
- Studio: Windmill Lane (Dublin)
- Genre: Alternative rock; dream pop
- Length: 4:32 (album version); 4:15 (UK radio edit); 4:02 (US radio edit)
- Label: Island
- Composers: Noel Hogan; Dolores O'Riordan
- Lyricist: Dolores O'Riordan
- Producer: Stephen Street

The Cranberries singles chronology
"Dreams" (1992)	"Linger" (1993)

Audio sample
- file; help

Music video
- "Dreams" on YouTube

Alternative cover
- US CD single (1994)

"Dreams" is a song by Irish rock band the Cranberries. It was originally released in October 1992 by Island Records as the band's debut single and later appeared on the band's debut album, Everybody Else Is Doing It, So Why Can't We? (1993). The song reached the top 50 of the US Billboard Hot 100 and the top 30 of the UK Singles Chart. A 1990 demo version was released in Ireland only in the summer of that year under their initial band name, the Cranberry Saw Us. At the end of the song, the backing vocals are sung by Mike Mahoney, ex-boyfriend of Cranberries lead singer Dolores O'Riordan. Three different music videos were made to promote the single, directed by John Maybury, Peter Scammell and Nico Soultanakis.

In 2017, the song was released as an acoustic, stripped-down version on the band's Something Else album.

== Background ==
According to lead singer Dolores O'Riordan, "Dreams" was written for an early love; she explained, "I wrote that about my first love when I was living in Ireland ... It's about feeling really in love for the first time". The song was later released on a demo tape with "Linger" that helped generate excitement for the band.

In a 2019 interview for New Musical Express, guitarist Noel Hogan said of the song:

It's only really since Dolores passed away that I've grown a proper appreciation for songs like 'Linger' and 'Dreams'. They were just songs in the set list for us; everybody else was losing their mind about them. And when I listen to them now I realise how great they are for someone so young, which I never, ever appreciated until a year ago. We must have played it a gazillion times in our lives and it just becomes a part of the set, but it’s different now. We’re so lucky to have left that behind, to have that legacy.

== Critical reception ==
Upon the 1992 release, Ian Gittins from Melody Maker named it Single of the Week. He complimented it as "intoxicating, beguiling, a gossamer waltz across sacred ground", and concluded, "So enjoy the delicate but profound delights of 'Dreams' now. The Cranberries may never be this good again." On the 1994 re-release, the magazine's Paul Mathur felt it "doesn't quite scale such heights" as 'Linger'.

Larry Flick from Billboard magazine wrote, "As predecessor 'Linger' does just that on the pop charts, band offers a new track for modern rock to get to work on. 'Dreams' should do the trick, with twining vocal harmonies and upbeat, sparkling guitars. Unusual, striking midsection also will draw attention, and song eventually should follow 'Linger' to top 40." Alan Jones from Music Week said, "A very different track to the long-lasting 'Linger', 'Dreams' is a more uptempo piece, less melodic but still a good bet."

Leesa Daniels from Smash Hits gave it a score of four out of five, praising the song as a "marvellous" follow-up. She said, "It hooks you right from the start with twangy guitars and loud drums. Then it calms down and Dolores comes in, singing like an angel." Clark Collis from Select felt it "strongly signposted a lilting Sundays feel". Charles Aaron from Spin commented, "Sinéadish wails over the drumbeat from Modern English's 'I Melt with You'. Dope. But after enduring the video, I sure hope singer Dolores O'Riordan has more compelling dreams than trotting around with a white horse and digging up hunks in the countryside."

== Music videos ==
There are three versions of the music video for the song, all three videos being their respective directors' only videos for the band. The first version features Dolores O'Riordan donning her original hairstyle that is seen on the Everybody Else Is Doing It, So Why Can't We? album cover. The video revolves around O'Riordan with the other band members while she's sitting down in a chair with a cross as a back or a close up of her face and eyes. The video shows a mirrored image of O'Riordan to show she does the background vocals and towards the end the band members fade in and out constantly in front of O'Riordan. This video was directed by English director John Maybury.

The second version shows the Cranberries performing the song in a dimly lit aquatic-themed room interspersed with shots of geometric flowers hitting water. This video received high rotation on MTV's 120 Minutes in 1993 before the release of the band's next single, "Linger", and the re-release of "Dreams" worldwide. This video was directed by Peter Scammell.

The third version, directed by Nico Soultanakis, which was most commonly shown in America and Ireland, shows the Cranberries performing the song in a nightclub. Afterward, Dolores O'Riordan heads out to a house where grave robbers dressed in black have placed a very large wood pile inside. Dolores bathes the pile in water and a man is revealed to be buried underneath. The water frees him and in the final seconds of the video, the man awakens.

== Track listings ==
- UK 7-inch and cassette single
1. "Dreams" – 4:15
2. "What You Were" – 3:41

Note: Both formats were re-released in 1994 and contain the same tracks

- UK 12-inch and CD single
1. "Dreams" – 4:32 (4:15 on CD)
2. "What You Were" – 3:41
3. "Liar" – 2:21

Note: The CD was re-released in 1994 as the first part of a two-CD set and contains the same tracks

- UK CD2 (1994)
1. "Not Sorry" (live at The Record Plant, Hollywood)
2. "Wanted" (live at The Record Plant, Hollywood)
3. "Dreams" (live at The Record Plant, Hollywood)
4. "Liar" (live at The Record Plant, Hollywood)
- US CD single
1. "Dreams" – 4:32
2. "What You Were" – 3:41
3. "Waltzing Back" (live at The Record Plant, Hollywood) – 4:01
4. "Pretty" (live at The Record Plant, Hollywood) – 2:11
- US cassette single
1. "Dreams" – 4:32
2. "What You Were" – 3:41
- Canadian CD single
1. "Dreams" – 4:32
2. "Linger" – 4:34

== Personnel ==
The Cranberries

- Dolores O'Riordan – vocals, acoustic guitar
- Noel Hogan – guitar, backing vocals
- Mike Hogan – bass guitar
- Fergal Lawler – drums, percussion

Additional personnel

- Mike Mahoney – backing vocals and additional sounds

Production

- Stephen Street – production, engineering
- Aiden McGovern – additional engineering

== Charts ==
=== Weekly charts ===
Chart (1993–1994)	Peak position
Australia (ARIA)	30
Canada Retail Singles (The Record)	12
Canada Top Singles (RPM)	27
Canada Adult Contemporary (RPM)	25
Europe (European Hit Radio)	33
Ireland (IRMA)	9
Mexico (Notitas Musicales)	1
Scottish Singles Sales (Official Charts)	31
UK Singles (Official Charts)	27
UK Airplay (Music Week)	10
US Billboard Hot 100	42
US Alternative Airplay (Billboard)	15
US Pop Airplay (Billboard)	33
US Cash Box Top 100	37

Chart (2018)	Peak position
Ireland (IRMA)	24
Italy (FIMI)	59
Poland Airplay (ZPAV)	75
Switzerland (Schweizer Hitparade)	77
US Digital Song Sales (Billboard)	16
US Hot Rock & Alternative Songs (Billboard)	7

=== Year-end charts ===
Chart (1994)	Position
UK Airplay (Music Week)	30

== Certifications ==
Region	Certification	Certified units/sales
Italy (FIMI) since 2009	Gold	35,000^{‡}
New Zealand (RMNZ)	3× Platinum	90,000^{‡}
Spain (Promusicae)	Platinum	60,000^{‡}
United Kingdom (BPI)	2× Platinum	1,200,000^{‡}
^{‡} Sales+streaming figures based on certification alone.

== Release history ==
Region	Date	Format(s)	Label(s)	Ref.
United Kingdom	5 October 1992	7-inch vinyl; 12-inch vinyl; CD; cassette	Island	
Australia	4 October 1993	CD; cassette	Island	
United Kingdom (re-release)	25 April 1994	7-inch vinyl; CD1; cassette	Island	
United Kingdom (re-release)	2 May 1994	CD2	Island	
Australia (re-release)	9 May 1994	Cassette	Island	
Australia (re-release)	23 May 1994	CD	Island	

== Dario G version ==
"Dream to Me"

Single by Dario G

from the album In Full Colour
- Released: 22 January 2001
- Length: 3:09
- Label: Manifesto
- Songwriters: Noel Hogan; Dolores O'Riordan; Scott Rosser; Paul Spencer
- Producers: Scott Rosser; Paul Spencer

Dario G singles chronology
"Voices" (2000)	"Dream to Me" (2001)	"Say What's on Your Mind" (2001)

English electronic music trio Dario G covered the song as "Dream to Me", with vocals provided by Ingrid Straumstøyl. O'Riordan's vocals were originally used for the track, but Dario G were not permitted to use them, so they had to re-record the song. Released on 22 January 2001 as the lead single from their second album, In Full Colour, "Dream to Me" reached number one in Romania and the top 10 in Austria, Germany, and the United Kingdom.

=== Track listings ===
- UK CD single
1. "Dream to Me" (radio edit) – 3:09
2. "Dream to Me" (Airscape remix) – 8:38
3. "Dream to Me" (Warrior mix) – 7:48
4. "Dream to Me" (video)
- UK 12-inch single

A. "Dream to Me" (Airscape remix) – 8:38
B. "Dream to Me" (Warrior mix) – 7:48

- UK cassette single
1. "Dream to Me" (radio edit) – 3:09
2. "Dream to Me" (Airscape remix) – 8:38
- European CD single
1. "Dream to Me" (radio edit) – 3:09
2. "Dream to Me" (Airscape remix) – 8:38
- European maxi-CD and Australian CD single
1. "Dream to Me" (radio edit) – 3:09
2. "Dream to Me" (Airscape remix) – 8:38
3. "Dream to Me" (Warrior mix) – 7:48
4. "Dream to Me" (Ian Wilkie mix) – 8:05

=== Charts ===
==== Weekly charts ====
Chart (2001)	Peak position
Australia (ARIA)	96
Austria (Ö3 Austria Top 40)	8
Belgium (Ultratop 50 Flanders)	38
Europe (Eurochart Hot 100)	38
Germany (GfK)	9
Ireland (IRMA)	16
Ireland Dance (IRMA)	5
Netherlands (Dutch Top 40)	33
Netherlands (Single Top 100)	50
Norway (VG-lista)	13
Romania (Romanian Top 100)	1
Scottish Singles Sales (Official Charts)	4
Spain (Promusicae)	18
Switzerland (Schweizer Hitparade)	15
UK Singles (Official Charts)	9
UK Dance (Official Charts)	6

==== Year-end charts ====
Chart (2001)	Position
Austria (Ö3 Austria Top 40)	64
Germany (Media Control)	55
Romania (Romanian Top 100)	7
Switzerland (Schweizer Hitparade)	88
UK Singles (OCC)	170

=== Release history ===
Region	Date	Format(s)	Label(s)	Ref.
United Kingdom	22 January 2001	12-inch vinyl; CD; cassette	Manifesto	
Australia	9 April 2001	CD	Manifesto	

== Other covers ==
- A Cantonese cover of the song, "Dream Lover" (Chinese: 夢中人), with backing vocals by herself, was a hit single for Chinese singer Faye Wong. It was included in her 1994 album Random Thoughts, and the song was prominently featured in the same year's film Chungking Express, in which Wong starred. Wong also recorded a Mandarin version, "Elude" (Chinese: 掙脫), on Sky. Both versions are popular in the Chinese media, and was used in the release date trailer of the 2027 video game Ananta.
- On April 13, 2010, Passion Pit released a cover of the song as part of the deluxe edition reissue of Manners (album).
- The song was covered by American singer Liza Anne in 2018. It was featured in a teaser trailer for the 2022 film Aftersun.
- In 2020, an Irish collective of female singers and musicians called Irish Women in Harmony, including Allie Sherlock, Caroline Corr, Erica Cody, Imelda May, Lisa Hannigan, Loah, Moya Brennan, Orla Gartland, Tolü Makay, Sibéal, Soulé, Una Healy and Wyvern Lingo recorded a version in aid of the charity Safe Ireland, which deals with domestic abuse which had reportedly risen significantly during the COVID-19 lockdown.
- Mexican singer Iran Castillo made a music video covering the song in 2020 with her sister Mónica Castillo and releasing it as a single.
- Canadian musician Rachel Bobbitt released a cover in 2023.
- The Woodgies, an Irish-Swiss sister duo, released a cover in May 2024.
- Sufjan Stevens and Meg Lui released a cover in April 2026.

== See also ==
- List of Romanian Top 100 number ones of the 2000s
