= Noel Hogan =

Irish musician and record producer (born 1971)

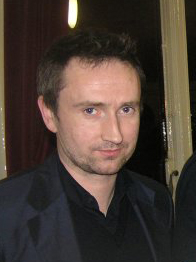
- Hogan in 2009

Background information
- Born: Noel Anthony Hogan; 25 December 1971 (age 54); Moyross, Limerick, Ireland
- Origin: Limerick, Ireland
- Genres: Rock
- Occupations: Musician; record producer
- Instrument: Guitar
- Years active: 1989–present
- Label: Gohan
- Formerly of: The Cranberries; Arkitekt; Mono Band; The Puro
- Website: noelhoganofficial.com

Noel Anthony Hogan (born 25 December 1971) is an Irish musician and record producer best known as the guitarist and co-songwriter of the Irish alternative rock band the Cranberries.

== The Cranberries ==
Hogan formed the Cranberries, originally known as the Cranberry Saw Us, with his brother Mike on bass and Fergal Lawler on drums in 1989. The group originally recruited Niall Quinn on vocals, but after he left the band following their debut EP, he was replaced by Dolores O'Riordan. The band went on to sell more than 40 million records worldwide. In total, Hogan has released eight albums with the Cranberries.

The Cranberries went on a six-year hiatus from 2003 to 2009. However, after O'Riordan's death on 15 January 2018, Hogan confirmed the group's disbandment, which occurred after the release of the posthumous album In the End in 2019, saying: "The Cranberries without Dolores just isn't The Cranberries ... we won't replace our friend and lead singer".

== Solo work ==
With the Cranberries on hiatus, Hogan turned to focus on his own music. He began working with programmer Matt Vaughan, who had already done work on unreleased Cranberries songs and Dolores O'Riordan's solo material. Mono Band was born with Hogan as the sole band member. With vocals being supplied by Richard Walters, Alexandra Hamnede, Kate Havnevik, and other guest artists, Hogan worked with Cranberries' veteran producer Stephen Street to compile a mix of 12 tracks. Working on his side project at the same time, saw their resulting debut album, Mono Band, released on 20 May 2005. Hogan and Mono Band vocalist Richard Walters went on to form Arkitekt. Arkitekt released two EPs at that time in 2009, working on new material.

Hogan's work independent of the Cranberries has been released on his own label, Gohan Records, and is published through Fairwood Music (UK) Ltd for the world.

Hogan has also been producing bands on the local music scene of Limerick. Gohan Records has recently released, in collaboration with Limerick Live 95FM's Green and Live show, "Tonelist", a collection featuring musicians in the Limerick music scene.

In 2022, Noel debuted The Puro, a new duo alongside Brazilian singer Mell Peck.

== Musical equipment ==
Hogan's musical equipment that he has used with the Cranberries over the years includes:

=== Guitars ===
- Gibson Les Paul Custom
- PRS Guitars Artist 22
- Fender Jaguar
- Fender Telecaster
- Fender Stratocaster
- Gibson Jumbo Acoustic guitar
- Taylor Jumbo Acoustic guitar
- Gibson ES-335

=== Amplifiers ===
- Vox AC30
- Fender Twin Reverb
- Marshall 30th Anniversary 3-channel head
- Marshall 4x12 speaker cabinets
- Diezel VH4 amp head
- Mesa Boogie Mark II

=== Effects ===
- Roland RE-301 Chorus Echo unit
- Ibanez Tube Screamer Overdrive pedal
- Pro Co RAT Distortion pedal
- Electro-Harmonix Big Muff Fuzz pedal
- Zvex Fuzz factory pedal
- Dunlop Manufacturing Tremolo pedal
- DigiTech Whammy pedal
- Electro-Harmonix Mirco-Synth pedal
- Watkins Copicat Delay pedal
- Line 6 Echo Park delay pedal
