= EMAC Recording Studios =

Recording studio in London, Ontario, Canada

EMAC Recording Studios is a music and commercial recording facility in downtown London Ontario Canada, established in 1979 by Robert Nation and Joe Vaughan. It offers services for Radio production and TV and Film.

== Building ==
EMAC Studios is located at 432 Rectory Street in downtown London, Ontario. The building was originally a Salvation Army church built in the 1900s before it was converted into a recording facility in 1990. The renovation and acoustic design was done by Andy Condon to the specifications set by Robert and Joe.

The original EMAC Recording Studios was first located in downtown London in a building which also housed CKSL Radio. It was originally designed as an audio/visual facility, and was later renovated in 1985 once EMAC had begun commercial and jingle work. In 2000, EMAC brought on Dan Brodbeck as a new partner.

== Studios ==
The control room of Studio 1 has a 60-channel Neve V3 Series console, with GML Automation faders. The room incorporates the use of RPG rear wall diffusers to create a certified ‘Reflection Free Zone,’ and was one of the earliest of its kind in Canada. Studio 2 is a smaller room and is primarily used as an edit suite. It houses a 36-channel Sony MXP3036 console with Sony ADS3000 automation. This space also has a Pro Tools rig for editing purposes, as well as music, dialogue and sound effect production.

== Selected discography ==
- Dolores O'Riordan – No Baggage & Are You Listening?
- Kittie – Spit & Oracle
- Landon Pigg – LP
- The Salads – Fold A to B & The Big Picture
- Headstrong – Headstrong
- Helix - The Power of Rock and Roll
- Jersey – Generation Genocide
- Holly McNarland – Live at the Great Hall
- Clockwise – Healthy Manipulation
- Nicole Scott – Self Titled
- BURNusBOTH – Stray Bullets
- Luddites – 86-91
- Don Campbell – Freedom
- Cirque du Soleil - Corteo

Producers and Engineers:

- Robert Nation
- Joe Vaughan
- Dan Brodbeck
- GGGarth Richardson
- Jack Richardson
- Moe Berg
- Matt Grady

== TV & film ==
- Pixar's Up
- Michael Moore’s Sicko
- Anne of Green Gables: A New Beginning
- High Point: Casinos of the World
- Taste of Life: A Gourmet Food Travel Show
