= Joe Vaughan (sound engineer) =

- Born: Niagara Falls, Ontario, Canada
- Occupations: Recording engineer, musician, professor
- Instrument: Drums

Joe Vaughan is a Canadian recording engineer, musician, and currently, professor of audio engineering in the Music Industry Arts program at Fanshawe College. He is also a founder and co-owner of EMAC Recording Studios in London, Ontario.

== Early life ==
Vaughan was born in Niagara Falls, Ontario and began playing drums at the age of 10. He played in local area bands while in high school, and later joined Stytch in which guitarist Derry Grehan of Canadian rock band fame Honeymoon Suite was a member.

== Career ==
In 1977 Vaughan attended the Music Industry Arts program at Fanshawe College in London, Ontario and graduated in 1980 with a diploma in recording engineering. During his last year at Fanshawe, Vaughan started EMAC Recording Studios with classmate Robert Nation. Throughout the 1980s busy punk scene, Vaughan and Robert Nation recorded albums for the likes of 63 Monroe, the Zellots, Sheep Look Up, the Crawling King Snakes, Mettle and others.

While continuing his audio engineering career in the 1990s, Vaughan also would play drums on recording sessions and live shows for various local area talent. One act that he played for, Canadian children's performer Glenn Bennett, eventually broke out and Vaughan went on to release three albums for BMG America, music videos for Disney, and he toured with the band throughout Canada, the United States and Japan. Through this relationship with Bennett, Vaughan also had the opportunity to play on and engineer the music soundtracks for a number of The Olsen Twins' music videos featuring Mary-Kate and Ashley Olsen.

In 1999 Vaughan departed on a career change, returning to his alma matta Fanshawe College to teach part-time in the Music Industry Arts program. In 2003 he accepted a full-time professor position and continues today to mentor young students in art of making quality music recordings.

Vaughan is also a member of the Canadian Academy of Recording Arts and Sciences and since 2005 has been the chair of the engineering committee for the Juno Award category of Recording Engineer of the Year. He also participates in educational panels for the Audio Engineering Society.

== Selected discography ==
- Sectorseven – Along the Way, Dual & Sectorseven
- Thomas Wade – Thomas Wade & Wayward & Lucky 13
- Headstrong – Headstrong
- John Kapelos – Sid the Karaoke Kid
- Denise Pelley – I'm Home
- '63 Monroe – '63 Monroe NFG, Stinkin' Out The Joint, Henry VIII & White Christmas
- Randy Carville – You'll Be The First To Know
- Twice Shy – Take Me Dancing
- Mettle – Mettle
- Glenn Bennett – Let's Go on Safari, I Like My Music with a Beat, I Must Be Growing & London Orchestra & Glenn Bennett
- The Adventures of Dudley the Dragon – Soundtrack
- The Olsen Twins – The Olsen Twins – Greatest Hits: Vol.2, The Adventures of Mary-Kate and Ashley – The Case of the Mystery Cruise [VHS] 1997 / The Case of the United States Navy Adventure [VHS] (1997) / The Case of the Hotel Who-Done-It [VHS] (1996) / The Case of the Volcano Mystery [VHS] (1997),

== See also ==
- EMAC Recording Studios
