= A Soap Bubble and Inertia =

Studio album by The Gandharvas
- Released: March 2, 1994
- Genre: Alternative rock
- Length: 51:06
- Label: Thermometer Sound Surface
- Producers: Dan Brodbeck, The Gandharvas

The Gandharvas chronology
A Soap Bubble and Inertia (1994)	Kicking in the Water (1995)

Professional ratings
Review scores
Source	Rating
Allmusic	2.5/5 stars

A Soap Bubble and Inertia is the debut album by Canadian alternative rock band The Gandharvas. It was released in 1994 on the Thermometer Sound Surface record label. The album peaked at #39 on the RPM Album chart in August, 1994. The album featured three singles; "The First Day of Spring", "The Coffee Song" and "Shadow", all which had music videos. By April 1998, the album had sold over 35,000 copies.

The album's title is taken from a line in the novel Notes from Underground by Fyodor Dostoevsky.

The album's lead single, "The First Day of Spring," was named "Song of the Year" for CFNY's 1994 CASBY Awards. In 2007, the same radio station ranked the song #14 in their "Top 102 Canadian New Rock Songs of All Time" list.

== Track listing ==
All tracks by The Gandharvas (Lyrics - Paul Jago)

1. "The First Day of Spring" – 4:25
2. "Saturn Quits Fasting" – 3:58
3. "The Coffee Song" – 3:20
4. "Bundle" – 4:20
5. "Beakfulls of Heroin" – 4:48
6. "Shadow" – 4:40
7. "The Supreme Personality" – 4:18
8. "Dallying" – 4:24
9. "Cans" (instrumental) – 2:55
10. "Soap Bubble Meets Inertia" – 8:02
11. "Elevator Bugs" – 3:12
12. "Circus Song" (instrumental) – 2:40

== Personnel ==
- Paul Jago – vocals, piano, cans
- Brian Ward – guitar, E-bow, piano
- Jud Ruhl – guitar, piano
- Tim McDonald – drums, percussion
- Eric Howden – bass, vocals
- Rob Blanchette – bass
- Noel Jago – percussion, backing vocals
- Dan Brodbeck – producer, engineering, mixing, accordion, tuba, drum programming, percussion, backing vocals
- Anthony Hudson – drum programming
- Alun Piggins – mixing
- Irene Gotz – artwork
- David Hayes – design, layout
- Andrew MacNaughtan – photography
