= Ordinary Day =

Ordinary Day may refer to:

- Ordinary Day, an album by Jeff & Sheri Easter, 2000
- "Ordinary Day" (Curiosity Killed the Cat song), 1987
- "Ordinary Day" (Vanessa Carlton song), 2002
- "Ordinary Day" (Dolores O'Riordan song), 2007
- "Ordinary Day" (Great Big Sea song), 1997
- "Ordinary Day", a song by Nick Lachey
- "Ordinary Day", a song by Judge Jules featuring Cara Dillon
- "Ordinary Day", a song by Ace of Base from their album Da Capo
- "Ordinary Day", a song by Todrick Hall featuring Nick Rashad Burroughs from Forbidden
- "Ordinary Day" (The Dirtmitts song), the theme song of the Canadian teen drama series Whistler
