= Joe Vaughan =

Joe or Joseph Vaughan may refer to:

- Joe Vaughan (former broadcast journalist, now author
- Joe Vaughan (recording engineer)
- Joe Vaughan (politician)
- Arky Vaughan (Joseph Floyd Vaughan), American baseball player
