= Downtime (disambiguation) =

The term downtime is used to refer to periods when a system is unavailable.

Downtime or Down Time may also refer to:

== Music ==
- "Downtime" (The Gandharvas song), 1997
- "Downtime" (Jo Dee Messina song), 2001
- "Down Time", a 2006 single by Aaradhna
- "Downtime", a 2009 song by Timothy B. Schmit from his album Expando
- Uptime / Downtime, a 2010 double album by the Kleptones
- "Down Time", a 2016 song by Usher from Hard II Love

== Film and television ==
- Downtime, a 1986 film directed by Greg Hanec and produced by the Winnipeg Film Group
- Downtime (Doctor Who), a 1995 direct-to-video spin-off of the TV series Doctor Who
- Downtime (film), a 1997 British film
- "Downtime", an episode of The Twilight Zone 2019 television series

== Other ==
- Downtime (break), a period of rest and relaxation, especially during a day of labour
- Down Time, a Turbo Drop ride at Lake Compounce amusement park, Bristol, Connecticut
- A Mnemonic for the seven wastes of Muda (Japanese term)
- Down Time, a 2013 zine by American artist Jeremy Bolm
