= The Big Picture (The Salads album) =

Studio album by The Salads
- Released: May 9, 2006
- Recorded: EMAC Recording Studios
- Label: Maui Wowie
- Producer: The Salads/Dan Brodbeck

The Salads chronology
Fold A to B	The Big Picture	Japanese version

Released on May 9, 2006, The Big Picture is the third full-length album, and fourth disc by Canadian punk rock band The Salads. It was released in 2006 on Maui Wowie Records and distributed by Warner Music Canada.

It was recorded over the course of 2005 and 2006 in London, Ontario at EMAC Studios, and features the singles Growing Up and A Better Way. Videos for Growing Up and Better Way received rotational play on Muchloud.

Exclaim! noted about the album, "For the most part, The Big Picture's songs are catchy, they've definitely perfected the palm mute, the rapid fire guitar riff, and the scratch-the-pick-against-the-strings manoeuvre."

== Track listing ==
No.	Title	Length
1.	"Growing Up"	3:19
2.	"Individual"	3:26
3.	"It's Alright"	3:23
4.	"A Better Way"	2:55
5.	"Seasons"	3:15
6.	"Got No Love"	2:56
7.	"Powerless"	3:42
8.	"Circles"	4:02
9.	"The First Time" (With Thank Yous)	8:28
10.	"Thick & Thin"	3:02
Total length:		38:28

== Personnel ==
- Chuck Dailey: Bass, Backing Vocals, lyrics
- Mista D: Vocals, lyrics
- Dave Ziemba: Guitar
- Grant Taylor: Drums, Backing Vocals
