= Robert Nation =

Canadian audio engineer and producer

Robert Nation is a Canadian audio engineer and producer as well as co-owner of EMAC Recording Studios in London, Ontario.

== Early life ==
Robert was born and raised on the West Island of Montreal where he attended Dorval High School. Robert's father, Ernie Nation, was the Head of Finance for RCA Records. In 1972, Ernie was transferred to Toronto, Ontario, when RCA's record division was relocated.

While in his teens, Robert started mixing live sound for local bands in Toronto and landed himself a gig at the offices of RCA Records. After taking a couple of small recording courses, Robert wanted to further his education in recording engineering and music production and moved to London, Ontario where he completed a 3-year diploma in the Music Industry Arts program at Fanshawe College. This is where he met his colleague, and eventual co-owner of EMAC Recording Studios, Joe Vaughan.

== Career ==
In his last year of college, Robert made the decision to open a recording studio in London, Ontario where the new music scene was vibrant and blossoming. Electronic Media Arts Corporation was first located in downtown London at 343 Richmond Street on the 3rd Floor of a large building, which also housed CKSL Radio. During the first 10 years of operation, Robert refined his record engineering and production talents, and helped EMAC Recording Studios become a destination for local and out of town bands. At the same time, EMAC also began producing commercials for radio and sound for television which allowed Robert to gain experience as a broadcast commercial producer.

In the wake of these improvements, EMAC Studios expanded to a new location in 1990. They purchased a Salvation Army Church at 432 Rectory Street and converted the building into a state of the art recording facility.

In 1995, Robert expanded his repertoire to include production sound, audio post-production, and location audio recording for television and film. He has traveled to many parts of the world including: Southeast Asia, France, and throughout the Caribbean to record audio onsite for Taste of life: A Gourmet Food Travel Show (Food Network) and High Point: Casinos of the World starring Kenny Rogers. Robert also worked as part of the Canadian Crew for Michael Moore’s Academy Award nominated movie Sicko.

In 2008, Robert worked as an audio post-production engineer recording dialogue for Christopher Plummer’s character in Pixar's Academy Award winning movie Up. Most recently, Robert mixed stereo and surround tracks for Cirque du Soleil's production of Corteo.

Robert is now an audio engineering professor at Fanshawe College in the Music Industry Arts program and continues to operate EMAC Studios. He is also the chair for the Producer of the Year selection committee for Canada’s Juno Awards and a member of the Audio Engineering Society.

== Selected works ==
- Kittie – Spit & Oracle
- Nicole Scott – Self Titled
- Glenn Bennett – I Like My Music With A Beat
- BURNusBOTH – Stray Bullets
- The Corndogs – Love is All
- '63 Monroe – Stinkin' Out The Joint
- Luddites – 86-91
- John James – Still The Beat Goes On
- Mettle - Mettle
- James Clark Institute - The Colour of Happy
- The Bookends - A Celtic Celebration
- Sheep Look Up - Sheep Look Up
- Cirque du Soleil - Corteo

== TV & Film ==
- Pixar's Up
- Michael Moore’s Sicko
- Anne of Green Gables: A New Beginning
- High Point: Casinos of the World
- Taste of Life: A Gourmet Food Travel Show

== See also ==
- EMAC Recording Studios
- Fanshawe College's Music Industry Arts program
- Joe Vaughan
