= No Baggage =

Studio album by Dolores O'Riordan
- Released: 21 August 2009
- Studio: EMAC Recording Studios
- Length: 45:16
- Label: Cooking Vinyl; Rounder
- Producer: Dolores O'Riordan; Dan Brodbeck

Dolores O'Riordan chronology
Are You Listening? (2007)	No Baggage (2009)

Singles from No Baggage
- 1. "The Journey" Released: July 2009; 2. "Switch Off the Moment" Released: October 2009

Professional ratings
Aggregate scores
Source	Rating
Metacritic	47/100
Review scores
Source	Rating
AllMusic	3.5/5 stars
Aversion	3/5 stars

No Baggage is the second and final solo studio album by Irish musician Dolores O'Riordan. It was released on 21 August 2009 in Ireland, most of the world on 24 August 2009 and on 25 August 2009 in North America. The first single, "The Journey" was released to radio on 13 July in North America and on 10 August in Europe.

It includes a new version of "Apple of My Eye", a song featured on O'Riordan's debut solo album, Are You Listening?.

On the week beginning 27 August 2009 No Baggage entered the Irish Albums Chart at number 80. In 2010 it was awarded a silver certification from the Independent Music Companies Association, which indicated sales of at least 30,000 copies throughout Europe.

Producer Dan Brodbeck won the 2010 Juno Award for Recording Engineer of the Year for his work on the songs "Apple of My Eye" and "Be Careful" from No Baggage. The second single is "Switch Off the Moment". The music video for "The Journey" was filmed in 16 mm, at Howth Beach Pier and Howth Summit, Dublin, Ireland, on 8 May 2009. The music video aired on 29 July 2009.

== Critical reception ==
No Baggage received mixed or average reviews upon its release, receiving a 47/100 critic score on Metacritic. Some critics found merit in the record, with Sputnikmusic noting that it shows O'Riordan "building on old strengths, while broadening her artistic scope farther than it's been in thirteen years".

The majority of critics, however, dismissed the record. The Boston Globe remarked that the album "is undone by a batch of not-so-great songs. [O'Riordan] wallows in more melodrama than might be expected, while trying to be self-consciously profound," while Uncut magazine simply commented, "It's grisly."

Sarah Moore from PopMatters stated that "she gives her yodels a certain sheen, and combined with the background vocals they sort of gloss across the refrains".

AllMusic's Stephen Thomas Erlewine gave the album a three-and-a-half-out-of-five-stars, exclaiming that,

"Yes, this is instantly recognizable as her music—not just in that voice, but its blend of folk-rock and sighing, spacy rock that splits the difference between U2 and David Gilmour-led Pink Floyd—but No Baggage is bigger, brighter than Are You Listening? and as the album starts to hit its stride halfway through, she weaves in increasingly varied instrumentations, sometimes delving into pure worldbeat influence but more often using all these sounds as coloring on crisp, cheerful adult pop".

== Track listing ==
Finalized track list as revealed on O'Riordan's official website:

All lyrics are written by Dolores O'Riordan; all music is composed by O'Riordan, except tracks 6 and 9, which are by O'Riordan and Dan Brodbeck.

No.	Title	Length
1.	"Switch Off the Moment"	3:18
2.	"Skeleton"	3:24
3.	"It's You"	4:11
4.	"The Journey"	3:52
5.	"Stupid"	4:45
6.	"Be Careful"	4:20
7.	"Apple of My Eye" (New Version)	4:47
8.	"Throw Your Arms Around Me"	4:26
9.	"Fly Through"	3:54
10.	"Lunatic"	4:28
11.	"Tranquilizer"	3:51
Total length:		45:16

iTunes bonus tracks
No.	Title	Length
12.	"You Set Me on Fire"	4:22
13.	"Track by Track" (Dolores discusses each of the tracks on the album)	6:31
Total length:		56:09

US iTunes bonus track
No.	Title	Length
12.	"Loser" (New Version)	2:59
Total length:		48:15

== Band members ==
- Dolores O’Riordan – vocals, piano
- Dan Brodbeck – guitar; bass on "The Journey"
- Marco Mendoza – bass except on "The Journey"
- Denny DeMarchi – piano
- Ger Farrell – drums except on "Stupid"
- Steve DeMarchi – guitar on "Stupid"
- Corey Thompson – drums on "Stupid", percussion on "Throw Your Arms Around Me"
- Matt Grady – digeridoo

== Charts ==
Chart (2009)	Peak position
Belgian Albums (Ultratop Flanders)	75
Belgian Albums (Ultratop Wallonia)	31
French Albums (SNEP)	30
German Albums (Offizielle Top 100)	77
Irish Albums (IRMA)	80
Italian Albums (FIMI)	6
Spanish Albums (Promusicae)	48
Swiss Albums (Schweizer Hitparade)	25
