= Are You Listening? (album) =

2007 studio album by Dolores O'Riordan

Studio album by Dolores O'Riordan
- Released: 4 May 2007
- Studios: EMAC Recording Studios (Ontario); Metalworks Studios (Ontario)
- Genres: Alternative rock; pop rock; hard rock
- Length: 51:42
- Labels: Sequel, Sanctuary
- Producers: Dolores O'Riordan; Dan Brodbeck; Youth; Richard Cycki

Dolores O'Riordan chronology
Are You Listening? (2007)	No Baggage (2009)

Singles from Are You Listening?
- 1. "Ordinary Day" Released: February 2007; 2. "When We Were Young" Released: August 2007

Professional ratings
Review scores
Source	Rating
AllMusic	3.5/5 stars
Aversion	3/5 stars
Bullz-Eye.com	3/5 stars

Are You Listening? is the debut solo studio album by Irish musician Dolores O'Riordan. It was released on 4 May 2007 in Ireland, 7 May 2007 across Europe, and 15 May 2007 in North America. The first single, "Ordinary Day", was released in late April. The "Ordinary Day" video was shot in the city of Prague. The second single was "When We Were Young". O'Riordan embarked on the Are You Listening? Tour in May 2007.

== Production and development ==
After the release of the band's compilation album Stars: The Best of 1992–2002, O'Riordan told her band mates that she had decided to take a break to go on a journey of discovery. She wanted to find out "who [she] was without The Cranberries". On a personal mission to "experience real life" and "some grounding" due to feeling under pressure, O'Riordan took four years to write new songs as a hobby, as well as spend time with her family. She wrote 32 songs and chose 12 for the album. O'Riordan started composing the songs at home on the piano, and brought a programmer to the house to work on ProTools. Once she had a few songs that had reached this stage of development, she went to a bigger studio to work with other musicians. Dolores emphasized the relaxed and freeing way of creating the record, stating that she "didn't rush it" and that "there was no structure on how it would be written". She experienced it as a contrast to her work with The Cranberries.

At the time, O'Riordan called Are You Listening? her most personal work yet. The Cranberries would reunite in 2009 and disbanded in 2019, following O'Riordan's death in 2018.

== Songs ==
"Ordinary Day" is both the first song on the album and was the first single. Described by the singer as "breezy" and "uplifting", it was inspired by the birth of O'Riordan's daughter and getting "flashes" of herself when she was a child by observing her daughter. O'Riordan said the song is also "about being positive" and not letting insecurities change your perspective on life.

"When We Were Young" is another song inspired by childhood. Lyrically, this song deals with looking back at one's childhood and being appreciative and grateful.

In the song "Human Spirit", O'Riordan was interested in exploring who she really was without the label of "famous singer". She called the song "particularly rewarding" as it related to her self-discovery process, which had a "rejuvenating effect". This song features the tin whistle, played by O'Riordan who found it to suit the song.

"Stay with Me" is a song in which O'Riordan experimented with dark guitar chords and an "unpredictable" chorus. Lyrically, it deals with O'Riordan's father who had cancer and the fears the singer was dealing with in regards to it.

"Apple of My Eye" was the first song written out of the twelve songs that were chosen for the album. It was written about the singer's husband and appeared in another version on her second and final solo album No Baggage. She described it as a "simple song" about loving someone.

O'Riordan said that the song "Black Widow" was written "on a particularly sad day in October". This is another song on the album that deals with the subject of cancer. It was written as a reflection on O'Riordan's mother-in-law's death from the illness shortly after The Cranberries went on hiatus. Containing an eerie piano melody, the song is another one that was described by O'Riordan as being "experimental" in its creative process, also using the word "intricate".

The closing track "Ecstasy" deals with issues such as depression, drug addiction and suicide. O'Riordan said that it is not an autobiographical song but rather deals with how everybody has their own journey and needs to face their issues and open up to other human beings.

== Critical reception ==
At AllMusic, Stephen Thomas Erlewine states that the album "returns O'Riordan to her strengths: melodic, atmospheric, mildly brooding pop—Are You Listening is a success as a solo debut: it doesn't resurrect O'Riordan's earliest work as much as reconnect with it, and she hasn't sounded this purposeful, or made a record this satisfying, since the days of "Linger".

Caroline Sullivan of The Guardian gave the album four out of five stars and wrote that "the lofty hooklines - like the majestic belter that makes you sit up straight during "Ordinary Day" - are stirring stuff, and enhanced by the silvery and uncharacteristic "Black Widow".

== Track listing ==
All tracks are written by Dolores O'Riordan.

No.	Title	Length
1.	"Ordinary Day"	4:05
2.	"When We Were Young"	3:24
3.	"In the Garden"	4:28
4.	"Human Spirit"	4:01
5.	"Loser"	2:58
6.	"Stay with Me"	4:02
7.	"Apple of My Eye"	4:44
8.	"Black Widow"	4:56
9.	"October"	4:38
10.	"Accept Things"	4:11
11.	"Angel Fire"	5:02
12.	"Ecstasy"	5:13
Total length:		51:42

Japan bonus tracks
No.	Title	Length
13.	"Letting Go"	5:47
14.	"Forever"	4:08
15.	"Sisterly Love"	2:35

iTunes bonus track
No.	Title	Length
13.	"Willow Pattern"	4:18

Outtakes
No.	Title	Length
1.	"Croatia"	5:16
2.	"Playground"
3.	"Watch the Stars"
4.	"Stupid"	3:58

== Band members ==
- Dolores O'Riordan – vocals, tin whistle
- Steve DeMarchi – guitar, backing vocals
- Denny DeMarchi – keyboards, guitars, flute, wind instruments, backing vocals
- Marco Mendoza – bass guitar, backing vocals
- Graham Hopkins – drums, percussion, backing vocals

== Charts ==
Chart (2007)	Peak position
Australian Albums (ARIA)	58
Belgian Albums (Ultratop Flanders)	38
Belgian Albums (Ultratop Wallonia)	21
Dutch Albums (Album Top 100)	82
European Top 100 Albums (Billboard)	11
French Albums (SNEP)	11
German Albums (Offizielle Top 100)	39
Irish Albums (IRMA)	15
Italian Albums (FIMI)	2
Spanish Albums (Promusicae)	26
Swedish Albums (Sverigetopplistan)	40
Swiss Albums (Schweizer Hitparade)	10
UK Albums (Official Charts)	28
US Billboard 200	77
US Top Rock Albums (Billboard)	23
