= Fold A to B =

Album

Fold A To B

Studio album by The Salads
- Released: 2003
- Recorded: EMAC Recording Studios
- Length: 52:38
- Label: Maui Wowie
- Producer: Dan Brodbeck; The Salads

The Salads chronology
Who's That? E.P.	Fold A To B	Australian Sampler

Professional ratings
Review scores
Source	Rating
Allmusic	2/5 stars

Fold A to B is the second full-length album by Canadian punk rock band The Salads. It was released in 2003, on Maui Wowie Records, and distributed by EMI Music Canada. It is an enhanced CD, and features the videos for both "Get Loose", and "Who's that Kat?". The title of the album is a reference to the Mad Fold-in by Mad magazine and the font of the album cover title is a reference to the magazine as well.

Recorded in the fall of 2002, this album was The Salads' breakthrough album. It spawned three hit singles, "Get Loose", "The Roth Kung Fu", and "Unhappy", which were all radio hits in Canada. the first single, "Get Loose", was featured in a few Labatt Blue commercials, and was the most successful single from this album, and got steady play on MuchMusic upon its release. It was also on the soundtrack and film score to EuroTrip. The band was also featured playing the song in the second episode of Instant Star. This song along with "The Roth Kung Fu" were featured in the sixth season of Degrassi: The Next Generation.

== Reception ==
Jason MacNeil of AllMusic gave the album a mixed two star review. He compared its sound to early Red Hot Chili Peppers and said "at times, the Salads also have the same style as Incubus, veering back and forth between hard rock and a melodic chorus."

== Track listing ==
All lyrics are written by Darren Dumas, except where noted; all music is composed by The Salads (Dave Ziemba, Darren Dumas, Chuck Dailey, and Grant Taylor), except where noted.

No.	Title	Lyrics	Music	Length
1.	"Get Loose"			2:24
2.	"Free Your Pain"			2:59
3.	"Unhappy"	Dumas; Taylor; Dailey	The Salads; Dan Brodbeck	3:42
4.	"The Roth Kung Fu"	Dumas; Dailey; Taylor		2:35
5.	"Time 4 Change"			3:02
6.	"Who's That Kat?"			3:16
7.	"2 Kool 4 Skool"			2:53
8.	"Forever & A Day"			2:59
9.	"Why It Gotta Be" (featuring Skitz)	Dumas; Vaughn Bramble	The Salads; Skitz	3:23
10.	"Who We Are"			2:56
11.	"Whachewlookinah?! (woop woop)"			2:29
12.	"Come Around"			19:59

- A hidden track is featured after Come Around.

== Personnel ==
The Salads

- Chuck Dailey – bass guitar, backing vocals
- Libydo – dancer, backing vocals
- Mista D – vocals
- Dave Ziemba – guitar
- Grant Taylor – drums, backing vocals

Technical personnel

- Dan Brodbeck – producer, engineer, mixing, mastering
- Siegfried Meier - assistant engineer, mastering

== Source of name ==
- The booklet for this disc features a fold-in, to support the name of the album. When folded, it shows the band's answer to many suggestions that they change their name. Inspired by a similar regular feature in Mad.
