= Kicking in the Water =

Studio album by The Gandharvas
- Released: September 1, 1995
- Genre: Alternative rock
- Label: Watch Music

The Gandharvas chronology
| A Soap Bubble and Inertia (1994) | Kicking in the Water (1995) | Sold for a Smile (1997) |

Professional ratings
Review scores
| Source | Rating |
|---|---|
| Allmusic | 3/5 stars |

Kicking in the Water is the second album by Canadian band The Gandharvas. It was released in 1995 on the Watch Music record label. The album featured the singles "Drool" and "The Masochistic Minstrel", both of which have music videos.

== Track listing ==
1. "Drool" – 4:06
2. "The Masochistic Minstrel" – 4:15
3. "The Very Thing" – 4:43
4. "A Quick Feel" – 6:00
5. "Two at a Table Set for Three" – 4:07
6. "Landing" – 3:46
7. "Hollow You Out" – 3:25
8. "Held to the Ground" – 5:09
9. "Kicking in the Water" – 3:47
10. "i-i-i (a wave)" – 4:12
11. "Got You Alone" – 2:32
