= Sold for a Smile =

Studio album by The Gandharvas
- Released: August 26, 1997 (Canada); May 19, 1998 (International)
- Recorded: Idea of East, Halifax, Nova Scotia
- Genre: Alternative rock
- Length: 39:02
- Label: Watch Music, MCA
- Producer: Laurence Currie, The Gandharvas

The Gandharvas chronology
Kicking in the Water (1995)	Sold for a Smile (1997)

Professional ratings
Review scores
Source	Rating
Allmusic	4/5 stars

Sold for a Smile is the third and final album by Canadian rock band The Gandharvas. It was released in 1997 in Canada on the Watch Music record label, and in 1998 internationally on MCA Records. By April 1998, the album had sold 21,000 units in Canada. The 1998 MCA release includes a cover version of Cyndi Lauper's song "Time After Time" and a re-recorded version of The Gandharvas' 1994 hit "The First Day of Spring".

== Singles ==
The album's lead single, "Downtime", was a hit in Canada and was also the band's only single to chart in the United States. "Watching the Girl" was released as the second single from the album.

== Track listing ==
All songs written by the Gandharvas.

1. "Downtime" – 4:06
2. "Gonna Be So Loose" – 3:41
3. "Shells" – 2:06
4. "Waiting for Something to Happen/Reprise" – 6:01
5. "Hammer in a Shell" – 3:06
6. "Watching the Girl" – 3:13
7. "Sarsaparilla" – 4:16
8. "Into the Mainstream" – 4:26
9. "Milk Ocean" – 4:08
10. "Diaboloney" – 3:10

== Personnel ==
- Paul Jago – vocals
- Tim McDonald – drums
- Jud Ruhl – guitar
- Brian Ward – guitar
- Beau Cook – bass, keyboards
- Laurence Currie – producer, engineer, mixing
- George Graves – mastering
- Ross Munro – executive producer
- Jason Darbyson – design, illustration
- Mike Richardson – design, illustration
- Richard Sibbald – photography
