= Headstrong (band) =

Canadian rock band

- Origin: London, Ontario, Canada
- Genres: Rap rock; nu metal; rap metal
- Years active: 1998–2003
- Label: RCA
- Past members: Matt Kinna; Jon Cohen; Joel Krass; Brian Mathews; Richard Humpartzoomian

Headstrong was a Canadian rock band formed in 1998. They released one eponymous studio album under RCA Records before being dropped from the label and ultimately disbanding in 2003.

== Band history ==
Collectively, the band members all met in 1993 while Kinna, Krass, and Matthews were living in Saugeen-Maitland Hall at the University of Western Ontario and Cohen was completing the Music Industry Arts program at Fanshawe College. Among Cohen's classmates at the time was Greg Below, who would later go on to create Distort Entertainment. While Headstrong initially began in the late 1990s under the name bomb32 in London, Ontario, the group was formed of two long-standing pairings. Cohen and Krass had grown up friends in the Niagara Region, writing and performing under various incarnations since 1987, the two were greatly inspired by Living Colour, Guns N' Roses, Gwar, and much of the classic rock and modern punk era at the time. Kinna and Matthews had a slightly shorter, but similar relationship living in Toronto and attending the same summer-camp, they drew their inspiration from a like, but wider range of sources.

Comparable to acts such as 311, Stone Temple Pilots, Rage Against the Machine, and Helmet, they used the popularity of Farmclub to promote their music. The strength of their first single, "All of the Above," earned Headstrong over a million votes from fans of the television show's site. They became Farmclub's first international guest and were granted a performance at LA's Farmclub stage in the summer of 2000. While there, they shared the stage with the likes of Kid Rock and Eminem and caught the attention of David Bendeth, senior vice-president of A&R, who signed them afterwards. Headstrong then made their live American debut at the CMJ Music Marathon on October 12 at Don Hills, New York City. Also a key advocate of the band at RCA, was Bill Burrs, now Senior Sony-BMG Vice-President Promotions. The band's relationship with David could be described as frictional, as the label was in a constant state of interference with the band's ideals, perhaps rooted in their being Canadian with an American label partner in a notorious marketplace; but they could not deny that Bendeth had a great deal of influence in their improvement as players. The label itself was in a period of instability brought on by the creative destruction digitization would bring to the North American music industry. Headstrong could be remarked as one of the last acts to enter the analog market place, as the RIAA was beginning to align legislative forces against piracy in the form of Napster roughly at the time of their signing, certainly it was the backdrop to their courtship with the label. Headstrong did not 'win' Farmclub, nor were they signed on directly on the heels of the performance. Prior to their arrival to the taping, it was known that the band was on the radar of many in the Canadian and US industry before this performance as they were managed in part by Andy Martin of Deep South Entertainment in Raleigh, North Carolina.

Thanks to their booking agents S.L. Feldman & Associates, Headstrong then embarked on a Canadian tour with fellow Canadians Flybanger starting in November 2001. The group also found fast friends in Breach of Trust, The Salads, appearing together on many occasions throughout Southern Ontario, making Zaphod's Memorable Shows in Ottawa Ontario, November 30, 2001. On February 19, 2002, they released their self-titled debut under RCA. Headstrong managed to find success with its single "Adriana," which reached No. 15 on the Mainstream Rock Tracks and had a music video. However, problems began erupting within the following months, as J Records and existing RCA staff were consolidated through directive of parent company, BMG. In late July, Headstrong was pulled from touring with Tommy Lee in a decision reportedly made by RCA to end the band's tour support. By this time, Headstrong had also been believed to be writing and demoing new material which would possibly be showcased in their forthcoming fall concerts. However, in August, a mere six months after their debut album's release, Headstrong was dropped by RCA. The band's last performance US was alongside Atlanta, Georgia rock band Injected on the steps of the Capital Building at the Taste of Madison Festival in Madison, Wisconsin. The following year, in late April, Headstrong decided to split up, citing disillusionment with the record label as one reason. As one would expect, there is little contact between the band and their industry counterparts from the time, but the members maintain a unanimous fondness for Burrs and an almost Stockholm-ish opinion of Bendeth.

Prior to their exit from the music industry the band left behind several tracks for their fans, which they produced from the remains of their funds, also with longtime friend Producer, and at the time only advocate, Dan Brodbeck. "False Start", "How White", and "Muchas Gracias".

Headstrong have since gone on to become teachers, academics and media professionals in the GTA, Ontario, Canada. The band most recently reunited under pseudonym (The Legendary Castaways) to celebrate front-man Kinna's marriage, performing two-shows, one with The Salads at the Hard Rock Café in Toronto, Ontario.

== Discography ==
=== Studio albums ===
- Headstrong (2002)

=== Singles ===
- "All of the Above" (2001)
- "Adriana" (2002)
