= Raven Quinn =

American musician, singer and songwriter

Raven Quinn is an American musician, singer and songwriter. Her first self-titled album was released March 4, 2010. Quinn released the title track "Not In Vain" from her sophomore album on October 31, 2013, with the full second album Not In Vain seeing release on October 6, 2014. On December 8, 2015, Raven Quinn released The Acoustic EP, containing acoustic versions of songs from her first two albums.

== Career ==
Raven Quinn released her first solo album, Raven Quinn, through Corvus Entertainment on March 4, 2010. The album was produced with Dan Brodbeck. Within hours of release it became a number one on Amazon's "Movers and Shakers" charts and held top 100 chart positions in Amazon.com's Rock and MP3 album charts within the first twelve hours of release.

In December 2012, Quinn released a digital EP entitled Demos & Rarities Part I a collection of demo recordings and previously unreleased tracks which were recorded during the making of her debut album. In October 2013, Quinn released the title track "Not In Vain" from her second album.

October 6, 2014 Quinn's sophomore effort Not In Vain was released. Pairing up again with producer Dan Brodbeck, Not In Vain joined her 2010 self-titled release in the top of the Amazon.com's Movers and Shakers, Rock, and Pop sales charts.

in 2015, Quinn's acoustic EP, a compilation of acoustic tracks from her first two albums, was released on December 8 with proceeds benefiting the Cancer Research Collaboration, an organization formed by Breastlink, where Quinn was treated for invasive ductal carcinoma.

- Raven Quinn – all vocals
- George Lynch – guitars
- Josh Freese – drums
- Blair Sinta – drums
- Aaron Embry – piano and pads
- Dan Brodbeck – guitars, bass and keyboards

== Discography ==
Album:

- Raven Quinn (2010)
- Demos & Rarities Part I (2012)
- Not in Vain (2014)
- The Acoustic EP (2015)

Singles:

- Not in Vain (2013)

Other appearances:

- The Window (Rock Band song)
- Decadence (Rock Band song)
- Catalyst (Rock Band song)
