= Ivory Hours =

Canadian indie pop band

- Origin: London, Ontario, Canada
- Genre: Indie rock
- Years active: 2012–present
- Members: Luke Roes; Chris Levesque; Thomas Perquin
- Website: http://www.ivoryhours.com/

Ivory Hours is a Canadian indie pop band from London, Ontario. In 2018, the band members are guitarist and singer Luke Roes, Bassist Chris Levesque, and Drummer Thomas Perquin.

== History ==
Ivory Hours was founded in 2012 by brother and sister Luke and Annie Roes. The band released their full-length debut album Morning Light on June 9, 2015. The album was produced by Dan Brodbeck and engineered by João Carvalho. In the summer of 2015, the band won CFNY 102.1 the Edge's Next Big Thing contest out of 442 bands from across Canada.

The following autumn, Ivory Hours were the Grand Prize winners of Canada's Walk of Fame's Emerging Artist Music Mentorship Program which awarded the band $25,000, studio time, and a performance during Canada's Walk of Fame events. The band were also finalists in CBC Music's Searchlight competition, eventually placing fourth.

Their first single from Morning Light, "Warpaint", garnered significant airplay across Canada and charted on CBC Radio 2's Radio 2 Top 20.

In the winter of 2016, Ivory Hours did their first cross-Canada tour in support of Morning Light.

Ivory Hours has opened for Sloan, and shared the stage with other notable Canadian bands including Matthew Good, The Zolas, Awolnation, and City and Colour.

== Discography ==
- Two Keys (2013)
- Mary (2014)
- Morning Light (2015)
- Dreamworld (2017)
