= Downtime (The Gandharvas song) =

Single by The Gandharvas

from the album Sold for a Smile
- Released: 1997
- Genre: Alternative rock
- Length: 4:09
- Label: MCA

The Gandharvas singles chronology
""The Masochistic Minstrel"" (1996)	"Downtime" (1997)	""Watching the Girl"" (1997)

"Downtime" is a song by Canadian alternative rock band The Gandharvas. It was released in 1997 as the lead single from the band's third and final album, Sold for a Smile. The song was a hit in Canada and was the band's only song to chart in the United States. The song was among the 98 most played songs on active rock radio stations in the US in 1998.

== Appearances in other media ==
It was featured in the Canadian television film The Girl Next Door (1998), which starred Gary Busey.

== Charts ==
Chart (1997/1998)	Peak position
Canada Alternative (RPM)	8
US Active Rock (Billboard)	34
US Alternative (Radio & Records)	34
