= Ordinary Day (Dolores O'Riordan song) =

- CD single cover

Single by Dolores O'Riordan

from the album Are You Listening?
- Released: February 2007
- Genre: Alternative rock
- Length: 4:04 (album version); 3:40 (radio edit)
- Label: Sanctuary
- Songwriter: Dolores O'Riordan

Dolores O'Riordan singles chronology
"Ordinary Day" (2007)	"When We Were Young" (2007)

"Ordinary Day" is the lead single taken from Dolores O'Riordan's debut album, Are You Listening?. The single was the most added AAA track on US radio stations. The single peaked at number 2 in Italy, number 1 in Croatia and number 10 in Lebanon.

== Music video ==
The music video was directed by Caswell Cloggins and was filmed in Prague. It features a little girl somewhat resembling Little Red Riding Hood. The music video debuted on 17 March 2007 on the Spanish music channel and radio Los 40 principales, and peaked at #27 on their music countdown.

== Cranberries version ==
O'Riordan sometimes sang the song live in concerts with The Cranberries. The Cranberries perform "Ordinary Day" in a 2010 concert in Chile that was filmed for television. The Cranberries also performed the song at a 2012 London concert, and this version is available on their live album, Live at the Hammersmith Apollo, London 2012.

== Track listing ==
CD single
(5 016073 901002; 30 April 2007)

1. Ordinary Day – 4:04
2. Without You – 4:08
3. Ordinary Day (Video) – 3:54

7" single
(5 016073 901071; 30 April 2007)

1. Ordinary Day – 4:04
2. Forever – 3:40

USA iTunes single
(13 March 2007)

1. Ordinary Day – 4:05
2. Black Widow – 4:56
3. Letting Go – 5:45

== Charts ==
Chart	Position
Belgium (Ultratip Bubbling Under Flanders)	18
Croatia	1
Ireland (IRMA)	50
Italy (FIMI)	2
Lebanon	10
Poland	8
Turkey	14
United Kingdom	106
US Adult Alternative Airplay (Billboard)	28
