= Dolores O'Riordan =

Irish musician (1971–2018)

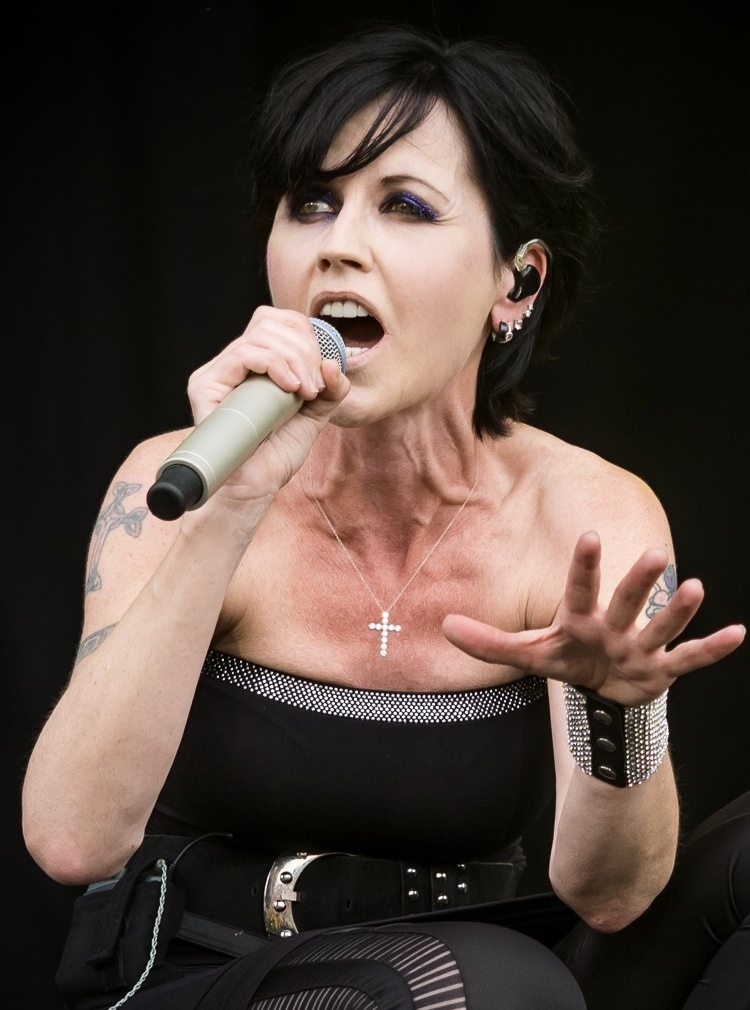
- O'Riordan performing in 2016
- Born: Dolores Mary Eileen O'Riordan; 6 September 1971; Ballybricken, County Limerick, Ireland
- Died: 15 January 2018 (aged 46); London, England
- Burial place: Caherelly Cemetery, Ballybricken
- Occupations: Musician; singer; songwriter
- Years active: 1989–2018
- Spouse: Don Burton (m. 1994; div. 2014)
- Children: 3
- Musical career
- Genres: Alternative rock; indie rock; jangle pop; pop rock; post-punk
- Instruments: Vocals; guitar; keyboards
- Labels: Sanctuary; Cooking Vinyl
- Formerly of: The Cranberries; D.A.R.K.
- Website: doloresoriordanofficial.com

Dolores Mary Eileen O'Riordan (/oʊˈrɪərdən/ oh-REER-dən; 6 September 1971 – 15 January 2018) was an Irish singer, songwriter and multi-instrumentalist who achieved international fame as the lead vocalist of the rock band the Cranberries. O'Riordan was the principal songwriter of the band and also played acoustic and electric guitars. She became one of the most recognisable voices in alternative rock and was known for her lilting mezzo-soprano voice, signature yodel, use of keening, and strong Limerick accent.

O'Riordan was born in County Limerick, Ireland, to a Catholic working-class family. She began performing as a soloist in her church choir before leaving secondary school to join the Cranberries in 1990. The band released the number-one album Everybody Else Is Doing It, So Why Can't We? in 1993; that album was followed by No Need to Argue (1994), To the Faithful Departed (1996), Bury the Hatchet (1999), and Wake Up and Smell the Coffee (2001). The Cranberries went on hiatus in 2003. During the hiatus, O'Riordan released two solo studio albums: Are You Listening? (2007) and No Baggage (2009). The Cranberries reunited in 2009, released Roses (2012), and went on a world tour. O'Riordan's other activities included appearing as a judge on RTÉ's The Voice of Ireland (2013–2014) and recording material with the trio D.A.R.K. (2014). The Cranberries' seventh album, Something Else (2017), was the last to be released during her lifetime.

Throughout her life, O'Riordan suffered from depression and the pressure of her own success; she was diagnosed with bipolar disorder in 2015. O'Riordan died from drowning due to alcohol intoxication in January 2018 at the age of 46. After her death, the Cranberries released the Grammy-nominated album In the End (2019), which featured her final vocal recordings; the group then disbanded. With the Cranberries, O'Riordan sold more than 40 million albums worldwide during her lifetime; that total increased to almost 50 million albums worldwide as of 2019. She was honoured with the Ivor Novello International Achievement award. In the months following her death, O'Riordan was named "The Top Female Artist of All Time" on Billboard's Alternative Songs chart.

== Early life and education ==
Dolores Mary Eileen O'Riordan was born on 6 September 1971 in Ballybricken in County Limerick, Ireland, the youngest of nine children, two of whom died in infancy. Her father, Terence Patrick "Terry" O'Riordan (1937–2011), worked as a farm labourer until a motorbike accident in 1968 left him brain damaged. Her mother, Eileen (née Greensmith), was a school caterer. O'Riordan was raised in a devout Roman Catholic family, and was named by her mother in reference to the Lady of the Seven Dolours.

O'Riordan was singing before she could talk. When she was five years of age, the principal of her school took her into the sixth class, sat her on the teacher's desk, and told her to sing for the twelve-year-old students in the class. She started with traditional Irish music and playing the Irish tin whistle when she went to school.

When O'Riordan was seven years old, her sister accidentally burned the family house down. The family's rural community was able to raise funds to purchase a new homestead for them. O'Riordan's formative experiences were as a liturgical soloist in the choir in a local church and as a singer at school. From the age of eight, she was sexually abused for four years by a person whom she trusted. At the age of ten, she sang in local pubs where her uncles took her.

O'Riordan attended Laurel Hill Coláiste FCJ school in Limerick. School principal Aedín Ní Bhriain said in the Limerick Post about O'Riordan's first day at Laurel Hill Coláiste at the age of twelve that she stood up in front of classmates and announced: "My name is Dolores O'Riordan and I'm going to be a rock star". She then stood on her chair and sang "Tra la la la la, Triangle". According to her school friend Catherina Egan, she was "boisterous, wild, but lovely". She regularly played the spoons and the bodhrán. At the age of twelve, O'Riordan began piano lessons, and then later, achieved Grade 4 in Practical and Grade 8 in Theory. She sat every day at the piano in the main hall to play, then her classmates sat around her after having lunch to listen to her sing. At age 17, she learned to play the guitar and performed a solo gig in Laurel Hill Coláiste secondary school. That same year, she met her first boyfriend, Mike O'Mahoney.

She described having a strict daily routine through her teenage years that consisted of going to piano lessons, going to church and doing homework. O'Riordan later admitted that she had neglected her school lessons in favour of writing music and songs, although at school she became head girl. Former principal Anne Mordan said in Nova about O'Riordan that she was a "delightful, unsophisticated, sensitive student, who enjoyed her time with us"; she described her as "a bright, kind, good-humoured girl, who loved her family, her friends, and had an easy relationship with all her teachers, both lay and FCJ sisters." During her six years at Laurel Hill Coláiste, O'Riordan won the Slógadh song contest almost every year, at several local events, and culminating in national singing competitions. In total she won 20 Slógadh medals.

Around this time, O'Riordan divided the rest of her schedule among assisting her mother, learning the accordion from her dad, and having part-time employment at clothing shops. Her mother, whom she "adored", encouraged her to consider becoming a nun or get a college degree and become a music teacher; instead, she ran away from home at 18 and lived a couple of years with her boyfriend. In an interview with Vox magazine, O'Riordan clarified her reasons for leaving home: "At 18 I left home because I wanted to sing. My parents wanted me to go to college and things like that. I was really poor for a year-and-a-half; I remember actually being hungry, like I'd die for a bag of chips. That's when I joined the Cranberries".

== Career ==
=== 1989–2003: Formation of the Cranberries, early success and stardom ===
In 1989, brothers Mike (bass) and Noel (guitar) Hogan formed the Cranberry Saw Us with drummer Fergal Lawler and singer Niall Quinn, in Limerick, Ireland. Less than a year later, Quinn left the band. (Note: When Niall Quinn left the band, brothers Mike and Noel Hogan and Fergal Lawler remained without a singer for more than six months; during that time, they were an instrumental band working on demos.) He then told the remaining members that his girlfriend knew a girl who was looking for a band playing original material.

In mid-1990, on a Sunday afternoon, O'Riordan and Quinn came to the band's rehearsal room. Noel Hogan later recalled that "Niall came up with Dolores on that Sunday and I remember she was shy, very soft-spoken. Not the Dolores that everyone grew to know. And she comes in and we're just kind of a gang of young guys sitting around the place. It must have been very, very intimidating for her". O'Riordan sang a couple of songs that she had written and she also did a Sinéad O'Connor song, "Troy". The band was impressed and gave her a cassette with instrumentals, asking her if she could work on it. When she returned with a rough version of "Linger", she was hired. Hogan told Rolling Stone that "the minute she sang, you know, it was like your jaw drops at her voice. Dolores was musically far superior to me, because she had been doing it all her life".

O'Riordan was still a student at Laurel Hill Coláiste FCJ secondary school when she first joined the band. She had set her sights on the musical life and her desire to be in "a band with no barriers, where I could write my own songs", she told The Guardian in 1995. At the time, she was doing her Leaving Certificate. Although her marks in school were good, academic study did not hold much interest for her. As a result, she left school without any qualifications.

The group recorded demo tapes, including Nothing Left at All, a three-track EP released on tape by local record label Xeric Records which sold 300 copies. The owner of Xeric Studios, Pearse Gilmore, became their manager and provided the group with studio time to complete another demo tape, which he produced. It featured early versions of "Linger" and "Dreams", which were sent to record companies in the UK. This demo gained attention from both the UK press and the record industry and sparked a bidding war among record labels. Eventually, the group signed with Island Records. The group changed their name to "the Cranberries" and released a four-track EP, Uncertain.

By then, O'Riordan was experiencing difficult touring conditions with low income, sleeping on people's floors and in cramped vans across Ireland and the UK. Furthermore, she had to overcome her shyness; during her early live performances with the Cranberries, she sang "with her back to the audience". Lawler recalled, "we just went up, and we had six songs. Dolores was turned to the side; Noel, Mike and I had our heads down". At this stage, she had spent eight years with classical piano, and had played the harmonium in her church for ten years. O'Riordan rapidly gained international attention after the release of the Cranberries' first album, Everybody Else Is Doing It, So Why Can't We?. It contained the group's most successful singles, "Dreams" and "Linger", which charted at No. 8 on the Billboard Hot 100 when she was only 22.

Early in 1994, O'Riordan injured her cruciate ligament in a ski accident in the Alps' Val-d'Isère and underwent major surgery. In September 1994, the Cranberries released "Zombie", the lead single of the follow-up album, No Need To Argue. The song reached No. 1 on Triple J's Hottest 100, which was the first time ever that a female-led band had topped Australia's biggest song poll. She stood alone in the countdown's history for 16 years. In terms of female-fronted acts, as of 2024, O'Riordan remains one of only four women to sing on a No. 1 song on the Hottest 100 ranking. (Note: It was not until 2010 that the countdown featured a female-fronted band in the No. 1 song, with Julia Stone and her brother Angus. In 2019, Billie Eilish became the first solo woman to win Triple J Hottest 100.) The Cranberries reached their commercial peak with No Need to Argue, the top-selling album worldwide in the first half of 1995 and the world's best-selling album of the year by a European artist. The album produced the songs "Ode to My Family", "I Can't Be with You", "Ridiculous Thoughts" and the group's biggest international hit, "Zombie", which topped singles charts in several countries. Dan Weiss of Billboard stated that "Zombie" "could crush an entire room with the combined largesse of O'Riordan's ocean-swallowing voice". By this time, O'Riordan had achieved both success and celebrity status.

O'Riordan's leg injury recurred unexpectedly and led to cancellation of the three concerts scheduled in Ireland for December 1994. This resulted in a press backlash, while the audience was more understanding, as O'Riordan had mentioned that the concerts were not cancelled but postponed until June 1995.

O'Riordan was recognised as a style icon. In the 1990s, she sported a pixie cut or buzzed hair and performing barefoot, saying that "it just feels comfortable and honest to pull your toes along the ground". Billboard's William Goodman described O'Riordan performing "Barefoot and strutting onstage, an Irish warrior poet with a bleached blonde pixie cut, gold chain necklace, singing without a flinch, as if it were ordained". The New York Times mentioned that O'Riordan was responsible for a large portion of Dr. Martens boots sales in the 1990s.

After attending a concert of the Cranberries at London's Royal Albert Hall in January 1995, author Alec Foege described O'Riordan as "part Audrey Hepburn, part David Bowie". On 23 March 1995, O'Riordan appeared on the cover of Rolling Stone magazine. On 12 September 1995, O'Riordan performed "Ave Maria" along with Luciano Pavarotti in his Pavarotti & Friends series of benefit concerts, entitled Together for the Children of Bosnia, which raised funds for War Child and the children of Bosnia, held in Modena, Italy. Princess Diana, who attended the live performance, told O'Riordan that the song brought her to tears. During the show, O'Riordan performed "Linger" as a duet with Simon Le Bon of Duran Duran.

The Cranberries' third album, To the Faithful Departed debuted at number two in the UK, and number four in the US, with the singles "Free to Decide", "When You're Gone" and "Hollywood". It also featured the Billboard Modern Rock Tracks number-one single "Salvation". Halfway through the Free To Decide World Tour 1996–97 promoting To the Faithful Departed, O'Riordan and the Cranberries canceled the remaining dates and announced that they would take time off in 1997. O'Riordan publicly told the Irish Examiner, "I was very depressed and I was extremely anorexic on that record, and as it came out I got progressively worse". O'Riordan was the one who made the decision to take a break; although their management and record company "went mental", the rest of the group supported her. Stephen Street later said that "perhaps she could have tempered her behavior and been more measured, but that wasn't her way."

On 12 November 1998, O'Riordan and Fergal Lawler presented the award for Best Song at the MTV Europe Music Awards, in Milan, Italy. On 11 December 1998, she performed live with the Cranberries at the Nobel Peace Prize Concert at Oslo Spektrum, Oslo, Norway.

The Cranberries released Bury the Hatchet in 1999. The album peaked at number one on both the Canadian Albums Chart and on the European Top 100 Albums, but did not match the commercial success of the group's first two albums. The world tour supporting the album, which started in April 1999 and lasted until July 2000, was the band's biggest tour ever.

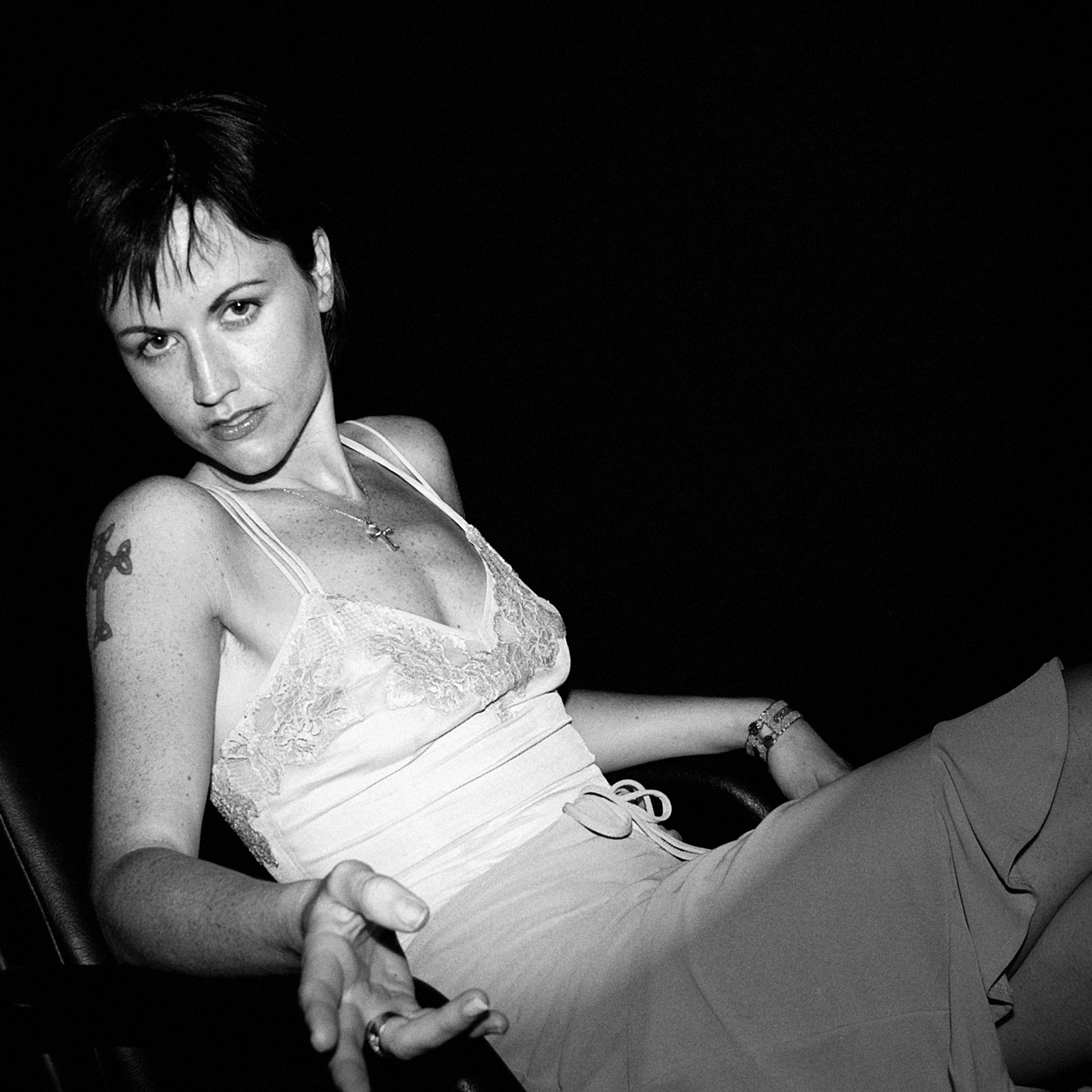
O'Riordan in 2001

Bury the Hatchet was quickly followed by O'Riordan's fifth effort with the group, Wake Up and Smell the Coffee. The album was released on 22 October 2001. On 15 December 2001, O'Riordan performed solo in the Vatican as part of the annual Vatican Christmas concert (Concerto di Natale) for Pope John Paul II. She sang "Analyse", "Panis angelicus", "Little Drummer Boy" and "Silent Night" with a 67-piece orchestra. The show was broadcast to well over 200 million people around the world.

On 7 February 2002, O'Riordan and the Cranberries announced in Dublin that they had donated all the proceeds from their single "Time Is Ticking Out" to the Chernobyl Children's Project. She was accompanied at the Clarence Hotel by Ali Hewson and by the founder and executive director of the Chernobyl Children's Project, Adi Roche. O'Riordan had written the song in spring 2001 after seeing images shared with her by Hewson and Roche of children born with congenital anomalies and illnesses caused by the Chernobyl nuclear disaster of 26 April 1986. O'Riordan explained, "I had just given birth to my second child, a beautiful healthy little girl. [ ... ] I had spoken with Ali on the subject before this, but I was so moved, almost to tears, that I wrote "Time Is Ticking Out"". On 14 December 2002 she received a second invitation to perform at the Vatican Christmas concert. O'Riordan sang "Linger", "Happy Xmas (War Is Over)" and "Adeste Fideles". Dolores was supported by the Millennium Symphony Orchestra on the three songs, directed by Renato Serio, and also by the Summertime Gospel Choir on "Adeste Fideles".

In June 2003, O'Riordan met AC/DC singer Brian Johnson when the Cranberries were playing concerts with AC/DC and the Rolling Stones on the latest leg of their Licks World Tour, and they considered the idea of working together. In mid-July 2003, the two friends started collaborating on material for a project that was intended to be the rock opera version of Helen Of Troy, complete with "rousing anthems, tender ballads and minimal dialogue". Johnson said he had been working on the project for about seven years and that the musical was expected to feature many artists. The $1.2 million production was initially to debut in March 2003 at the Van Wezel Performing Arts Hall in Florida. However, despite the pronouncement, the project was put on hold.

=== 2003–2009: Solo career and other projects ===
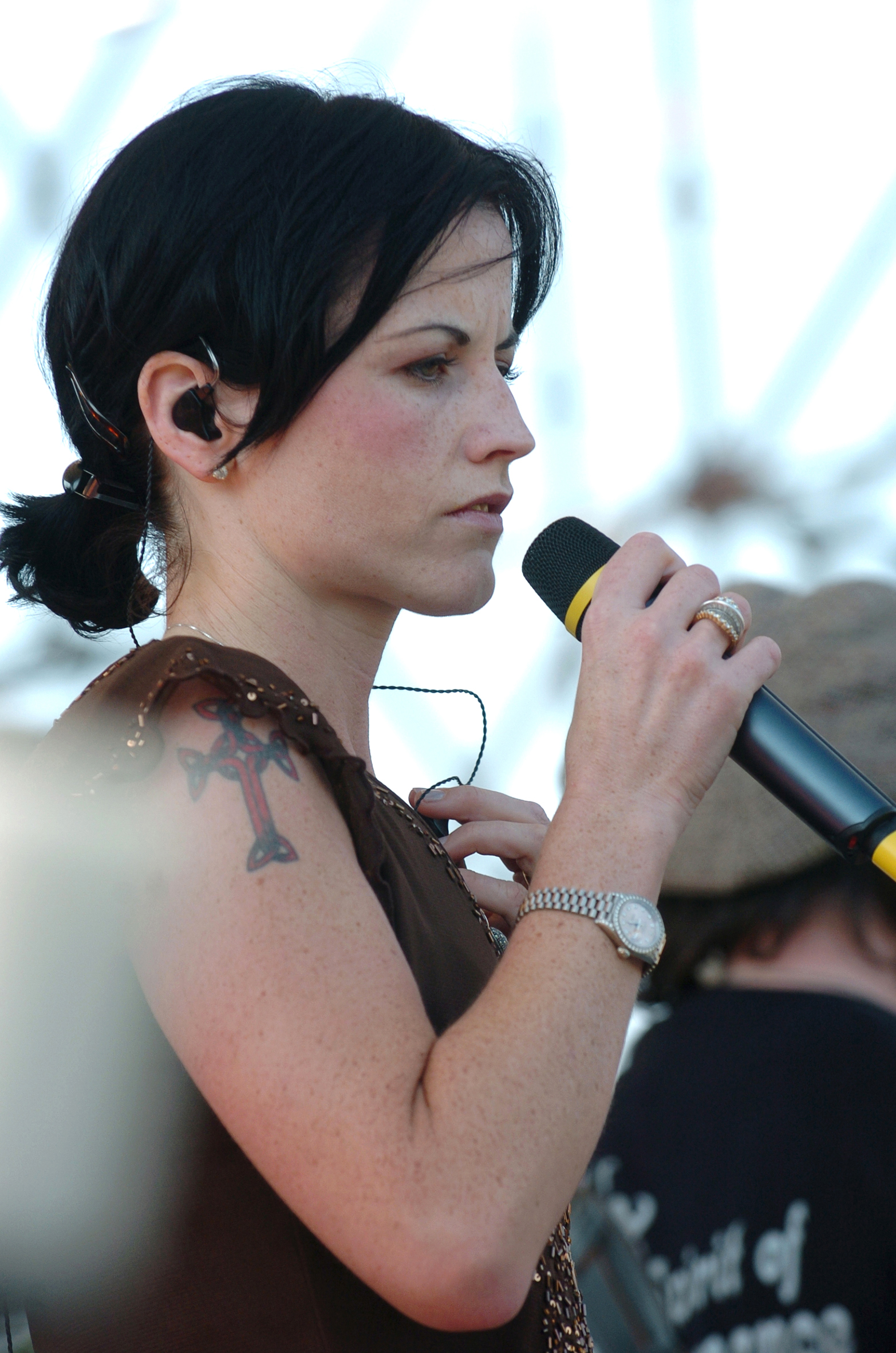
O'Riordan on stage during a soundcheck at Festivalbar in Italy in May 2004

In 2003, the Cranberries decided to take a temporary time-out to experiment with solo projects. O'Riordan stated that she had become a prisoner of her own celebrity and could not find a balance in her life. In The Independent, O'Riordan said she needed time not only to focus on her family and health, but also on her solo career.

In 2003, O'Riordan recruited Canadian music producer Dan Brodbeck and musicians to develop new compositions for a solo project. Among them was drummer Graham Hopkins, whom O'Riordan said she "loved for his energy". Also included were bassist Marco Mendoza, who had been a long time friend of O'Riordan and her husband; while Mendoza's father was a good friend of O'Riordan's father-in-law, as well as Steve DeMarchi as the main guitarist, who used to do live sessions with the Cranberries, along with his brother Denny DeMarchi who played keyboards and guitars for the band in the early 2000s. Brodbeck stated that their hiring was "100 per cent based on personalities clicking and musical tastes". The DeMarchi brothers' family had long been friends with Dolores O'Riordan's husband and their three children. In a Canadian newspaper, Denny DeMarchi said that she was "a perfectionist on tour"; occasionally during the show, she would turn to her musicians and canceled a particular song "in the moment". Although the technical crew was frustrated because they had to make various changes, understanding prevailed, saying that "she was emotionally not able to go there". As described by DeMarchi, "[f]or her, singing wasn't just something to deliver... it was a real experience."

"The Woodstrip / There's No Way Out"
"The Woodstrip / There's No Way Out" (2004), written by O'Riordan and Angelo Badalamenti, showcases part of her wide spectrum of musical expression.

"Mirror Lover"
Sample of "Mirror Lover" (2005), a collaboration between Dolores O'Riordan and Jam & Spoon.

On 6 March 2004, O'Riordan performed "Ave Maria" during the 54th International Song Festival at the Ariston Theater, Sanremo, in northern Italy. On 29 May 2004, O'Riordan performed during the first concert of the Festivalbar, in Milan, Italy. In 2004, she appeared with the Italian artist Zucchero on the album Zu & Co., with the song "Pure Love". In 2004, O'Riordan worked with composer Angelo Badalamenti of Twin Peaks fame on the Evilenko soundtrack, providing vocals on several tracks, including "Angels Go to Heaven", the film's theme song. Badalamenti later said that "she's a wonderful lyricist with an edge to her voice".

In 2005, she appeared on the Jam & Spoon's album Tripomatic Fairytales 3003 as a guest vocalist on the track "Mirror Lover". On 3 December 2005, O'Riordan made her third appearance at the Vatican's annual Christmas concert, where she performed "War Is Over", "Linger" and "Adeste Fideles" in a duet with Italian tenor Gian Luca Terranova.

In April 2006, O'Riordan signed a contract with Ciulla Management, based in Sherman Oaks, California. Prematurely before the release of her first solo album, the former Trent Reznor and Marilyn Manson mentor Tony Ciulla became her manager. She made a cameo appearance in the Adam Sandler comedy Click, released on 23 June 2006, as a wedding singer performing an alternate version of the Cranberries' "Linger", set to strings. On 9 December 2006, she would be invited at the Vatican Christmas concert which took place in Monte Carlo, as the concert which was to be held at the Vatican was canceled by the Pope Benedict XVI. She sang "Angel Fire" from her forthcoming solo album with an orchestra and Steve DeMarchi, along with "Away in a Manger" and "Happy Xmas (War Is Over)". In December 2006, Sanctuary Records signed O'Riordan for a solo record deal; of their recently signed artist, Julian Wall of Sanctuary Records noted that "Dolores comes to us with an immense international CV".

The music video for "Ordinary Day", directed by Caswell Coggins, was filmed in Prague, in February 2007. Are You Listening? was released in May 2007. The album entered and peaked at number 23 on the Billboard Top Rock Albums ranking, and number 77 on the Billboard 200. "Ordinary Day" was its first single, released in late April, and was produced by Martin "Youth" Glover. In August, "When We Were Young" was released as the second single from the album. Colm O'Hare of Hot Press averred that O'Riordan could have chosen to exploit the underlying sonorities of the Cranberries on Are you Listening? to keep her devotees waiting until the reunion, but instead, "she's done something far more ambitious by releasing this multi-layered collection of songs that traverses styles and genres". At that time, the couple split their time between Dublin and her husband's native Canada "surrounded by bears, wolves and all that great outdoor stuff", said O'Riordan.

O'Riordan performed live on television many times in 2007 in support of Are You Listening?. She travelled to over 22 countries in Europe, North America and South America on the 2007 O'Riordan world tour. On 21 March 2007, she performed on TV show Taratata in Paris, France. On 20 April 2007, O'Riordan made an appearance live on The Late Late Show on RTÉ in Dublin. On 16 May 2007, she appeared on Carson Daly's late-night show, Last Call with Carson Daly, in Burbank, California, in an episode that aired on 18 May 2007. She also appeared on 17 May 2007, on NBC's The Tonight Show with Jay Leno in Burbank, California, in an episode that aired on 19 May 2007. On 25 May 2007, O'Riordan performed during a live broadcast of Channel 7's Sunrise in Sydney, Australia. In May 2007 she played six songs acoustically at True Music with Katie Daryl on Hdnet in Los Angeles, California, in an episode that aired on 2 September 2007. The same month she performed on the Heaven and Earth Show aired on BBC One. On 29 June 2007, O'Riordan took to the stage of Festivalbar in Catania, Italy. On 2 August 2007, Sanctuary Records UK division ceased their activity and was acquired by UMG at about $88 million. O'Riordan commented, "they started off as a management company for Iron Maiden, maybe 25 years ago. But they've been around forever and now they've become a record company, and I thought, that looks grand and solid—they're indie and they'll be good. Jesus, six months into Are you Listening? they got bought out by Universal in the States...". On 19 November 2007, she cancelled the remainder of her European Tour (Lille, Paris, Luxembourg, Warsaw and Prague) due to illness. In December 2007, she performed in a few small American clubs, including Des Moines, Nashville, and Charlottesville, Virginia.

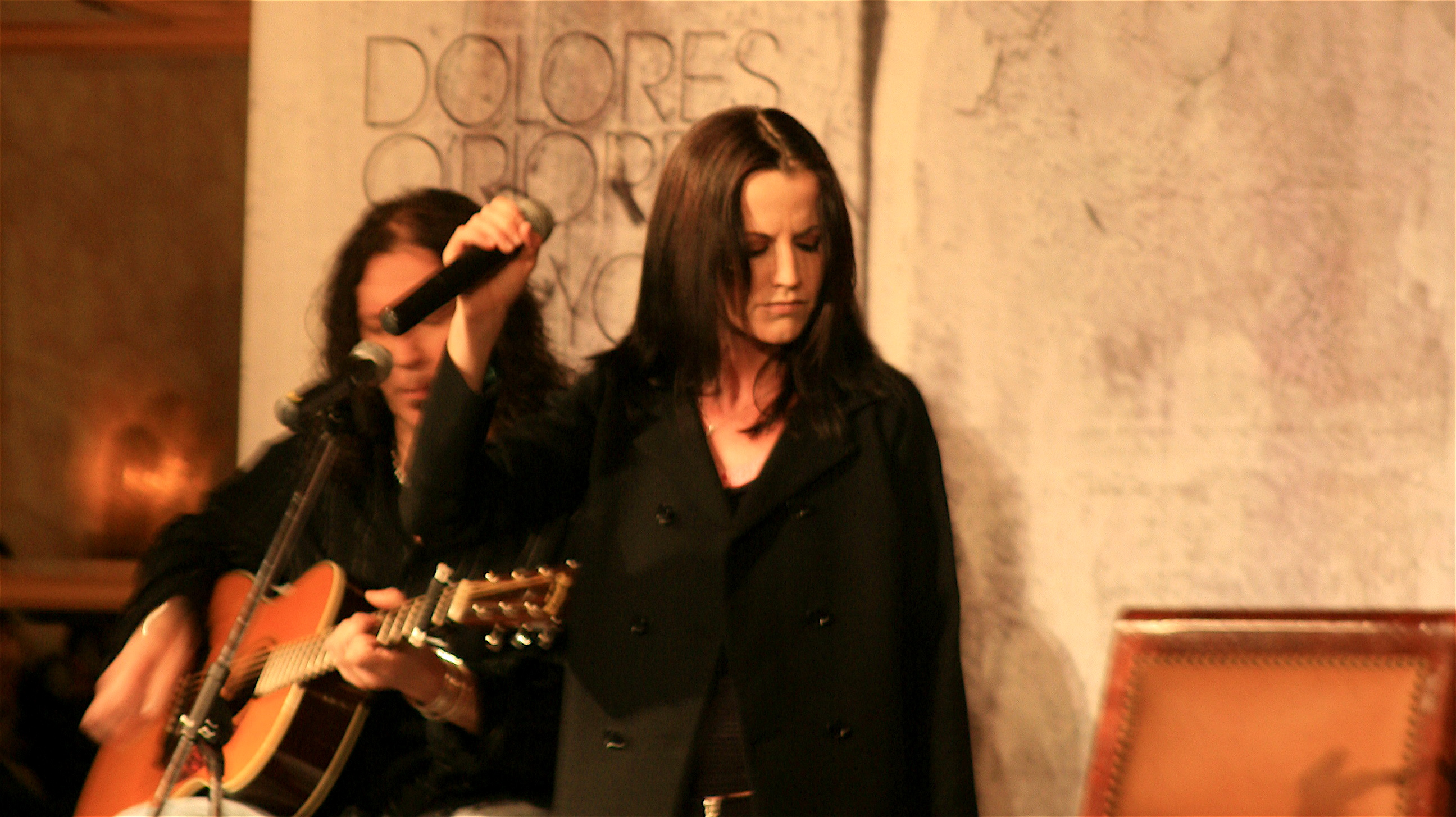
O'Riordan promoting her debut solo album Are You Listening? in 2007

In 2008, O'Riordan won an EBBA Award. Every year the European Border Breakers Awards recognize the success of ten emerging artists or groups who reached audiences outside their own countries with their first internationally released album in the past year.

In January 2009, the University Philosophical Society (Trinity College, Dublin) invited the Cranberries to reunite for a concert celebrating O'Riordan's appointment as an honorary member of the Society, which led the band members to consider reuniting for a tour and a recording session. Of the event, embracing her performance with the Cranberries, O'Riordan stated that "the minute we started playing it felt like we'd never stopped", pointing out that "it's a chemistry. It just fits". O'Riordan released her second album No Baggage, featuring 11 tracks, in August 2009. The first single "The Journey" was released on 13 July 2009, followed by a second single, "Switch Off the Moment". The music video for "The Journey" was directed by Robin Schmidt and filmed in 16 mm on 8 May 2009, at Howth Beach Pier and at Howth Summit, Dublin, Ireland. The music video aired on 29 July 2009. O'Riordan said of No Baggage "I probably haven't worn my heart on my sleeve like this since the second album No Need to Argue". Nevertheless, No Baggage was poorly received by music critics compared to Are you Listening?, and neither album replicated the success of the Cranberries.

=== 2009–2012: Comeback and Roses ===
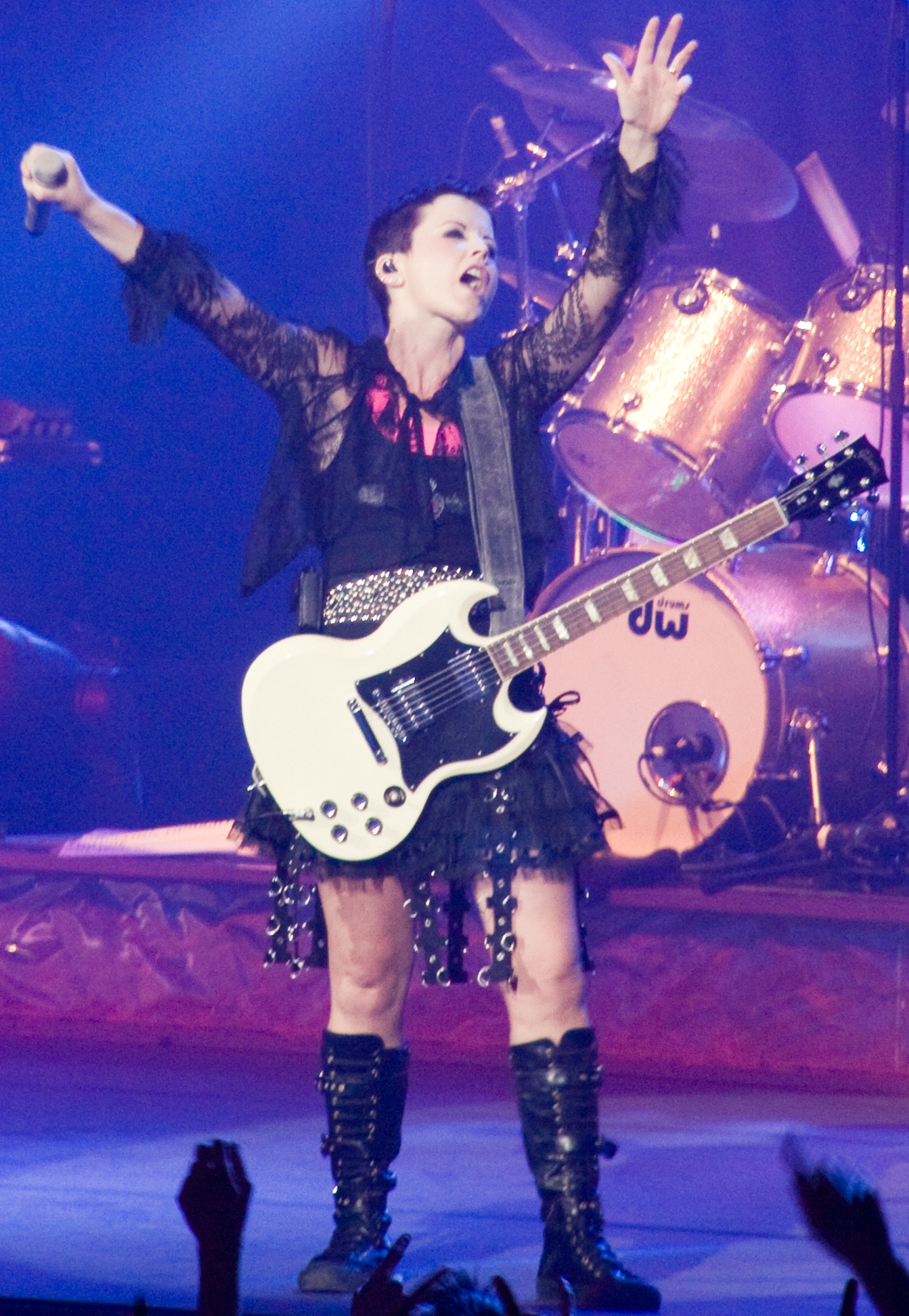
O'Riordan performing with her signature Gibson SG electric guitar in Paris in May 2010

On 25 August 2009, while promoting her solo album No Baggage in New York City on 101.9 RXP radio, O'Riordan announced the Cranberries Reunion World Tour of 107 concerts. O'Riordan reported that she had thought about how much she missed the band before making the decision to tour again. She added that Lawler and the two Hogan brothers were "a big part of my heart and soul". O'Riordan and the Cranberries allowed their songs "Dreams", "Empty" along with "Apple Of My Eye" and "Stupid", to feature in the film released in the US in October 2013.

The Cranberries reformed and the tour began in North America in mid-November, followed by South America in mid-January 2010 and Europe in March 2010. The band played songs from O'Riordan's solo albums, many of The Cranberries' classics, as well as new songs. In 2010, O'Riordan told Billboard magazine that playing with Fergal Lawler, Noel, and Mike Hogan worked better dynamically with her voice. By 2010, O'Riordan suffered from vocal cord nodules which caused her doctor to prescribe six weeks of rest from performing. Consequently, concert dates were cancelled and postponed, but the recurring problem persisted until 2012.

On 1 July 2011, a concert entitled "TU Warszawa"—"Here, Warsaw" was the main event of the inauguration of Poland's presidency of the EU council. O'Riordan performed "Zombie" and "I Lied" (English version of the Polish song "Skłamałam") with the Sinfonia Varsovia Orchestra, in Warsaw, Poland. At this point in her career, to keep up with her bookings, negotiations and finances, O'Riordan began to be managed by Danny Goldberg, former Kurt Cobain and Nirvana manager. Goldberg has also managed Sonic Youth and Courtney Love's band Hole. O'Riordan celebrated the reunion by touring with the Cranberries across Asia in July 2011, where the crowd was "impressed with her wide vocal range and strong vocal control". During the six years of their hiatus, O'Riordan and Noel Hogan occasionally shared ideas. In 2011, they recorded their sixth album, Roses with longtime producer Stephen Street, released in February 2012.

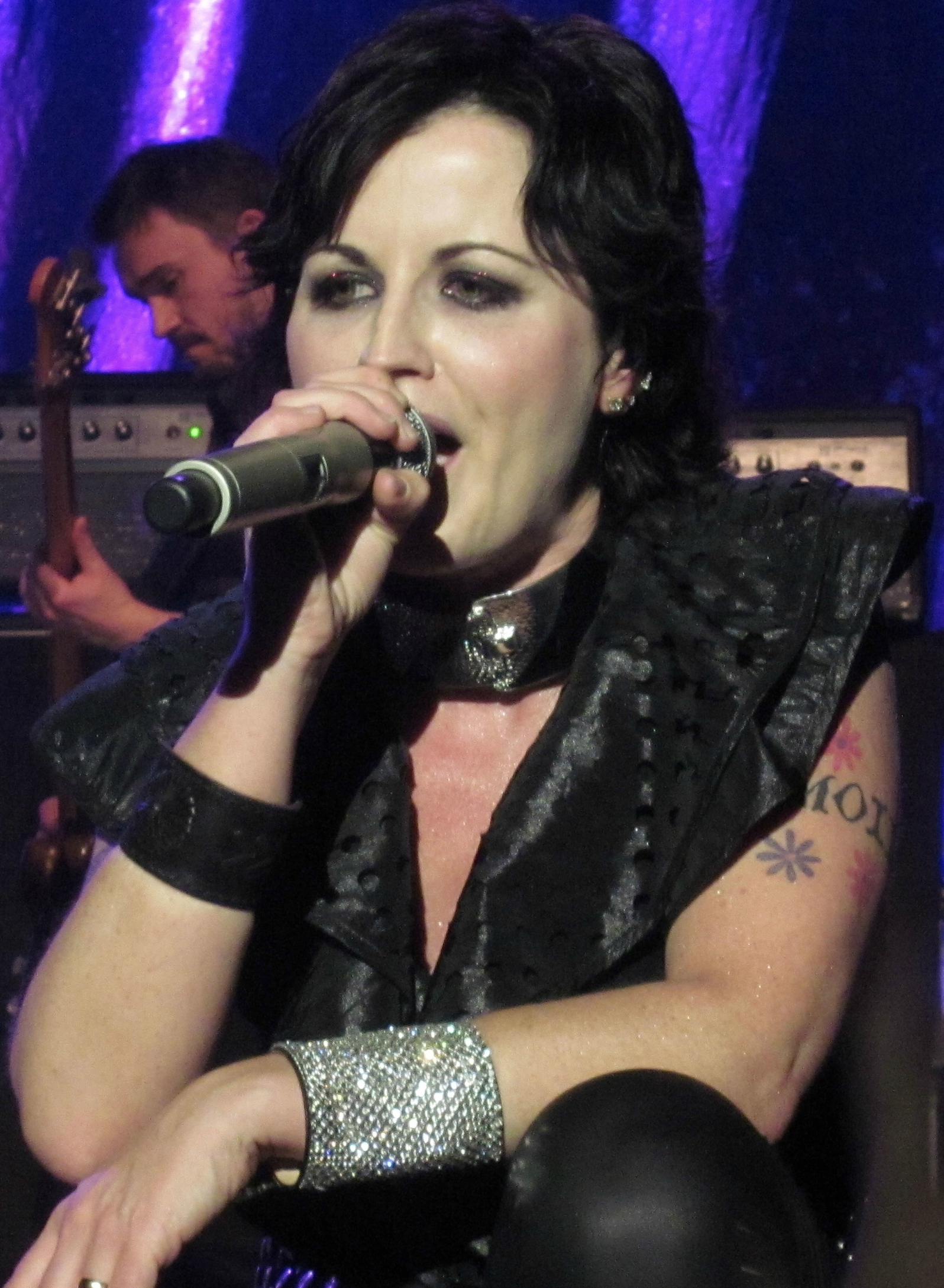
O'Riordan in May 2012

On 22 March 2012, the Cranberries cancelled nine minutes before the show at the Enmore Theatre in Sydney, O'Riordan suffered from food poisoning and was unable to perform. When she recovered, the Roses Tour resumed two days later and the cancelled show was rescheduled for 26 March. In May 2012, the final two concerts of the North American tour of the Cranberries had to be postponed for a then undisclosed reason, which was later said to involve from O'Riordan's "hectic touring schedule"; this caused some uncertainty about the upcoming European leg of the tour. For the second leg of the Roses World Tour, O'Riordan hired a touring backing vocalist, Johanna Cranitch. During anterior tours, backup vocals were performed by the band's backup guitarist, Steve DeMarchi. In November 2012, the extent to which her father's 2011 death was affecting O'Riordan was made public when she admitted in Le Télégramme that she was unable to perform "Ode to My Family" throughout the 32 shows of the second leg of the European tour; O'Riordan said "I hope to be able to sing it back one day, but for now, it's too soon".

=== 2013–2018: The Voice of Ireland and Something Else ===
O'Riordan replaced Sharon Corr as one of the mentors on RTÉ's The Voice of Ireland during the 2013–14 season. O'Riordan reached the final of the competition with her act Kellie Lewis, who finished in second place. In October 2013, O'Riordan and Marco Mendoza reconvened their partnership and were working on the songs for her announced third solo album scheduled for 2014, and presumably some film possibilities. Her final performance at the Vatican Christmas concert occurred in December 2013, where she performed "Letting Go" from Are You Listening?, "Silent Night" in duet with Elisa Toffoli, "Away in a Manger" and "Happy Xmas (War Is Over)". In the autumn of 2013, as her hometown of Limerick was preparing to start its tenure as Irish City of Culture in 2014, O'Riordan was approached by the city to play a special gig. During a New Year's Eve party under the Spire of St Mary's Cathedral, she performed with a quartet from the Irish Chamber Orchestra, playing "Linger", "Zombie" and one solo, "The Journey".

In mid-January 2014, between shoots for The Voice, O'Riordan stated that she had written 15 songs for a solo album and she planned to go to Los Angeles to elaborate the start of the album. In April 2014, disillusioned by her experiences in the music industry, O'Riordan told Barry Egan that the record business made her "extraordinarily wealthy, but sucked the blood out of her, like a particularly ferocious vampire". In mid-July 2014, O'Riordan had announced that she would not return to The Voice of Ireland for a second season due to her health condition affected by flights from Dublin to Canada during seven weeks of filming.

In April 2014, O'Riordan began recording new material with Jetlag, a collaboration with Andy Rourke of the Smiths and Olé Koretsky, a DJ and producer based in New York. They then formed a trio under the name D.A.R.K. Their first album, Science Agrees, was released in September 2016.

In late April 2017, celebrating the 25th anniversary of the band, the Cranberries released a new studio album Something Else, featuring acoustic versions of their greatest hits, and backed by the Irish Chamber Orchestra. Three new songs appear on this album: "Rupture," "Why" and "The Glory" the last song written by O'Riordan and Noel Hogan, in their song-writing partnership. The album was well received by critics; reviewers praised "the return of one of Ireland's finest songsmiths", and reacted favourably to the orchestral and acoustic reimagining. Music critic Karen Gwee described O'Riordan's voice as "more measured, more labile and rich with maturity", whilst saying that "the thinness of her voice dilutes the anxious energy of "Animal Instinct", one of the album's tracks".

In May 2017, the band started the world tour with acoustic concerts, with a string quartet. Most of the time, O'Riordan sang seated on a stool. After eleven shows, O'Riordan was said to be in "excruciating pain". The Cranberries published on social media the cancellation of the sold-out tour in Europe and North America, stating that O'Riordan's back problem was in the mid- to upper area of her spine and diaphragmatic movements associated with breathing and singing exacerbated the pain. During her rest, O'Riordan had been planning a new album of the Cranberries, and had written and recorded demo versions in her final years.

O'Riordan's last public performance was on 14 December 2017 in New York City, where she sang three Cranberries songs at Billboard's Christmas party. On 15 December 2017, Eminem released his album Revival which included a large sample from the song "Zombie" as the hook for his rap song "In Your Head".

== Artistry ==
=== Influences ===
O'Riordan's deeply religious mother had a strong influence on her musical development, introducing her to Elvis Presley at an early age. O'Riordan's Catholic education and experience playing the church organ also introduced her to classical church music genres such as Gregorian chant, which she described as having "great melodies." (Note: O'Riordan said in 2001 "One of the most amazing experiences of my life was to go into a monastery and see monks coming out at 6am and start chanting. I used to go to monasteries to get away from the whole world and all the crap that comes from teenage pressures".) Months before she died, O'Riordan tested the resonance and the acoustics of the Glenstal Abbey church in Ireland to sing there. O'Riordan stated that this apprenticeship by this detachment of the world in a raw and devoted setting influenced a lot of her development as an artist and as a musician.

She referred to Presley and John Lennon as particularly large influences during her early years. Other early influences include Frank Sinatra, Jim Reeves and Bing Crosby. In her teenage years, O'Riordan spent much of her time with her brothers who listened to heavy metal music, while being equally passionate about rock and Gaelic folk music.

When she had reached the age of 16, O'Riordan had started listening to the Smiths, the Cure, R.E.M., and Depeche Mode, which constituted her primary musical influences. She had also been influenced by the Kinks, Magazine, Siouxsie and the Banshees, and New Order.

She credited Johnny McEvoy's song "The Old Bog Road" as one of the most beautiful old Irish songs and praised the Pogues' songs. She made a reference to Ireland's most famous poet, William Butler Yeats. O'Riordan stated of the grunge decade; "creatively it was a really great time", mentioning Pearl Jam, Blind Melon and Nirvana. She wrote the song "I'm Still Remembering" six months after the death of Nirvana frontman Kurt Cobain. In 2009, talking about her three favourite albums, O'Riordan mentioned the Smiths' album The Smiths, Depeche Mode's album Violator, and the original soundtrack of the film The Mission. Her other musical influences include Morrissey, Led Zeppelin, also Metallica, and James Hetfield whom she met in 1995. She drew her influences from everyday life, events that occurred in the world, or her friendly and romantic relationships. Her yodeling signature came from listening to her father singing that way: she also cited female rock singers "like Sinéad O'Connor and Siouxsie Sioux". O'Riordan realized that "it was something that could work into The Cranberries' format because a lot of that was used in religious Irish music".

=== Songwriting and musicianship ===
Take any artistry and you'll find a melancholic strain in the works of the best pioneers, an undying obsession with death, and a primal need to capture the wondrous, the bizarre each time.

— Writer Sneha Bengani's reaction to O'Riordan's death

O'Riordan penned her first song, called "Calling", at the age of 12. She was the lead lyricist and co-composer of the band's songs with guitarist Noel Hogan, although she wrote a lot of the song structures. In the early days of the Cranberries, Hogan gave her a sequence of chords he had composed; a week later she came back with the completed lyrics of "Linger" (Note: A song she wrote about being rejected. O'Riordan said "some years later, after I was married, the guy Linger is about wrote me a long letter, saying: 'I know the song's about me. I never meant to hurt your feelings. Can we meet?' I thought: It's too late. You dumped me!".) and wrote "Sunday" shortly after. O'Riordan described in 1993 that she chose to be a singer and songwriter for the creative aspect, "something new", saying that she would not have been happy singing traditional Irish music for a living. O'Riordan had a preference for solitude as an approach to writing songs. According to Hogan, the Cranberries never changed their writing process after their first encounter. Throughout their partnership, O'Riordan and Hogan never sat in a room together and wrote at the same time.

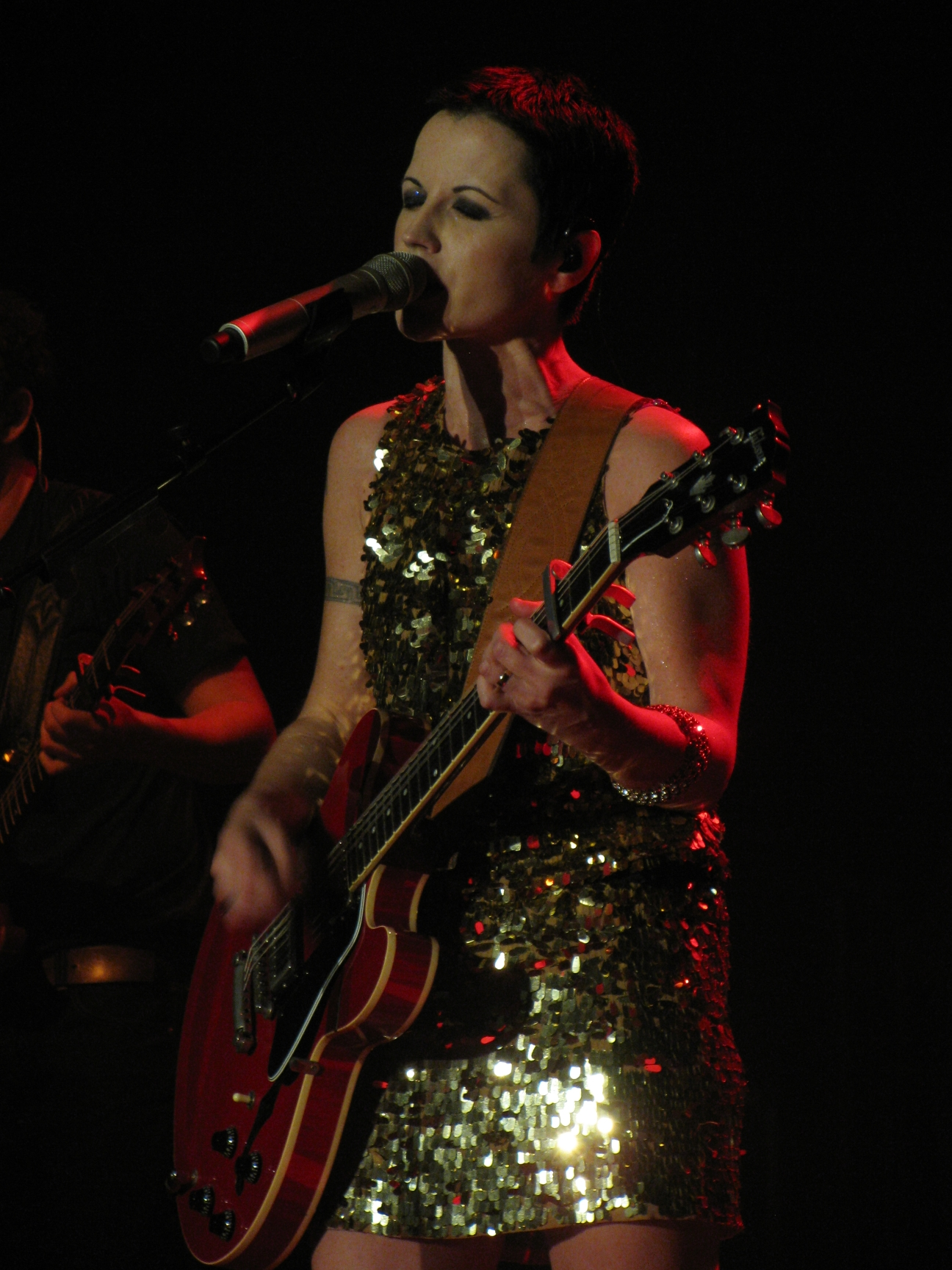
O'Riordan performing in Montreal in 2009

O'Riordan tended to write her ideas continuously through the day, although most of the melodies came in the night since she struggled with insomnia; and so, she had a history of sleeping pills dependence in the course of her career. She experienced writer's block for months during one period of her life.

I draw from a lot of different life experiences: births, deaths, war, pain, depression, anger, sadness. [ ... ] I found it very easy to write lyrics when I was younger because I had no inhibitions—they just came pouring out. I find as I get older it's more difficult: you develop fears and you go, 'What will people think of this?' But it's important not to think too much about what people will think, because then you'll never write!

— Dolores O'Riordan, speaking of song themes in How I Wrote...: Songwriting Magazine.

O'Riordan noted in Ultimate Guitar on her writing process, "lyrics are very important for me to make sure that I'm portraying whatever it is I need to portray. So I sit there but the funny thing is they've come to me anywhere". [ ... ] 'Oh, I have to go get a pen quick'. In the middle of the night when you're trying to go to sleep and they're going around in your head, your words, and you just get up and go out and write them down". O'Riordan was easily bored and could not rest for a week, Hogan described O'Riordan's routine working on her songs late at night or overnight: "her emails were like text messages. Fifteen of them, but they're all, like, two lines, at two o'clock in the morning." O'Riordan wrote songs about themes that evolved over the course of her career, her experience taught her to never feel inhibited and always make an effort to try other things artistically. O'Riordan stated in The Independent that she wrote about what is getting to her at the time, she said that writing lyrics was "about the things you need to talk about, I write to get my emotions out. It's self-therapeutic".

In the National Post, music producer Dan Brodbeck commented that on the first day at the studio after being hired, she played him a few chords and a piano medley, then left him alone with little guidance. O'Riordan came back a few hours later and accredited his work, then she took a microphone and started singing lyrics off the top of her head; Brodbeck stated: "it was always spur-of-the-moment, gut reaction stuff". Gil Moore, owner of Metalworks Studios, referred to O'Riordan as "a God-given talent". Moore later stated, "she was the quintessential signature style artist, a very free spirit. She was the antithesis of a formula writer. She just went her own way".

=== Voice ===
"Pathetic Senses"
O'Riordan displayed one of her vocal capabilities on the Cranberries' trademark sound. The song captures O'Riordan soaring up to Soprano High C (C 6).

O'Riordan was a mezzo-soprano, with a vocal range from B 2 to C 6. She did not sing much in the 5th octave but rather in a range of vocal comfort. She was familiar with the vocal belting of '90s alternative rock and was also devoted to her love of falsetto. Her voice was rather light without applying an uncomfortable weight, and she characteristically deployed a soft projection when she sang the lowest notes. O'Riordan's signature singing style integrated many elements, such as the lilting voice, mournful keening, glottal ornamentation and a distinctive attack on syllables. Mikael Wood of Los Angeles Times commented, "She had a high, airy tone that could turn ferocious without warning. She emphasized its breaks and curls, decorating the catchy melodies she wrote with florid vocal runs inherited from Celtic tradition." O'Riordan was also renowned for her yodeling techniques, embracing the sharp break of her voice. She had never compromised her strong Irish accent, even when she was criticized for that. Her singing was rooted in the Sean-nós vocal style; the University of Limerick wrote, "Dolores's voice carried strong traces of the Sean-nós (old style) Gaelic tradition of unaccompanied singing that so beautifully conveys sadness, regret and loneliness." "Íosa", an outtake from the Cranberries' debut album, was the only song in which O'Riordan sang entirely in Irish-Gaelic, inspired by her path as a liturgical soloist. Around the age of 40, the timbre of her voice changed and became more mature. (Note: O'Riordan smoked cigarettes excessively under the influence of alcohol. The extreme use of falsetto was also mentioned, although she managed to nuance with a "high, breathy voice".)

Melody Maker described O'Riordan's voice as "the voice of a saint trapped in a glass harp". In a Billboard article, Dan Weiss remarked that her voice was "at her best, one of the most impressive". Ireland's Prime Minister Leo Varadkar said O'Riordan was "the voice of a generation". Weiss praised O'Riordan's vocal ability, commenting: "She knew she could multiply her phrases in harmony and clever aural sculpting, which turned relatively simple and round chord progressions like "Ode to My Family" into complex waterfalls of vocalization, and yet the jangling folk guitars buffering them were clearly armored by capital-R rock".

=== Vocal recordings ===
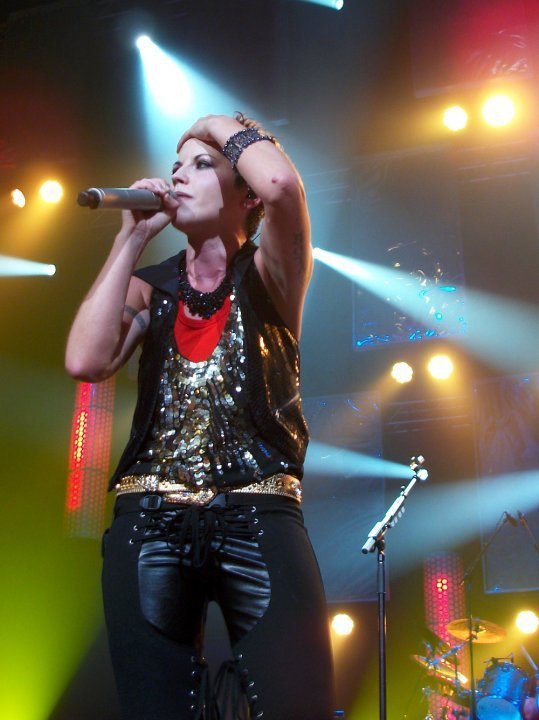
O'Riordan performing in 2010

Noel Hogan described how O'Riordan tended to "layer a lot of harmonies, a lot of falsetto stuff" as soon as she first entered the recording studio, Xeric Studios, at the beginning of 1990. O'Riordan used a Neumann U 87 microphone for her vocal tracks, especially during the recording of the debut studio album Everybody Else Is Doing It, So Why Can't We?. In an interview with Sound on Sound, in March 2019, Hogan and record producer Stephen Street said that "spontaneity was the key"; (Note: O'Riordan was especially shy in the earliest vocal sessions for the Cranberries' 1993 debut album and did not want to stay in the control room without her boyfriend. Stephen Street managed to win her confidence after four or five songs into the album—"the magic happens then", recalled Street.) Hogan said: "she would like to do maybe three or four takes". Regarding backing vocals she would go through very quickly, he said: "cause she had an amazing ear for tuning", then she ended with her highest notes. She would add additional layers of vocal inflections over the existing main vocals as she went along. In the South China Morning Post, Hogan described O'Riordan's voice during the recording of "Linger": We're all looking at each in the room going, 'where did that come out from?' because she was so small and tiny—you didn't expect that. And then she only grew from that point on. As the years went down, she just got better and better."

O'Riordan was recognized for her raw natural voice, Hogan corroborated this on Officialcharts, he stated: "we weren't going to start using Auto-Tune and all that shite. She would absolutely kill us", speaking of the production of the band's latest album, In the End, created from demo vocals recorded by O'Riordan before her death. O'Riordan tended to let her breathing be heard on the albums, preferring to focus on the delivery while emphasizing expressiveness and nuance rather than being perfectionist, saying "keep it natural, keep it real"—adding, "when it's too clean, when people go in and try to clean up the breath to make it sound seamless, it takes away from the reality". The voice recording protocol had evolved over the years, O'Riordan was worried about "oversinging and smothering the raw emotion in her delivery", as a result, she did not come to work in studios during daylight hours with Fergal Lawler and the two Hogan brothers. Lawler told David Browne in a 2019 Rolling Stone interview: "Dolores would come in to do the vocals and we'd have a chat. She'd have a listen to what we'd done and then we'd head off and let her do her thing. So in the evening time, you're almost looking out in the corridor to see if she's coming in."

== Personal life ==
On 18 July 1994, O'Riordan married Canadian-born Don Burton, who was the former tour manager of Duran Duran. They met in the U.S. while Duran Duran and the Cranberries were on tour together. The wedding was held at Holy Cross Abbey in County Tipperary. The couple had three children. O'Riordan had a stepson from Burton's previous relationship. In 1996, they lived at The Coach House, a medieval-style residence beside Ballyhannon Castle at Quin in County Clare, Ireland. They lived in their first home for a year while they planned their own ultra-modern house, including a recording studio and guest apartment, set on a 16-acre (6.5-hectare) plot in Dunquin, west County Kerry, on the Dingle Peninsula, but they spent little time there and later sold the property.

In 1998, the couple bought a 150-acre (61-hectare) stud farm, called Riversfield Stud, located in Kilmallock, County Limerick, before selling it for US$5 million in 2004. They then moved to Howth, County Dublin, where O'Riordan acquired a house in 2004; she later sold the house in 2010. The family spent summers in a log cabin on a property they bought in 1994 near Buckhorn, Ontario, Canada.

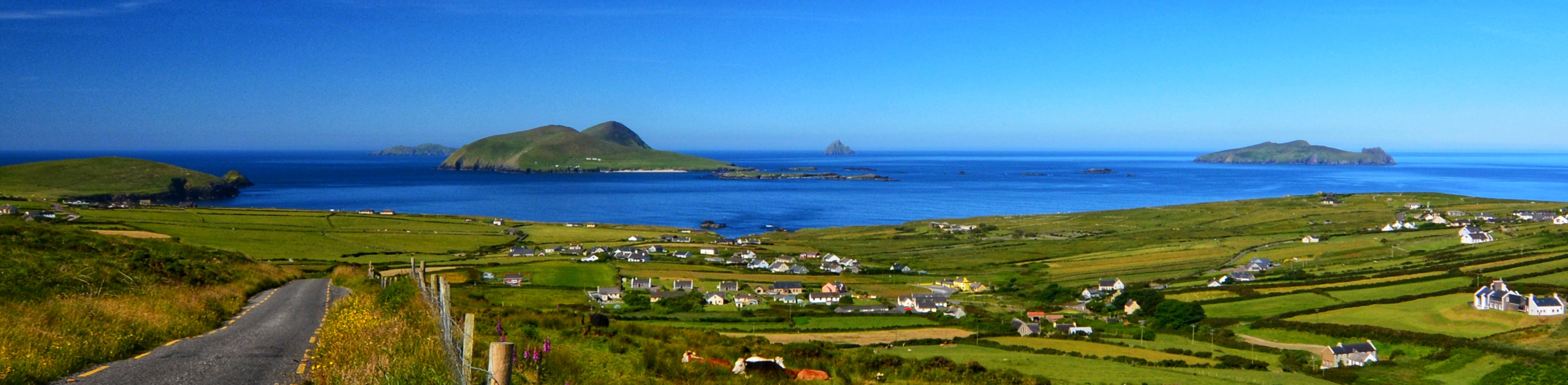
Former mansion of O'Riordan and Don Burton, large house to the far right, on the tip of the Dingle Peninsula in Ireland. The mansion dominated a hillside in Dún Chaoin and was nicknamed "Dolly's Folly" by some locals due to its construction of massive proportions into the landscape.

Raised as a Roman Catholic, O'Riordan was an admirer of Pope John Paul II, whom she met in 2001 and 2002. She was also interested in hurling and played the sport as a child. In 2018, Limerick bridged a 45-year gap to win the 2018 All-Ireland SHC, and "Dreams" by The Cranberries was played at Croke Park to coincide with the festivities. The team later brought the trophy to her family home.

In 2009, O'Riordan and her family moved full-time to Buckhorn, Ontario, living in a waterfront home on Big Bald Lake.

In October 2009, O'Riordan attended an event at The Westwood Theatre in Ontario, after a screening of South Dakota: A Woman's Right to Choose, a film about teenage pregnancy and abortion. O'Riordan moderated a discussion with high school pupils; she remained neutral and allowed the girls to formulate their own opinions.

On 25 November 2011, O'Riordan's father died at his home in Limerick after six years of fighting cancer. According to O'Riordan, he held on to celebrate his 50th wedding anniversary on 14 November.

In July 2013, O'Riordan and her family moved to the exclusive area of Abington, in the north of Dublin, and they eventually developed the idea of buying a house.

In October 2013, O'Riordan told journalist and close friend Barry Egan in the Sunday Independent's Life magazine that she had attempted suicide by overdosing on medication, but "wanted to live for her kids". O'Riordan also spoke publicly of her painful personal history. O'Riordan was sexually abused by a family friend for four years from the ages of 8 to 12. She developed depression, deep self-loathing and suicidal thoughts over the years which were worsened by her accelerating career and led to anorexia. Afterward, she said that she continued to move forward for her children and her husband. At her father's funeral in 2011, O'Riordan's abuser introduced himself to her and apologized for his actions. O'Riordan said in 2013 "I had nightmares for a year before my father's death about meeting him. ... I didn't see him for years and years and then I saw him at my father's funeral. I had blocked him out of my life".

O'Riordan's family moved back to Canada in November 2013, considering they were used to the outdoors and the wilderness. Towards the end of 2013, O'Riordan returned to live in Ireland; this decision preceded the end of her marriage.

O'Riordan and her husband Burton ended their marriage in September 2014 after 20 years together. Following her split from Burton, O'Riordan suffered from serious depression in 2014 and her mental health issues were compounded by alcohol use. O'Riordan left Canada and moved to New York City, living first in a hotel in Union Square and then at Trump Tower.

On 10 November 2014, O'Riordan was arrested and charged in connection with air rage on an Aer Lingus flight from JFK International Airport to Shannon Airport. During the flight, she became verbally and physically abusive to the crew. When police were arresting her, she resisted, reminding them that her taxes paid their wages and shouting, "I'm the Queen of Limerick! I'm an icon!", headbutting one Garda officer and spitting at another. She allegedly fractured the air hostess's foot during the incident and was medically assessed at University Hospital, escorted by Shannon Police. Following her arrest, O'Riordan spent three weeks in a psychiatric hospital. She later pleaded guilty to the charges. Eileen O'Riordan stated that her daughter was in a fragile mental state and that medical results indicated there was no alcohol or drugs detected in her daughter's system. The judge hearing her case agreed to dismiss all charges if she apologized in writing to her victims and contributed €6,000 ($7,300) to the court poor box. Later, O'Riordan told the media that she had been stressed from living in New York hotels following the end of her 20-year marriage. Her family described Dolores as "strong-minded and determined"; however, discussing her mental instability and her volatile vulnerability in a 2014 interview with the Belfast Telegraph, O'Riordan explained that she "carried quite a burden of pain and torment from (her) past".

In January 2015, O'Riordan returned to the U.S., where she bought an apartment in the East Village of New York. Also in 2015, O'Riordan developed a relationship with the U.S. musician Olé Koretsky, with whom she shared the last years of her life. In 2017, O'Riordan bought a new house near her hometown of Limerick.

In May 2017, O'Riordan publicly discussed her bipolar disorder, stating that she had been diagnosed in 2015. According to one writer, music was more a therapy than a commodity for O'Riordan. O'Riordan admitted that "there have been times when I've struggled. The death of my father and mother-in-law was very hard. Looking back, I think depression, whatever the cause, is one of the worst things to go through. Then again, I've also had a lot of joy in my life, especially with my children. You get ups as well as downs. Sure, isn't that what life's all about?"

O'Riordan started writing a suicide note in September 2017 during a period of taking lorazepam and drinking. An American psychotherapist assessed O'Riordan on 26 December 2017, suggesting an abstinence from alcohol and noting no suicidal thoughts.

O'Riordan's final social media post, looking to the future, occurred on 4 January 2018.

=== Wealth ===
In 2006, she was one of the 10 richest women in Ireland, and was reported to be the fifth-richest woman in 1999. In 2008, she was sixth on the list of the ten richest artists in Ireland; her net worth was $66 million.

== Death ==
On 15 January 2018, O'Riordan was found unresponsive in the bathroom of a London hotel room and pronounced dead at 9:16 a.m. She was 46. An inquest at Westminster Coroner's Court held on 6 September, ruled that she died as a result of accidental drowning in a bath following sedation by alcohol intoxication. Empty bottles were found in O'Riordan's room (five miniature bottles and a champagne bottle) as well as some prescription drugs. Toxicology tests showed that her body contained only "therapeutic" levels of these medications but had a blood alcohol content of 330 mg/dL (0.33%).

O'Riordan was living in New York City at the time of her death. She had travelled to London to work with Martin "Youth" Glover on her side-project D.A.R.K. and to meet representatives of the BMG record label about a new Cranberries album. O'Riordan arrived at the Hilton Hotel on Park Lane, Mayfair, on 14 January. At 2 a.m. on the morning of her death, O'Riordan had a phone call with her mother.

The day after O'Riordan's death, the tabloid newspaper Santa Monica Observer spread a false story stating that fentanyl had been found in her room and that London authorities suspected that she had committed suicide. The fentanyl overdose rumour endured for months.

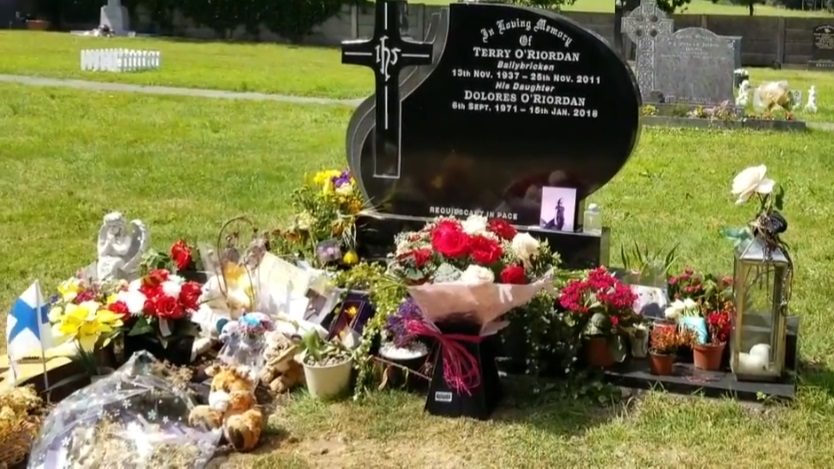
O'Riordan's grave (pictured in 2018)

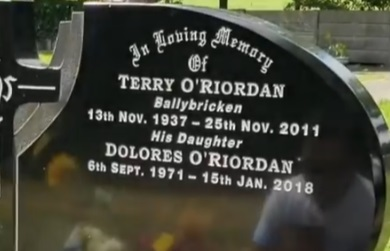
O'Riordan's and her father's tombstone at Caherelly Cemetery in Herbertstown

=== Memorial service ===
A three-day funeral in her hometown, with O'Riordan lying in repose, lasted from 20 to 22 January at St Joseph's Church. In a tribute normally reserved for heads of state, thousands streamed past her open coffin in a four-hour public reposing inside the church. O'Riordan, wearing dark eyeshadow, with raven hair, was laid out wearing black and holding a set of pearl rosary beads. O'Riordan's music was played, while photographs of the singer performing one of her songs and posing with Pope John Paul II were placed along the walls. Friends left a floral tribute next to the coffin, which read: "The song has ended, but the memories linger on". Young and old travelled from all over the world—including from Spain, China and South America—to pay their respects in person.

O'Riordan was buried on 23 January after a service at Saint Ailbe's Roman Catholic Church, Ballybricken, County Limerick; it began with the studio recording of "Ave Maria" as sung by O'Riordan and Luciano Pavarotti. At the end of the service, the Cranberries' song "When You're Gone" was played. Among the attendees at her funeral were her mother, Eileen; her three children and their father, O'Riordan's former husband, Don Burton; her sister and brothers; all Cranberries members; O'Riordan's boyfriend, Olé Koretsky; Ireland's president, Michael D. Higgins; former rugby union player Ronan O'Gara; and Bono's wife, Ali Hewson. O'Riordan was buried alongside her father.

=== Remembrances ===
==== Recognition ====
The President of Ireland at the time, Michael D. Higgins, was one of the first to pay his respects. The Taoiseach of Ireland, Leo Varadkar, also paid his respects to O'Riordan. Also, in recognition of O'Riordan's influence, the Avett Brothers covered the Cranberries song "Linger". Bono and Johnny Depp performed a tribute for O'Riordan ending the performance on "Linger", at the National Concert Hall in Dublin, Ireland, just hours after the sudden death of O'Riordan. Bono, Sinéad O'Connor, Johnny Depp and Nick Cave gave Dolores O'Riordan a standing ovation at a birthday party for Shane MacGowan, singer of the Pogues. On the announcement of her death on 15 January 2018, O'Riordan appeared on the huge 360° screen overhanging the Madison Square Garden floor in New York City during a New York Rangers game. A photo of this appearance was published on 17 January 2018 on Madison Square Garden's Facebook.

Among those honouring O'Riordan were the Cranberries, Olé Koretsky, Andy Rourke (former bassist of the Smiths), Stephen Street, U2, Duran Duran, Julian Lennon, Liz Phair, James Corden, Josh Groban, Roger Bennett, Hozier, Foster the People, Elijah Wood, Peter Cornell (brother of Chris Cornell, who died May of the previous year), Mark Lanegan, Pearl Jam, Bryan Adams, Halsey, Kodaline, the The, Michael Stipe and R.E.M., Dave Davies of the Kinks, Adele, Garbage, Annie Lennox, Cerys Matthews, Lisa Stansfield, Michelle Branch, Dan Brodbeck, Slash, Graham Hopkins, Benjamin Kowalewicz, Vic Fuentes, actors Luke Evans and Francois Arnaud, Questlove, Kiesza, Diplo, Gao Xiaosong, Colin Parry, The Tim Parry Johnathan Ball Foundation for Peace, Ali Hewson, Adi Roche and Chernobyl Children International. On 29 March 2018, Mayor Stephen Keary presented the book of condolences with over 16,000 signatures to O'Riordan's mother Eileen, brothers Donal, Terry and Joe, and other family members.

==== Further reaction ====
The Kinks guitarist Dave Davies, a close friend of O'Riordan, had planned to collaborate on songs together before she died; they had an idea for a song called "Home"—"about being home again".

Just prior to her death on 15 January 2018, while she was in London for a studio mixing session with Youth on D.A.R.K.'s second album, O'Riordan left a voice message—the last one she would ever leave—at 1:12 a.m. to her longtime friend, Dan Waite, who coordinated a recording session of a "Zombie" cover that he had previously given O'Riordan to listen to and accredit. According to Waite, she offered "to sing on it" on Christmas Eve 2017. TMZ published this voice message on 5 April 2018. On 18 January 2018, the heavy metal band Bad Wolves released this cover of "Zombie", which charted on multiple Billboard charts.

On 28 January 2018, the In Memoriam segment of the 60th Annual Grammy Awards honored a number of music icons, including O'Riordan.

"Dreams" was played in Croke Park to the 82,000-capacity crowd on 19 August 2018, after Limerick GAA won the Liam MacCarthy Cup in the All-Ireland Senior Hurling Championship for the first time in 45 years. The cup was later toured around Limerick and was brought by the team to O'Riordan's family home in Ballybricken.

On 24 April 2019, Saint Sister, a duo from Northern Ireland, performed an a cappella rendition of "Dreams" at the funeral in St Anne's Cathedral in Belfast of Lyra McKee; McKee, some allege, was killed by the New IRA on 18 April 2019.

=== Aftermath ===
In mid-September 2018, bandmate Noel Hogan confirmed that the Cranberries would disband after releasing their final album, In the End. He said: "We don't want to continue without Dolores, so we're just going to leave after this".

On 6 September 2023 (which would have been O'Riordan's 52nd birthday), the upcoming release of an album of solo songs that O'Riordan had recorded a few years before her death was announced.

=== Posthumous sales ===
The Cranberries dominated Amazon's music digital sales in the 24 hours following O'Riordan's death announcement, with sales surging on the site by 913,350% of their album Something Else. O'Riordan's solo work Are You Listening? was ranked second. The Cranberries' albums also dominated Amazon's ranking of physical CD and vinyl sales, along with her solo album, No Baggage, seeing an increase in sales of 200,000%. Four albums of the Cranberries reached the iTunes Top 10 Albums chart, with Stars: The Best of 1992–2002 peaking at No. 2. The band's biggest hits, including "Linger", "Dreams" and "Zombie", ranked in the top five most-downloaded digital songs on Amazon's list, and ranked in the top 10 of the iTunes songs chart.

== Legacy ==
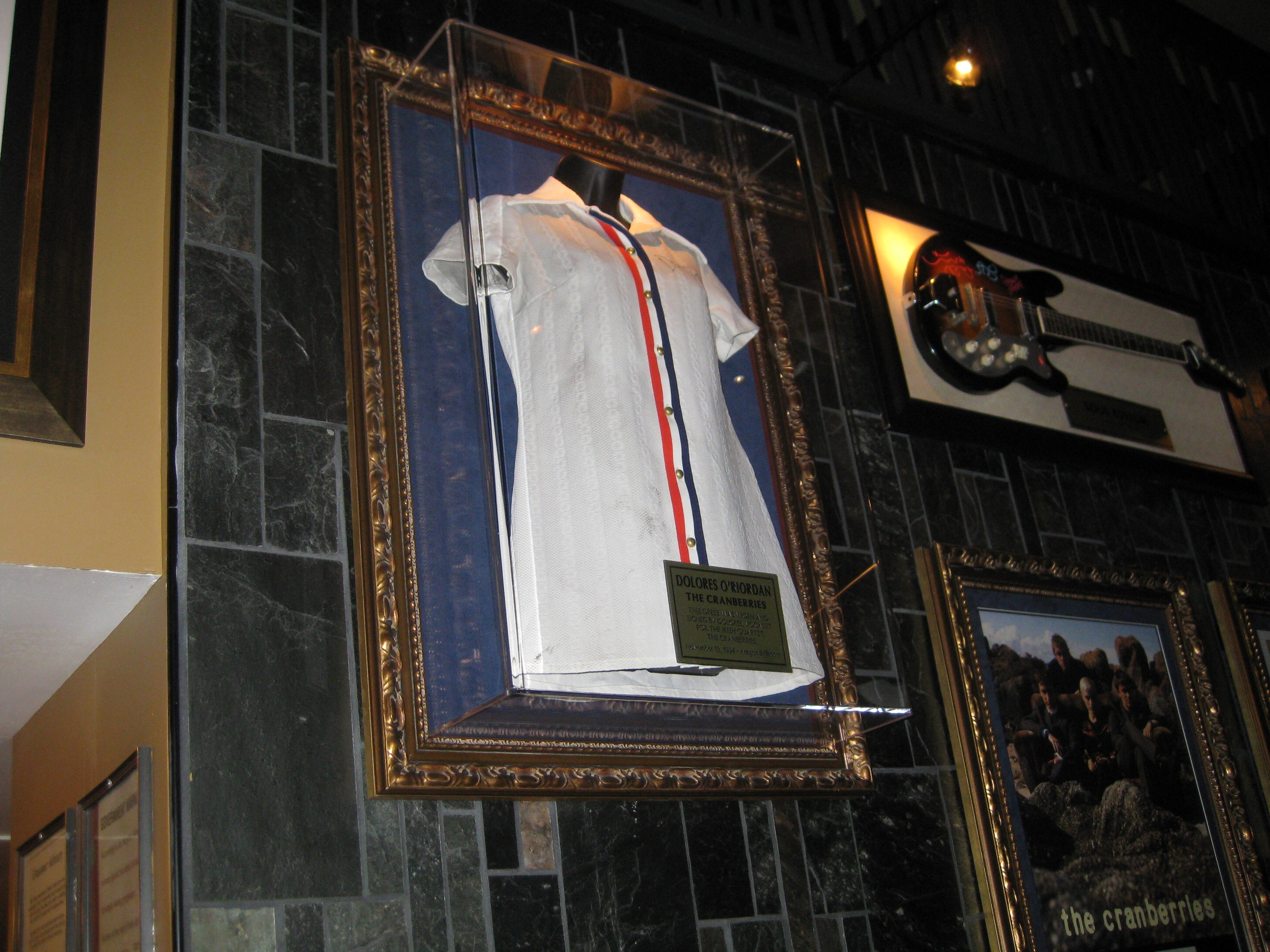
O'Riordan's No Need to Argue–era outfit displayed at the Hard Rock Cafe, Chicago

O'Riordan has been referred to as "one of the most distinctive voices in alternative rock history". Through her impact on the music industry, she has been described as "one of the most recognisable voices in pop culture". O'Riordan also brought an "inimitable" and "unique voice" to the 1990s' music scene and to rock music. She is considered an "icon of Irish pop" and a "1990s rock icon".

Recording Academy contributor Philip Merrill called O'Riordan "a gifted songwriter and vocalist whose ballads helped define alt-pop in the 1990s". She was credited for her innovative style embodied by her "measured vocal power, her honest, vulnerable songwriting", reinforced by her Irish accent, thus helping the Cranberries to rise "into worldwide stardom". Music industry publication Billboard considered the song "Linger" as "pure Irish poetry", while "Dreams", which contains no chorus, is regarded as "one of the greatest songs of all time". Amanda Petrusich wrote how she deviated from the norm, saying that most of the other rock singers at the time sounded "plainly and hopelessly cool—disaffected, vaguely antagonistic and aloof", while "O'Riordan sounded like a maniac". Following news of O'Riordan's death, U2 described O'Riordan's music, and vocal style with these words: "out of the West came this storm of a voice—she had such strength of conviction, yet she could speak to the fragility in all of us". Hozier and Foster the People called O'Riordan "a true pioneer" for future generations.

According to Hot Press' Stuart Clark, who wrote the press release for the Cranberries' first cassette EP, O'Riordan was an artist who "left an indelible mark". He also referred to her as an Irish female icon. TV producer Larry Bass regarded her as "not only an icon but an Irish female icon. Very few Irish women had achieved the heights that she had on a global stage". For contemporary Ireland's singers, O'Riordan is considered a "beacon for future generations of singers", stated Hot Press editorial writer Peter McGoran. Irish President Michael D Higgins praised O'Riordan's and the band's "immense influence on rock and pop music in Ireland and internationally".

A place of pilgrimage, the grave of O'Riordan continues to attract devotees from around the world. O'Riordan's commitment to her roots, which was consolidated by her authenticity, attracted fascination. According to Una Mullally of The New York Times, O'Riordan's native accent positioned the Cranberries as a "truly" Irish band, which maintained its cultural identity and integrity, whose "global success was instigated by how America embraced them", by their music videos in "heavy rotation", and "crucially, by American radio". Rolling Stone stated that in 1995 the Cranberries were "Ireland's biggest musical export since U2". Paul Sexton of Billboard and the Australian Broadcasting Corporation have acknowledged O'Riordan and the Cranberries' influence on people, citing them as "one of the biggest-selling rock bands of the '90s". Ethnomusicologist Dr. Aileen Dillane commented that "countless other writers and Twitter commentators reminisced upon how the band seemed to encapsulate the '90s zeitgeist and on the profound impact they and Dolores as lead singer had on their lives and sense of who (and where) they were in the world at that time". In 2018, Hannah Tindle of Another Magazine wrote that "her strength of character shone through in the songs she wrote that remain, to this day, some of the most seminal in music history".

In January 2018, the Dallas Observer listed O'Riordan alongside David Bowie, Prince and Tom Petty as iconic musicians who died between 2016 and 2018. In 2018, the South Coast Herald stated that "Dolores O'Riordan and the Cranberries inspired millions". O'Riordan inspired contemporary artists around the world while having a lasting impact on various musical styles; following news of her death, Maggie Rogers said, "Dolores O'Riordan's voice helped me understand my place in the world." AsiaOne argued that the Cranberries—especially O'Riordan's voice and singing style—have influenced many Chinese musicians and have had an unprecedented lasting impact on popular music across Asia. The BBC added that O'Riordan was a major musical influence to Faye Wong, one of China's biggest pop stars. Others influenced by O'Riordan include Florence Welch, Adele, Halsey, Heather Baron-Gracie, Michelle Branch and Avril Lavigne.

O'Riordan was regarded as a humanitarian activist advocating for children throughout the world; most of the songs of O'Riordan communicated her empathy with human suffering and reflected popular hope for peace. The Tim Parry Johnathan Ball Foundation for Peace stated that O'Riordan "left a legacy through her music that speaks for so many of us and called on all of us to follow a path of peace".

On 19 February 2018, RTÉ One broadcast a 40-minute documentary about O'Riordan entitled Dolores. The documentary was produced by Dave Fanning and included never-before-seen interviews.

== Accolades ==
=== Awards and nominations ===
Award	Year	Nominee(s)	Category	Result	Ref.
Žebřík Music Awards	1994	Herself	Best International Female	Nominated	
Žebřík Music Awards	1996	Herself	Best International Female	Nominated	
Žebřík Music Awards	1999	Herself	Best International Female	Nominated	
Žebřík Music Awards	2000	Herself	Best International Female	Nominated	

- 1995: She received an MTV Europe Music Award. "Zombie" was awarded Best Song and bested Michael Jackson's "You Are Not Alone".
- 1995: She received a World Music Award.
- 1995: She was nominated for International Group at the Brit Awards.
- 1996: She received a Juno Award.
- 1997: She was nominated for a Juno Award.
- 1997: She received the Ivor Novello Award for International Achievement, at London's Grosvenor House.
- 2008: She received a European Border Breakers Award.
- 2016: She received a BMI Awards and a Special Citation of Achievement.
- 2018: She was named the Top Female Artist of All Time in Billboard's Alternative Songs chart, encompassing soloists, group frontwomen and women in duos. On the 30th anniversary of the music chart, O'Riordan was named at the top of the 30-name list.
- 2020: She was nominated for a posthumous 2020 Grammy Awards. The Cranberries' In the End received a Grammy nomination for Best Rock Album.

Honours

- 2009: She received the University Philosophical Society's honorary patronage of Trinity College Dublin.
- 2019: She received an honorary Doctorate from the University of Limerick. The posthumous Honorary Doctorate of Letters was presented to Dolores's mother Eileen O'Riordan. Noel Hogan, Mike Hogan and Fergal Lawler were also honoured at the ceremony.

== Solo discography ==
=== Albums ===
Title	Album details	Peak chart positions									Sales
Title	Album details	IRE	AUS	BEL	FRA	GER	ITA	SWI	UK	US	Sales
Are You Listening?	Released: 4 May 2007; Label: Sanctuary; Formats: CD, digital download	15	58	38	11	39	2	10	28	77	Europe: 600,000
No Baggage	Released: 21 August 2009; Label: Cooking Vinyl, Rounder; Formats: CD, digital download	80	—	75	30	77	6	25	—	—	Europe: 30,000
"—" denotes items that did not chart or were not released in that territory.

=== Singles ===
Year	Title	Peak chart positions		Album
Year	Title	IRE	ITA	Album
2004	"Pure Love" (with Zucchero)	—	—	Zu & Co.
2007	"Ordinary Day"	50	2	Are You Listening?
2007	"When We Were Young"	—	—	Are You Listening?
2009	"The Journey"	—	—	No Baggage
2009	"Switch Off the Moment"	—	—	No Baggage
"—" denotes items that did not chart or were not released in that territory.

=== Other appearances ===
Title	Year	Other artist(s)	Comment
"Soon Is Never Soon Enough"	1992	Moose	Backing vocals
"Carousel"	1993	Touch of Oliver	Backing vocals
"The Sun Does Rise"	1994	Jah Wobble	Duet
"Pure Love"	2004	Zucchero	Duet
"Mirror Lover"	2005	Jam & Spoon	Vocals
"The Butterfly"	2006	Angelo Badalementi	Vocals
"Senza Fiato"	2007	Giuliano Sangiorgi	Duet

=== Other contributions ===
Title	Year	Album	Comment
"God Be with You"	1997	The Devil's Own	
"It's Only Rock 'n' Roll"	1999	Single	With supergroup Artists for Children's Promise
"Ave Maria"	2004	The Passion of the Christ: Songs Inspired By	Solo track
"Angels Go to Heaven"	2004	Evilenko	Vocals; film soundtrack
"The Woodstrip/There's No Way Out"	2004	Evilenko	Vocals; film soundtrack
"Linger"	2006	Click	Film soundtrack
"Centipede Sisters"	2008	Roll Play 2	Television soundtrack
"Cryopian D"	2015	Like a Puppet Show	Vocals and mixed; vinyl-only release
"Angela's Song"	2017	Angela's Christmas (Netflix)	Netflix Film Music Performer

=== Music videos ===
Year	Title	Album
1994	"The Sun Does Rise" (with Jah Wobble)	Take Me to God (Jah Wobble's album)
2007	"Ordinary Day"	Are You Listening?
2007	"When We Were Young"	Are You Listening?
2009	"The Journey"	No Baggage

== Filmography ==
Title	Year	Role	Notes
Saturday Night Live!	1995	Herself (musical guest)	Episode: "George Clooney / The Cranberries"
Charmed	1999	Herself	Episode: "She's a Man, Baby, a Man!"
Click	2006	Herself (cameo)	performs "Linger" during Ben's wedding
