= The Gandharvas =

Canadian alternative rock band

- Also known as: The Droogs; The London Droogs
- Origin: London, Ontario, Canada
- Genres: Alternative rock
- Years active: 1989–2000
- Labels: Watch Music; MCA; Avex DD
- Members: Paul Jago; Jud Ruhl; Brian Ward; Beau Cook; Tim McDonald
- Past members: Rob Blanchette; Eric Howden

The Gandharvas was a Canadian alternative rock band formed in 1989 in London, Ontario.

== History ==
The band formed in 1989 as The Droogs (later The London Droogs), and released a self-titled EP in 1991. They changed their name to The Gandharvas in 1993, after Gandharvas, who are musical spirits in Hinduism.

The band performed live shows in the London area, and in November 1993 signed with the label Watch Music. In 1994, the group released their debut album as The Gandharvas, titled A Soap Bubble and Inertia. The album included the single "The First Day of Spring", which was named Song of the Year (CASBY Award) by The Edge 102.1 in Toronto, and was nominated for MuchMusic's Video of the Year. A Soap Bubble and Inertia entered the Canadian album charts at No. 51 in July 1994 and peaked at No. 39 on August 1, 1994.

In 1995, they released their second album Kicking in the Water, and shortly after were signed by major label MCA Records. Their 1997 release, Sold for a Smile, included the singles "Downtime" and "Watching the Girl". All three albums were also released in Japan on the label Avex DD.

Though Sold for a Smile was a minor commercial success (with the "Downtime" video receiving substantial play at MuchMusic), the album would be the band's last, as the grunge/alternative movement of the 1990s faded in popularity. They would announce their breakup in 2000.

Following the break-up of the band, Beau Cook returned to his former band, Smoother. Vocalist Paul Jago became a geologist and moved to Arizona, later forming the band (duo with wife) SAID DOG.

== Band members ==
Final line-up

- Paul Jago – vocals (1989–2000)
- Jud Ruhl – guitar (1989–2000)
- Brian Ward – guitar (1989–2000)
- Beau Cook – bass, keyboards (1996–2000)
- Tim McDonald – drums (1989–2000)

== Former members ==
- Rob Blanchette – bass (1989–1993)
- Eric Howden – bass (1993–1996)

== Discography ==
=== The Droogs ===
- The Droogs – 1991

=== Gandharvas ===
- A Soap Bubble and Inertia (1994) #39 RPM Canada
- Kicking in the Water (1995)
- Sold for a Smile (1997)
