= Headstrong (Headstrong album) =

Studio album by Headstrong
- Released: February 19, 2002
- Recorded: 2001
- Studios: London, Ontario (Recorded), Los Angeles, California (Mixed)
- Genres: Rap rock; nu metal; rap metal
- Length: 42:11
- Label: RCA
- Producer: Dan Brodbeck

Headstrong chronology
Demo (2001)	Headstrong (2002)

Singles from Headstrong
- 1. "Adriana" Released: 2002

Headstrong is the only album by Headstrong. It was released on RCA Records in 2002 and proved to be the group's only album before disbanding the following year.

The band chose Dan Brodbeck, the same man behind their demo, to produce the album in their hometown of London, Ontario, Canada. Headstrong features one single in "Adriana", which reached #15 on the Mainstream Rock Tracks and had a music video. Its style features elements of hip hop and funk intertwined with metal and has been compared to bands like Rage Against the Machine, 311, and Red Hot Chili Peppers.

Prior to the release of Headstrong, the band toured through Canada from November to December 2001. Following its release, they performed with Tommy Lee before being pulled from touring in July 2002. The following month they were dropped by RCA Records.

Despite that all of the members and producers were Canadian by origin, Headstrong was priced at $24.99 in local Canadian markets, making it difficult for the band to earn fans in their debut in their own territory. The band cites these types of decisions in their reasons to exit the music business.

== Reception ==
Professional ratings
Review scores
Source	Rating
AllMusic	2/5 stars
CANOE	(favorable)
Music Reviewer	(favorable)

Headstrong received mixed reviews. Brian O'Neill of AllMusic described it as "a decidedly Caucasian rap-rock mélange that sounds like it's been heard before, but only because it has." However, Robin Steeley of Music Reviewer gave the album 6/10, noting that it "features dynamic production and skilled instrumentation." CANOE's Mike Ross also showed a mixed but overall positive reaction:

For all the cryptic complaining from a singer who sounds like the guy from Soul Coughing when he raps and like every other wigga in the 'hood when he shouts, this is a powerful rap-metal offering that puts shame to all that came before it - or at least adds maturity to a particularly obnoxious and posturing musical genre ... With inventive production and instrumentation throughout, Headstrong is intelligent rap-metal, if such a thing is possible.

== Track listing ==
No.	Title	Length
1.	"All of the Above"	4:01
2.	"Backlash"	3:37
3.	"Inside Joke"	3:14
4.	"Swing Harder (Temper Temper)"	4:09
5.	"Build" (instrumental)	0:38
6.	"Adriana"	3:31
7.	"Do What You Feel Like"	2:53
8.	"I Am for Real"	4:20
9.	"Get In"	3:15
10.	"Hoodies & Hood"	4:01
11.	"State"	3:41
12.	"Open Season"	4:51
Total length:		42:11

== Personnel ==
- Matt Kinna – vocals
- Jon Cohen – bass guitar
- Joel Krass – guitar
- Brian Matthews – drums
- Dan Brodbeck – producer
- Jack Joseph Puig – mixing

== Charts ==
Year	Song	Chart	Position
2002	Adriana	Mainstream Rock Tracks	15
