= Dan Brodbeck =

Canadian record producer, recording engineer/mixer and professor

Dan Brodbeck is a Canadian record producer, recording engineer/mixer and recording engineering professor based in London, Ontario.

== Production and engineering career ==
Throughout the 1990s Brodbeck owned dB Recording Studios in London, Ontario. During that time he worked with various artists including The Gandharvas, Brian Vollmer and Garnet Rogers. In 2000, he became a partner at EMAC Recording Studios where he worked with artists such as Headstrong, Helix, Gord Prior, The Salads, Clockwise, Ana Lovelis, Landon Pigg. In 2003, he worked on the debut solo album Are You Listening by Dolores O'Riordan of The Cranberries. He produced the self-titled debut album of Raven Quinn and Ivory Hours's Morning Light in 2015. He also co-produced Preservation America by Industry. In 2017 he co-produced, engineered and mixed Ivory Hours' Dreamworld as well as Texas King's Circles. He has had contributions to three Cranberries albums (Roses, Something Else and In The End) as a musician and recording engineer.

== Educational career ==
Brodbeck went to high school at London South Collegiate Institute. In 2007 and 2008 Brodbeck taught music production at Fanshawe College in the Music Industry Arts program. In 2010, he returned to the Music Industry Arts program as a full-time professor of recording engineering and is now the Program Coordinator of the Fanshawe Music Industry Arts program as well as the Audio Post Production Program

== Awards ==
In 2010, he won a Juno Award for Recording Engineer of the Year for his work on the songs "Apple of My Eye" and "Be Careful" from Dolores O'Riordan's album No Baggage. In 2017 he was nominated for Record Producer of The Year at the Country Music Association of Ontario Awards for his work on Dani Strong's "Time To Breathe". The Cranberries final album, In The End, was nominated for Rock Album of The Year at the 2020 Grammy Awards. Dan engineered, played guitar and keyboards, and wrote on that record.

== Produced, engineered or mixed groups or artists ==
- Landon Pigg LP
- Jersey Generation Genocide
- The Salads

Dolores O'Riordan The Cranberries Ivory Hours Texas King Headstrong Landon Pigg Clockwise
