= The Salads =

Punk rock band from Newmarket, Ontario, Canada

- The Salads

Background information
- Origin: Newmarket, Ontario, Canada
- Genres: Ska punk; reggae fusion; punk rock
- Years active: 1993–2016
- Label: Maui Wowie Records
- Members: Darren "Mista D" Dumas; Dave Ziemba; Chuck Dailey; Darrin Pfeiffer

The Salads are a punk rock band from Newmarket, Ontario, Canada, with strong reggae tendencies. They are currently signed to their own label, Maui Wowie Records, after having been signed to Kindling Music, a sub-division of Warner Music Canada.

== History ==
The band started under the name Lynx when its members were elementary school students at Kettleby Public School in King Township, Ontario.

School friends, drummer Grant Taylor and guitarist Dave Ziemba, started the group and soon added bassist Chuck Dailey to become a trio. Their early shows included local fairs and their elementary school graduation.

After high school, the band moved to Toronto with Darren Dumas joining as lead singer in 1997 as his original band was teetering on a breakup.

Libydo, a breakdancer who originally performed as part of dance group Back to Basics, was added later through connections with Dumas. His role was effectively a hypeman at concerts, though he described his role as "an instrument" through which a "physical representation of the high energy" would be represented.

In 2003, The Salads released their first album Fold A to B. It won several awards: a 2003 CASBY, a Canadian Radio Music Award, and Favourite Band at the Canadian Indie Awards.

The band began writing more songs and performing them, getting ready for the next round of recording. They played at EdgeFest in 2004,(including EdgeFest), and they spent two weeks playing Australia in late 2005 with The Presidents of the United States of America.

On their return, they began pre-production with Dan Brodbeck, and in January, a new record of 10 songs, The Big Picture, was completed. It included "Growing Up" (about life's changes as you get older), "Individual" (memories of 1980s thrash metal), "Circles" (watching the most intelligent person you know battle Alzheimer's), and "A Better Way" (trying for positive social change). The title "The Big Picture" was a reference to the complications of the music industry.

After two years of touring The Big Picture on the Warped tour, campus shows, and festivals, the members of The Salads decided to sever ties from their label and management. In August 2012, The Salads released a self-produced album entitled Music Every Day which features guest appearances by Angelo Moore (from the legendary Fishbone), Canadian musicians David Wilcox, Brian Byrne (from I Mother Earth), and Ryan Long (from The Johnstones). In 2013, the band performed at the KOI Music Fest.

== Band members ==
=== Current ===
- Darren Dumas aka Mista D: Vocals
- Chuck Dailey: Bass, Backing Vocals
- Dave Ziemba: Guitar
- Darrin Pfeiffer: Drums

=== Former members ===
- Grant Taylor: Drums, Backing Vocals
- Libydo: Dancer, Backing Vocals
- Ryan "Leg$" Leger: Drums
- David Summerfeldt: Bass, Vocals
- Mike Kerwin: Hand drums/other percussion during the days of "Meanwhile... the Salads".
- Mike Walsom: Dancing, Keyboards
- Alex Waite: Spoons, Saxophone
- Gavin Webb: Velour suits, percussion
- Dan Johnson: Keyboard

== Discography ==
=== Full-length albums ===
- Meanwhile...The Salads (1998)
- Fold A to B (2003)
- The Big Picture (2006)
- The Big Picture (Japanese edition + bonus tracks from Fold A To B) (2007)
- Music Every Day (2012)

=== EPs ===
- Who's That? (2001)
- Australian Pre-Release Promo (2005)
- The Big Remixes (2006)

=== DVD ===
- "The Salads: Band Gone Wild", 2004.
