= Fanshawe College's Music Industry Arts program =

Music Industry Arts
- Type: Public
- Established: 1970
- Affiliations: Fanshawe College
- Students: 210 approx.
- Location: London, Ontario, Canada
- Website: http://www.fanshawec.ca/programs-courses/full-time-programs/mia2

The Music Industry Arts Program at Fanshawe College trains students for careers in the contemporary music industry. It was started in 1970 as Creative Electronics by former Radio Caroline DJ Tom Lodge, but when the college demanded that Creative Electronics become a career program, Lodge had the students build a recording studio, gathered music industry executives for an advisory group and changed the name of the program to Music Industry Arts. The program has been the starting point for hundreds of acclaimed recording engineers, record producers, live performers, sound editors and entertainment industry executives. The program is highly competitive, receiving over 800 applications every year with only about 115 students being accepted. Students in the MIA program are also eligible for membership in a Student Section of the Audio Engineering Society.

== History ==
A part of the School of Contemporary Media, Fanshawe's Music Industry Arts (MIA) program was founded as Creative Electronics in 1973 by British disc jockey Tom Lodge formerly of Radio Caroline. With six professors and 35 students in its inaugural year, courses in the three-year program centered on electronics and music synthesizers. When the college demanded that Creative Electronics become a career program, he had the students build a recording studio, gathered music industry executives for an advisory group and in 1975 renamed the program Music Industry Arts (MIA). Along with the change in name, course offerings were expanded to include music recording and engineering, music production, artist development, live performance, music writing and audio post-production. In the mid-1980s, graduates continued to earn College of Applied Arts and Technology (CAAT) diplomas, but the length of the program was reduced to two years. In 2010 there were 11 MIA professors, three technologists, and two lab assistants. Audio post-production professor Steve Malison, who joined MIA in 1995, became the program coordinator in 2007. Dan Brodbeck became the program coordinator in May 2016. From 1984 until his retirement in 2007, Canadian music Producer Jack Richardson was also a professor of the MIA program. Kelly Samuel was also a professor of the social media course.

== Facilities ==
The Music Industry Arts program currently houses a total of six recording studios, a 20-station audio production lab, and a 120-seat live music performance venue. Its two main recording studios, Studio 1 (designated for first year students) and Studio 2 (for second year students) feature SSL Duality SE consoles which were installed in the summer months of 2010. Two smaller rooms, Studios 3 and 4, house SSL AWS 924 consoles. Recording is primarily done on Mac Pro systems utilizing Pro Tools and Logic software.

== Curriculum ==
First year courses include Artist Development, Recording Engineering, Music Theory, Music Production, Music Preproduction, Live Performance, and Music Lab. Second year students take courses such as Recording Engineering, Audio Post Production, Artist Development, Live Performance, Entertainment Law, Music Business, Music Production, and Music Industry Connections.

== Guest lecturers ==
Guest lecturers of note include:

- Bob Ezrin
- Phil Ramone
- Ken Scott
- Garth Richardson
- Greg Nori
- Fred Penner
- Bernie Finkelstein
- The Birthday Massacre
- Alan Cross
- Ralph Murphy
- Dala
- Corin Raymond
- Dan Weston

== Notable alumni ==
- Sarina Haggarty, songwriter
- John Keffer, television director
- Trevor Morris
- Les Stroud, Survivorman TV show
- Nathan Robitaille, sound editor
- Mike Roth
- Emm Gryner
- Kevin Banks, music editor
- Greg Below, Distort Entertainment
- Dave Wilson
- Deric Ruttan, songwriter
- Greg Hanna, Billboard Charting Artist
- Haviah Mighty, rapper
- Trevor Dubois, media personality
- Kelly Samuel, media personality
- Tom Trafalski, music editor
