= Killing for Love: Albums, Singles, Rarities, Unreleased 1987-2017 =

2023 box set by the Darling Buds

Box set by The Darling Buds
- Released: 27 October 2023
- Label: Cherry Red

The Darling Buds chronology
| Killing for Love: Albums, Singles, Rarities, Unreleased 1987-2017 (2023) | Same Sun / Same Sky (2026) |

Killing for Love: Albums, Singles, Rarities, Unreleased 1987-2017 is a five-CD compilation box set by Welsh band The Darling Buds. It was released by Cherry Red Records on 27 October 2023.

Curated and compiled by the band, the collection includes their early singles, their first three studio albums, B-sides, remixes, live recordings, the 2017 Evergreen EP and 14 previously unreleased recordings.

== Release and content ==
The set was issued by Cherry Red under catalogue number CRCDBOX152. Its accompanying booklet contains new interviews with the band, their notes on different periods of their career, an introductory essay by music journalist Lois Wilson and photographs from the band's private archive.

The first disc, titled The Early Years, collects demos, independent singles and other recordings from the period before the band's debut studio album. The second, third and fourth discs contain expanded versions of Pop Said... (1989), Crawdaddy (1990) and Erotica (1992), together with contemporary B-sides, remixes and alternative versions. The fifth disc contains demos, live recordings, previously unreleased material and the four tracks from the Evergreen EP.

The fifth disc includes three demos recorded in Los Angeles: "Perfect Pain", "Drag King" and "25". Louder Than War reported that the recordings were produced by Roy Bittan.. Vocalist Andrea Lewis Jarvis later said that the Los Angeles demos had been intended for a proposed fourth studio album following Erotica.

== Critical reception ==
Nick James of God Is in the TV awarded the collection eight out of ten. He highlighted the early demos, the stylistic range of the previously unreleased material and the Los Angeles recordings, and considered the collection a substantial account of the band's development.

Reviewing the box set for Louder Than War, Iain Key praised its presentation of the band's musical development and the range of rare and unreleased recordings. He regarded it as both an introduction for new listeners and a comprehensive retrospective for existing fans.

Backseat Mafia highlighted the chronological structure of the collection, the band-authored notes, previously unheard recordings and photographs from the group's archive. The review also noted the contribution of Wilson's essay to the historical presentation of the set.

== Track listing ==
Track listing adapted from Cherry Red.

Disc one: The Early Years
| No. | Title | Length |
|---|---|---|
| 1. | "Shame on You (Leeds Demo)" |
| 2. | "Mary's Got to Go (Leeds Demo)" |
| 3. | "Just to Be Seen (Leeds Demo)" |
| 4. | "If I Said" |
| 5. | "Just to Be Seen" |
| 6. | "Shame on You" |
| 7. | "Valentine" |
| 8. | "Uptight" |
| 9. | "It's All Up to You" |
| 10. | "Think of Me" |
| 11. | "That's the Reason" |
| 12. | "Burst (Early Version)" |
| 13. | "When It Feels Good (Early Version)" |
| 14. | "Spin (Flexi Version)" |

Disc two: Pop Said...
| No. | Title | Length |
|---|---|---|
| 1. | "Hit the Ground" |
| 2. | "Burst" |
| 3. | "Uptight" |
| 4. | "The Other Night" |
| 5. | "Big Head" |
| 6. | "Let's Go Round There" |
| 7. | "She's Not Crying" |
| 8. | "Shame on You" |
| 9. | "You've Got to Choose" |
| 10. | "Spin" |
| 11. | "When It Feels Good" |
| 12. | "Things We Do for Love" |
| 13. | "Just Say So" |
| 14. | "Shame on You (Slightlydelic Version)" |
| 15. | "Pretty Girl" |
| 16. | "If I Said" |
| 17. | "Hit the Ground (12" Version)" |
| 18. | "Turn You On" |
| 19. | "Different Daze" |
| 20. | "It's All Up to You (Flip Flop Version)" |
| 21. | "Mary's Got to Go" |
| 22. | "I'll Never Stop" |

Disc three: Crawdaddy
| No. | Title | Length |
|---|---|---|
| 1. | "It Makes No Difference" |
| 2. | "Tiny Machine" |
| 3. | "Crystal Clear" |
| 4. | "Do You Have to Break My Heart" |
| 5. | "You Won't Make Me Die" |
| 6. | "Fall" |
| 7. | "A Little Bit of Heaven" |
| 8. | "Honeysuckle" |
| 9. | "So Close" |
| 10. | "The End of the Beginning" |
| 11. | "Me? Satisfied?" |
| 12. | "Sugar City" |
| 13. | "Tripped Up" |
| 14. | "Tiny Machine (7" Version)" |
| 15. | "Tiny Machine (Hercules Mix)" |
| 16. | "Tiny Machine (Live)" |
| 17. | "Crystal Clear (A Mix Amethyst)" |
| 18. | "Crystal Clear (Extended Version)" |

Disc four: Erotica
| No. | Title | Length |
|---|---|---|
| 1. | "One Thing Leads to Another" |
| 2. | "Sure Thing" |
| 3. | "Off My Mind" |
| 4. | "Gently Fall" |
| 5. | "Please Yourself" |
| 6. | "Angels Fallen" |
| 7. | "Isolation" |
| 8. | "Long Day in the Universe" |
| 9. | "Wave" |
| 10. | "If" |
| 11. | "Love and Death" |
| 12. | "Long Day in the Universe (Remix)" |
| 13. | "Babyhead" |
| 14. | "Suffer" |
| 15. | "What Goes Around" |

Disc five: Rarities and Unreleased
| No. | Title | Length |
|---|---|---|
| 1. | "Honeysuckle (Demo)" |
| 2. | "Elevate Me (Demo)" |
| 3. | "Emaline (Demo)" |
| 4. | "Why Bother Now (Demo)" |
| 5. | "Thomas Dolby Intro" |
| 6. | "Off My Mind (Live and Acoustic in San Francisco)" |
| 7. | "Angels Fallen (Live in Chicago)" |
| 8. | "It Makes No Difference (Live in Chicago)" |
| 9. | "Hit the Ground (Live in Chicago)" |
| 10. | "Perfect Pain (LA Demo)" |
| 11. | "Drag King (LA Demo)" |
| 12. | "25 (LA Demo)" |
| 13. | "Evergreen" |
| 14. | "Guess the Good Parts" |
| 15. | "Complicated" |
| 16. | "Twenty-One Aches" |
