= Life Will Be the Death of Me =

2005 single by the Ordinary Boys

Single by the Ordinary Boys

from the album Brassbound
- Released: 29 August 2005
- Genre: Indie rock; ska
- Label: B-Unique
- Producer(s): Stephen Street

The Ordinary Boys singles chronology
"Boys Will Be Boys" (2005)	"Life Will Be the Death of Me" (2005)	"Nine2Five" (2006)

"Life Will Be the Death of Me" is a song by English band the Ordinary Boys from their second studio album, Brassbound (2005), released on the WEA sublabel B-Unique. The single, which features a cover version of the Ruts' "Babylon's Burning" on the B-side of the 7-inch single version, reached number 50 on the UK Singles Chart in September 2005.

== Critical reception ==
Critics noted a similarity to The Clash, particularly their version of "I Fought the Law". Ian Roullier of musicOMH compared the band's "reggae meets rock music" style to that of Madness and called the song "light-hearted in tone, upbeat in style and no doubt a lot of fun to dance to, but it won't re-write the history of rock and roll".

== Track listing ==
=== 7-inch single ===
1. "Life Will Be the Death of Me"
2. "Babylon's Burning"

=== CD single 1 (WEA394CD1) ===
1. "Life Will Be the Death of Me"
2. "Place in the Sun"

=== CD single 2 (WEA394CD2) ===
1. "Life Will Be the Death of Me"
2. "This Could Be the Night"
3. "Set Me Free"
4. "Life Will Be the Death of Me" (video)

=== 7-inch EP (WEA394) ===
1. "Life Will Be the Death of Me"
2. "Place in the Sun"
3. "This Could Be the Night"
4. "Set Me Free"
5. "Babylon's Burning"
6. "Life Will Be the Death of Me"

== Chart performance ==
Chart (2005)	Peak position
UK Singles (Official Charts Company)	50
