= How to Get Everything You Ever Wanted in Ten Easy Steps =

Studio album by The Ordinary Boys
- Released: 23 October 2006
- Label: B-Unique/Polydor
- Producer: Plastic Man

The Ordinary Boys chronology
Brassbound (2005)	How to Get Everything You Ever Wanted in Ten Easy Steps (2006)	The Ordinary Boys (2015)

Professional ratings
Review scores
Source	Rating
AllMusic	3/5 stars
CD Times	Unrated
Gigwise	3/5 stars
The Guardian	3/5 stars
The Independent	2/5 stars
musicOMH	3/5 stars
NME	5/10 stars

How to Get Everything You Ever Wanted in Ten Easy Steps is the third album by English indie band the Ordinary Boys, released following lead singer Samuel Preston's appearance on Celebrity Big Brother in January 2006. It was released on 23 October 2006 in the UK. It signified a transition in the band's sound from ska-inspired British indie to a more pop and disco one. The hit single "Boys Will Be Boys" is included as a bonus track. This song also featured on the band's second album, Brassbound, but was a success long after the release of the previous album.

The band put all of the songs from the album on their Myspace page for fans to listen to. The record has been billed by the band as their best album and the one which they are most proud of, but response from critics, fans and the general public was mixed and lukewarm. Andy Gill of The Independent rated it two stars, stating "the album's supposedly sardonic take on tabloid celebrity culture is fatally compromised by songwriter Preston's embrace of it." The album charted at No. 15. The last reported sales figures claimed that the album is their least successful sales-wise.

== Track listing ==
1. "Introducing the Brand"
2. "Lonely at the Top"
3. "The Great Big Rip Off"
4. "Club Chez-Moi"
5. "I Luv U"
6. "Nine2Five"
7. "Commercial Breakdown"
8. "Ballad of an Unrequited Self-Love Affair"
9. "The Higher the Highs"
10. "Shut Your Mouth"
11. "We've Got the Best Job Ever"
12. "Walking on the Faultlines (The Ultimate Step)"
13. "Thank You and Goodnight"
14. "Who's That Boy?" (Bonus Track)
15. "Boys Will Be Boys" (bonus track)
