= Shame on You =

Shame on You may refer to:

- "Shame on You", a condemning idiom used to scold.

== Music ==
- Shame on You (The Native Years), a 1989 compilation album by the Darling Buds
- "Shame on You" (Cooley song), 1945
- "Shame on You" (Indigo Girls song), 1997
- "Shame on You" (Tomas Thordarson song), Danish entry in the Eurovision Song Contest 2004
- "Shame on You (to Keep My Love from Me)", a 2007 song by Andrea Corr
- "Shame on You", a song by Aerosmith from Done with Mirrors, 1985
- "Shame on You", a song by the Darling Buds from Pop Said..., 1988
- "Shame on You", a song by Hot Hot Heat from Elevator, 2005
- "Shame on You", a song by Nik Kershaw from Human Racing, 1984
- "Shame on You", a song by Skylar Grey from the 2019 EP Angel with TattoosPop Said...
