= I Luv U (The Ordinary Boys song) =

Single by The Ordinary Boys

from the album How to Get Everything You Ever Wanted in Ten Easy Steps
- Released: 2007
- Songwriter(s): Samuel Preston

The Ordinary Boys singles chronology
"Lonely at the Top" (2006)	"I Luv U" (2007)	"Awkward" (2014)

"I Luv U" is a song by English indie rock group the Ordinary Boys, released in early 2007. The song was taken from their album How to Get Everything You Ever Wanted in Ten Easy Steps and features a distinctive double-bass line. It reached number seven in the UK Singles Chart, and number five in the UK Download Chart. The video for the song was recorded in an old TV studio, and shot on a vintage Ikegami camera. The video is set in a fictional 1970s style music cabaret, and was directed by U.K director Nick Collett.
