= Same Sun / Same Sky =

2026 studio album by the Darling Buds

Studio album by the Darling Buds
- Released: 31 July 2026
- Recorded: West Sound Studio, Newport, Wales
- Studios: West Sound Studio, Newport
- Genre: Indie pop
- Length: 41:17
- Label: Cherry Red Records
- Producer: Richard Jackson

The Darling Buds chronology
Killing for Love: Albums, Singles, Rarities, Unreleased 1987–2017 (2023)	Same Sun / Same Sky (2026)

Same Sun / Same Sky is the fourth studio album by Welsh indie pop band the Darling Buds. It was released by Cherry Red Records on 31 July 2026.

== Background and release ==
Same Sun / Same Sky was the band's first full-length album of new material since Erotica (1992), following the Evergreen EP in 2017. The album was recorded at West Sound Studio in Newport. The physical CD sleeve notes credit Richard Jackson as producer and engineer, James Young as additional engineer, and Cherry Red Records as the label under exclusive licence from The Darling Buds.

The album was issued on compact disc, vinyl and digital formats. Its catalogue number is CDBRED947.

== Composition ==
The album was described by Uncut as a return by the band to melodic guitar pop, with hooks and harmonies throughout. The review highlighted the jangling opener "Hey Saint Jude", the folky character of "Giddy In A Good Way" and the vocal performance of Andrea Lewis Jarvis.

God Is in the TV described "Hey Saint Jude" as setting the album's upbeat tone and discussed "Intruder", "Lost Time", "Jump In", "Cut Me Dead", "Giddy In A Good Way", "Paper Planes" and "Pollyanna Says". It characterised the album as drawing on the band's earlier sound while presenting them as re-energised.

== Critical reception ==
Uncut rated the album 7 out of 10, describing it as a record in which the band's late-1980s sound had settled into middle age while retaining its melodic qualities. God Is in the TV gave the album a score of 8 out of 10 and praised its consistency and songwriting. A review by A Pessimist Is Never Disappointed praised the guitar playing of Matt Gray and Paul Chaz Watkins, Lewis Jarvis's vocals and tracks including "Intruder", "Hey Saint Jude", "Oh No You Don't", "Lost Time", "Giddy In A Good Way" and "Pretenders". Silent Radio included the album in a release-week roundup and described it as recapturing the band's melodic energy.

== Track listing ==
Track listing and durations adapted from the band's official Bandcamp release page.

No.	Title	Length
1.	"Hey Saint Jude"	3:30
2.	"Intruder"	2:44
3.	"Oh No You Don't"	3:24
4.	"Lost Time"	2:58
5.	"Jump In"	3:20
6.	"Giddy In A Good Way"	3:56
7.	"Cut Me Dead"	3:45
8.	"Cast A Stone"	3:09
9.	"Pretenders"	3:22
10.	"Paper Planes"	3:14
11.	"Leaving The Scene"	3:27
12.	"Pollyanna Says"	4:28

== Personnel ==
Personnel adapted from the physical CD sleeve notes.

The Darling Buds

- Andrea Lewis Jarvis – vocals
- Paul Chaz Watkins – guitar and keyboards
- Erik Stams – drums and percussion
- Dave Corten – bass guitar
- Matt Gray – guitar

Additional credits

- Richard Jackson – production and engineering
- James Young – additional engineering
- Andrew Griffiths – brass
- Jamie Jarvis – photography
- Lora Findlay – layout and design

All songs are credited on the sleeve notes to David Corten, Matt Gray, Andrea Lewis, Erik Stams and Paul Watkins, and are published by Cherry Red Songs.

== Charts ==
Chart performance for Same Sun / Same Sky
Chart (2026)	Peak position
Scottish Albums (Official Charts)	74
UK Albums Sales (Official Charts)	51
UK Independent Albums (Official Charts)	14
