= Samuel Hynes =

American author (1924–2019)

Samuel Lynn Hynes (August 29, 1924 – October 9, 2019) was an American author. He won a Robert F. Kennedy Book Award for The Soldiers' Tale in 1998.

== Biography ==
Hynes was born in Chicago, Illinois. He attended the University of Minnesota and Columbia University.

Hynes served as a Marine Corps pilot from 1943 until 1946 and in 1952 and 1953. In a memoir, "Flights of Passage," Hynes explored in detail his pilot training and subsequent service in the Pacific during World War II. He received the Distinguished Flying Cross. He also discussed his experiences as a pilot in the documentary series The War by Ken Burns (2007). Burns interviewed Hynes again for The Vietnam War (2017), where Hynes discussed his experiences at Northwestern University during its anti-Vietnam War protests.

Hynes was a Fellow of the Royal Society of Literature and Woodrow Wilson Professor of Literature emeritus at Princeton University. His other books include On War and Writing (University of Chicago Press, 2018), A War Imagined, The Growing Seasons and The Unsubstantial Air: American Fliers in the First World War published by Farrar, Straus and Giroux in October 2014.

== Family ==
One of Hynes's children, daughter Miranda, has lived in the United Kingdom since the 1970s, where she is married to Briton Anthony Preston. Two of their children, Alex Preston (born 1979), an author and journalist, and his brother Samuel Preston (born 1982), lead singer of British band The Ordinary Boys, are among his grandsons.

== Death ==
Hynes died of congestive heart failure at the age of 95 in his home in Princeton, New Jersey, on October 9, 2019.
