= Andrea Lewis Jarvis =

Welsh singer, songwriter and theatre educator

- Also known as: Andrea Lewis
- Born: March 1967 (age 59)
- Occupations: Singer, songwriter, actor, broadcaster, theatre educator
- Years active: 1986-present
- Member of: The Darling Buds

Andrea Lewis Jarvis, also known professionally as Andrea Lewis, is a Welsh singer, songwriter, actor, broadcaster and theatre educator. She is a co-founder and the lead vocalist of the indie pop band The Darling Buds, which she formed in Caerleon, near Newport, in 1986. After the band's original period, she worked in theatre and broadcasting and later co-founded the Children's Academy of Stage Training in Cardiff.

== Early life ==
Andrea Lewis was born in Swansea in March 1967. She spent part of her childhood in Dorset before her family returned to Wales. She subsequently lived in Usk and attended Caerleon Comprehensive School.

== Career ==
=== The Darling Buds ===
Lewis formed the Darling Buds with guitarist Geraint "Harley" Farr in 1986. The band initially released its music independently before receiving airplay from John Peel and signing with Epic Records. Their debut studio album, Pop Said..., was released in 1989 and reached number 23 on the UK Albums Chart. The single "Hit the Ground" reached number 27 on the UK Singles Chart.

Lewis Jarvis recalled that the band's first single was recorded at Loco Studios in Llanhennock and financed by guitarist Geraint "Harley" Farr, who worked at the studio. She said that John Peel subsequently played "Just to Be Seen", while Janice Long played "If I Said" on radio.

In 1990, Lewis Jarvis and Farr appeared together in a print advertisement for Gap.

The band subsequently released Crawdaddy in 1990 and Erotica in 1992. Lewis was one of the band's principal songwriters. She said that she and Farr wrote most of its early material, with other members becoming increasingly involved in the songwriting process on later recordings.

Following an extended period in the United States, the original incarnation of the group ended in the early 1990s. Lewis later said that she avoided revisiting her music career for several years after the split.

=== Theatre, broadcasting and education ===
After leaving the band, Lewis Jarvis performed in original productions with Elan Theatre Company, touring in Belgium, Austria and the United States. She enrolled at the Royal Central School of Speech and Drama in 1996 and graduated in 1999.

After graduating, she co-presented the Saturday morning BBC Radio Wales programme The Weekenders with Gareth "Gaz Top" Jones. In 2003, she played Maid Marian in Full House Theatre Company's touring production Secrets of Sherwood - The Legend of Robin Hood.

In 2004, Lewis Jarvis and actor Jamie Jarvis established the Children's Academy of Stage Training (CAST) in Cardiff. The school initially offered Saturday performing-arts classes for children aged between six and 16. By 2010, Lewis Jarvis said that the organisation operated theatre schools in Cardiff and Newport attended by approximately 200 children.

Before establishing CAST, Lewis Jarvis had worked with children displaced by conflict in Azerbaijan.

=== Return to music ===
Lewis re-formed the Darling Buds for TJ's in the Square, an open-air Newport tribute to TJ's owner John Sicolo on 10 July 2010.

By 2015, she was the only founding member in the re-formed line-up, which had begun playing further headline shows and festivals.

The reunion subsequently developed into continuing live and recording activity.

In 2017, the band released the four-track Evergreen EP, its first collection of newly recorded material in more than 25 years. Lewis Jarvis later recalled that the members began writing songs together and decided to record them once several had been completed.

In 2023, Cherry Red Records released Killing for Love: Albums, Singles, Rarities, Unreleased 1987-2017, a retrospective box set curated and compiled by the band. Lewis said that its unreleased material included Los Angeles demos intended for a proposed fourth album during the band's original period.

The Darling Buds later recorded a fourth studio album, Same Sun / Same Sky, released by Cherry Red in July 2026.
