= Alex Preston (author) =

English author and journalist (born 1979)

- Born: 18 January 1979 (age 47); Worthing, West Sussex, England
- Education: Lancing College
- Alma mater: Hertford College, Oxford; University College London
- Occupations: Author and journalist
- Notable work: This Bleeding City (2010)
- Relatives: Samuel Preston (brother); Samuel Hynes (grandfather)
- Website: alexhmpreston.com

Alex Preston (born 18 January 1979) is an English author and journalist.

== Early life and education ==
Preston was born on 18 January 1979, in the seaside town of Worthing in West Sussex, England. He attended Sompting Abbotts Preparatory School and then received a scholarship to Lancing College independent boarding school. Preston graduated from Hertford College, Oxford, and went on to receive his PhD in English Literature from University College London.

== Career ==
Preston was working as an investment banker in the early 2000s when the banking market collapsed and he turned to teaching and writing.

Preston's first novel, This Bleeding City, was published by Faber & Faber in March 2010. The novel won the Spear's Best First Novel Prize, the Edinburgh International Book Festival Readers' First Book Award, and was chosen as one of Waterstone's New Voices 2010. This Bleeding City has been translated into 12 languages.

Preston's second novel, The Revelations, was published in February 2012, while his third, In Love and War, was featured on BBC Radio 4's Book at Bedtime. His fourth novel, Winchelsea, is a historical fiction novel based on the activities of the Hawkhurst smuggling gang and set in the 18th century on the Sussex coast, was published in late 2022 by Canongate Books. He is also the co-author of As Kingfishers Catch Fire, a memoir and anthology of literature about British birds.

Preston reviews books for a number of national newspapers and magazines and was a regular panelist on BBC2's The Review Show. He is Head of Advisory at Man Group.

In March 2026, The New York Times said it would no longer work with Preston after discovering that he had used AI to write a book review for the newspaper, which "included language and details similar to those in a review of the same book published in The Guardian." Preston explained that the material related to the Guardian review had been included in artificial intelligence LLM output when he used the software to draft his review and he failed to remove it from his final submission.

== Personal life ==
Preston plays cricket for the Authors Cricket Club and contributed a chapter to the team's book The Authors XI: A Season of English Cricket from Hackney to Hambledon. He became notable as player-umpire for asking of fellow novelist Richard Beard, "Do you think you were out?" in response to a bellowed LBW appeal. For this, Preston received the "Decision of the Season" award at their annual dinner.

Preston is the brother of Samuel Preston, former singer of The Ordinary Boys and Celebrity Big Brother contestant, and he is the grandson of Princeton University English professor and literary critic Samuel Hynes.

Preston lives in Kent, England, with his wife and two children.

== Bibliography ==
=== Novels ===
- This Bleeding City (2010). Faber & Faber.
- The Revelations (2012).
- In Love and War (2014).
- Winchelsea (2022).
- A Stranger in Corfu (2026).

=== Other ===
- As Kingfishers Catch Fire (2017), with Neil Gower. Little, Brown Book Group.
