= This Bleeding City =

2010 novel by Alex Preston

- First edition
- Author: Alex Preston
- Language: English
- Genre: Literary fiction
- Publisher: Faber & Faber
- Publication date: 4 March 2010
- Publication place: United Kingdom
- Media type: Print, ebook
- Pages: 352 pp
- ISBN: 9780571251704 (Paperback edition)
- OCLC: 467755311
- Dewey Decimal: 823

This Bleeding City is a 2010 novel by British author Alex Preston and his debut novel. The work was first published in the United Kingdom on 4 March 2010 through Faber & Faber. It is set during the 2008 financial crisis and follows a young trader named Charlie Wales. The novel won the 2010 Spear's Best First Novel Prize and the 2010 Edinburgh Festival Readers' First Book Award. It has been translated into twelve languages.

== Synopsis ==
Charlie Wales is a fresh new trader that is involved with Silverbirch, a lucrative hedge fund. However while he is intelligent, Charlie is easily distracted by his fast-paced new life. He's intrigued by the seductive Vero, a beautiful French woman, and by the lure of easy money and the excitement of a seemingly endless supply of drugs. His friends do little to dissuade him, as they appear to be caught up in the same type of habits and life that Charlie is experiencing. However, as things proceed and Charlie sinks deeper into a life of excess and depravity, he discovers that this may end up leading to his own ruin- and he may not be able to extract himself before it happens.

== Reception ==
Critical reception for This Bleeding City has been mixed. The Scotsman and The Guardian both gave mostly negative reviews of the work; the reviewer writing as The Guardian wrote that "This Bleeding City conjures some voyeuristic curiosity as a novel of our age, but I suspect it lacks the perspective to outlive it." In contrast, The New Statesman and the Financial Times both praised the work, with the Financial Times writing that "Though the book has a few flaws, it is enjoyable and worth reading for the narrative drive. Preston’s style is both spare and rich, brutal and deft."
