= Over the Counter Culture =

Studio album by The Ordinary Boys
- Released: 5 August 2004
- Recorded: 2003–2004 at Jacobs Studios and The Bunker
- Genre: Indie rock
- Length: 38:34
- Label: B-Unique / Warner Music
- Producer: Stephen Street

The Ordinary Boys chronology
Over the Counter Culture (2004)	Brassbound (2005)

Professional ratings
Review scores
Source	Rating
AllMusic	4/5 stars
BBC	Favourable
entertainment.ie	4/5 stars
NME	8/10
Stylus Magazine	D+

Over the Counter Culture is the debut studio album by English indie rock band the Ordinary Boys. The album received critical praise and spawned the singles "Maybe Someday", "Week In Week Out", "Talk Talk Talk", and "Seaside". On its initial release in the UK, there was an ordinary version and a Special Edition of the album issued. The Special Edition of the album included a second disc, a bonus limited edition live EP of the band recorded live at the Carling Academy in Birmingham on June 4, 2004. The tracks on the live EP, mixed by Stephen Street, are "The List Goes On", "(Little) Bubble", "Talk Talk Talk" and "Maybe Someday". The title track "Over the Counter Culture" was featured on the Burnout 3: Takedown soundtrack.

== Track listing ==
All songs written by The Ordinary Boys except where noted

1. "Over the Counter Culture" – 3:15
2. "The List Goes On" – 2:53
3. "Week In Week Out" – 3:26
4. "Talk Talk Talk" – 3:12
5. "Little Bitch" (Jerry Dammers) – 2:24
6. "Settle Down" – 4:12
7. "Weekend Revolution" – 3:05
8. "Maybe Someday" – 2:19
9. "Just a Song" – 3:53
10. "Seaside" – 3:29
11. "In Awe of the Awful" – 2:49
12. "Robots and Monkeys" – 3:30

Bonus Live Disc

1. "The List Goes On" [Live]
2. "(Little) Bubble" [Live]
3. "Talk Talk Talk" [Live]
4. "Maybe Someday" [Live]
