= Tiger (band) =

English rock band

- Origin: Princes Risborough/London, England
- Genres: Alternative rock, indie rock, punk rock
- Years active: 1996–99
- Labels: Fierce Panda, Island, Trade 2
- Past members: Dan Laidler; Julie Sims; Tina Whitlow; Dido Hallett; Gavin Skinner; Craig 'Ed' Grimshaw; Louis Jones; Seamus Feeney

Tiger were an English indie rock band from Princes Risborough and London, England, who were formed in 1996.

Tiger quickly got British press attention after their debut and single "Shining in the Wood" was played on BBC Radio 1. The musical climate of the time was dominated by Britpop and retro bands influenced by Oasis. Tiger, who were characterised by fuzzy guitars and multiple keyboards, were quickly held up as part of a new alternative.

The band had two keyboardists using synthesizers and used droning song structures similar to Stereolab and Neu!, but with a stronger pop element. The band were often criticised for their (lack of) fashion sense: they wore outdated clothes and at least two members of the band had mullet haircuts, which, although they became fashionable, were out of place at the time.

The band recorded and released their 1996 debut album We are Puppets less than a year after they first formed. The album's singles, "Race", "My Puppet Pal", and "On The Rose" were minor successes although only "Race" reached the Top 40 of the UK Singles Chart.

NME invited them to perform on their Brat Bus Tour in 1997.

In late 1998, they supported Pulp, but any impetus had been lost by this point and they were dropped from their record label shortly after. Their Stephen Street-produced second album Rosaria eventually appeared on the Tugboat label in 1999, but shortly afterwards they split up.

== Line-up ==
- Dan Laidler: vocals, guitar
- Julie Sims: guitar, vocals
- Tina Whitlow: keyboards, guitar
- Dido Hallett: keyboards, bass guitar
- Seamus Feeney: drums
- Gavin Skinner: drums (on the 2nd album)
- Craig 'Ed' Grimshaw (drummer from Warm Jets) on debut single "Shining In The Wood"
- Louis Jones (singer & guitarist from Warm Jets) on debut single "Shining In The Wood"

== Discography ==
Tiger discography
- Studio albums: 2
- Extended plays: 1
- Singles: 7

The discography of Tiger consists of two studio albums, an extended play, six singles, and "Best in Bucks"; a one-off collaboration single with keyboardist Fleas, and Duncan Goddard from Radio Massacre International.

=== Studio albums ===
| Year | Album details | UK |
|---|---|---|
| 1996 | We Are Puppets: Released: 22 November 1996; Labels: Trade 2, Island | 108 |
| 1997 | Shining in the Wood (EP): Released: 22 April 1997; Labels: Bar/None Records, Trade 2, Island | – |
| 1999 | Rosaria: Released: May 1999; Labels: Tugboat Records | – |

=== Singles ===
| Year | Title | UK | Album |
|---|---|---|---|
| 1996 | "Shining in the Wood" | 135 | — |
| 1996 | "Race" | 37 | We Are Puppets |
| 1996 | "My Puppet Pal" | 62 | We Are Puppets |
| 1997 | "On the Rose" | 57 | We Are Puppets |
| 1997 | "Best in Bucks" (limited single with and as 'Fleas') (B-sides: "Sports Day" and "Nasty Landscapes") | – | — |
| 1998 | "Friends" | 72 | Rosaria |
| 1998 | "Girl From the Petrol Station" | N/R | Rosaria |
