= Famous First Words (Viva Brother album) =

Studio album by Viva Brother
- Released: 1 August 2011
- Recorded: 2011
- Studio: Angelic Studio (Brackley, Northamptonshire) and Sofa Sound Studios (London)
- Genre: Britpop revival
- Label: Geffen
- Producer: Stephen Street

Viva Brother chronology
Famous First Words (2011)	II (2017)

Singles from Famous First Words
- 1. "Darling Buds of May" Released: November 2010; 2. "Still Here" Released: March 2011; 3. "New Year's Day" Released: May 2011

Famous First Words is the debut studio album by English rock band Viva Brother, released on 1 August 2011 on Geffen Records in the United Kingdom. Preceded by the singles "Darling Buds of May", "Still Here" and "New Year's Day", the album was produced and mixed by Stephen Street, who had previously worked with acts such as Blur and The Smiths.

== Reception ==
Professional ratings
Aggregate scores
Source	Rating
Metacritic	34/100
Review scores
Source	Rating
AllMusic	2/5 stars
Clash	5/10
The Guardian	2/5 stars
The Independent	1/5 stars
The Irish Times	3/5 stars
Mojo	2/5 stars
musicOMH	2/5 stars
NME	5/10
The Observer	1/5 stars
Pitchfork	2.9/10

The album was panned by critics upon release, with reviewers criticising the lack of original content and the clumsiness with which the band attempted to emulate popular acts of the 1990s. On Metacritic, the album received a score of 34/100, indicating "generally unfavorable reviews". Alexis Petridis of the Guardian likened the band to a tragicomedy and remarked that "Viva Brother haven't got a new idea in their heads – as every song fades out, you somehow imagine the theme music from TFI Friday fading in". Martin Headon of musicOMH praised certain aspects of the album, but noted that overall it was clichéd, had "few arresting melodies" and lacked courage. Similarly, Hari Ashurst of Pitchfork lamented the "chugging guitar and infant grade lyrics", ultimately judging the album to be "pretty brainless stuff, the special kind that makes you feel somehow stupider for having listened". John Meagher of the Irish Independent wrote that Viva Brother "might just be responsible for the most uninspired, downright awful British album of the year".

NME's Emily Mackay gave the album a more moderate score of 5/10, commenting positively on "New Year's Day" and "Darling Buds of May", but going on to criticise the rest of the songs, saying, "there's no lyrical content here with lasting weight or worth much comment at all..." The review ultimately described the album as "disappointing [and] formulaic". Many reviewers pointed out that while Viva Brother attempted to be a lad rock act, they ended up only producing dad rock.

== Track listing ==
All tracks are written by Viva Brother.

No.	Title	Length
1.	"New Year's Day"	3:22
2.	"Still Here"	4:03
3.	"David"	3:12
4.	"High Street Low Lives"	3:02
5.	"Electric Daydream"	3:46
6.	"Darling Buds of May"	3:15
7.	"Otherside"	3:40
8.	"Fly by Nights"	2:50
9.	"False Alarm"	3:49
10.	"Time Machine"	3:17
Total length:		34:16

iTunes bonus track
No.	Title	Length
11.	"Shoot Like Lightning"	2:49
