= Viva Brother =

English rock band

- Origin: Burnham, England
- Genres: Indie rock, Britpop revival
- Years active: 2010–2012, 2017–present
- Label: Geffen
- Spinoffs: Lovelife
- Members: Leonard Newell; Joshua Ward; Samuel Jackson; Franklin Colucci

Viva Brother are an English rock band from Burnham, Berkshire. Previously known as Brother, they signed to Geffen Records in October and EMI Publishing in November 2010. Their debut album, Famous First Words, was released on 1 August 2011, and reached #34 on the UK Albums Chart. It was confirmed on 1 April 2012 that Viva Brother had split up. In June 2012, the band members launched a new band, the synthpop group Lovelife. Viva Brother uploaded a cryptic video to their social media platforms on 22 September 2017, hinting at an announcement on 3 October. The band confirmed they were reuniting on 3 October, with their first show to be played at The Garage in London on 30 November.

== History ==
=== Formation and debut album (2010–2012) ===
Previously known as Kill the Arcade and Wolf Am I, the band was renamed Brother in 2010. The previous incarnation of the group wrote, recorded and performed music primarily in the emo genre. Describing their latest sound as "gritpop", and citing bands such as Blur, the Smiths and Morrissey as influences, the band began playing shows around the local community centres. In an interview for Drowned in Sound, Leonard Newell stated that his musical interest began to change after he started going to a club night called We love the 90's. A demo of the song "Darling Buds of May" was played by radio 1 DJ Zane Lowe on BBC Radio 1. Lowe also picked up on the band's blog. The site featured a video of the band setting up and playing an unannounced gig in front of Slough railway station, along with a promo video they had shot using money they had earned playing local gigs. In October they signed a deal with Geffen Records and EMI Publishing the following November.

In January 2011, Brother entered the studio with Stephen Street to record their debut album. On 5 March, the band appeared on the early morning football show Soccer AM, and revealed the name for their album would be Famous First Words, after discussing it in the canteen just half an hour before the interview. They released their debut single, "Darling Buds of May", on 27 June 2011. This was followed by three more singles, "New Year's Day", released 8 May 2011, and "", released 27 June 2011. In June 2011, the band was forced to change their name from Brother to Viva Brother due to a lawsuit brought by another band, also called Brother. Leonard Newell admitted that his band went ahead with the previous name change from Wolf Am I to Brother despite being aware of the fact that other musicians were already using the name.

Viva Brother released their debut album, Famous First Words, on 1 August 2011. The album, panned by critics for its lack of original content, peaked at #34 on the UK Albums Chart in its first week of release. On 3 October 2011, the band released their final single from Famous First Words, "Time Machine".

=== Second album and breakup (2012–2016) ===
The band released images of the recording their second album in the countryside on their official Twitter page, with hopes of the album being released that year. It was announced on 1 April 2012 that the band had split up, although this was initially thought to be an April fools joke - the disbanding of Viva Brother was confirmed later that day. Viva Brother reformed as pop group Lovelife consisting of Newell, Jackson, Colucci and Ally Young, formerly of band 'Mirrors'.

=== Reunion (2017–present) ===
Viva Brother uploaded a cryptic video to their social media platforms on 22 September 2017, hinting at an announcement on 3 October. The band confirmed they were reuniting on 3 October, with their first show to be played at The Garage, in London, on 30 November. The band also released a brand new track, "Bastardo", via Spotify.

== Discography ==
=== Studio albums ===
Title	Album details	Peak chart positions	
Title	Album details	UK	JPN
Famous First Words	Released: 1 August 2011; Label: Geffen; Formats: CD, DL, LP	34	46
II	Released: 17 November 2017; Label: Pretty; Formats: DL	—	—

=== Singles ===
Year	Single	Peak chart positions	Album
Year	Single	US Alt	Album
2011	"Darling Buds of May"	39	Famous First Words
2011	"Still Here"	—	Famous First Words
2011	"New Year's Day"	—	Famous First Words
2011	"Time Machine"	—	Famous First Words
2017	"Bastardo"	—	II
2017	"Womankind"	—	II
2017	"I Don't Wanna Be Loved"	—	II
"—" denotes that the single did not chart.
