= Evergreen (The Darling Buds EP) =

2017 EP by the Darling Buds

EP by The Darling Buds
- Released: 21 April 2017
- Label: Odd Box

The Darling Buds chronology
Erotica (1992)	Evergreen (2017)	Killing for Love (2023)

Evergreen is an extended play by Welsh indie pop band The Darling Buds, released by Odd Box Records on 21 April 2017. It was the band's first collection of newly recorded material since its third studio album, Erotica, in 1992.

The four-track EP was released digitally and in limited editions on 10-inch vinyl and cassette. Its title track was accompanied by a music video.

== Background and release ==
The Darling Buds originally disbanded after the release of Erotica and later reunited for performances beginning in 2010. In 2015, Lewis Jarvis and Matt Gray said that the band had performed two new songs and intended to record further material when schedules allowed; Lewis Jarvis described the new work as a progression from Erotica. By the time Evergreen was recorded, the line-up comprised vocalist Andrea Lewis Jarvis, bassist Chris McDonagh, guitarists Matt Gray and Paul "Chaz" Watkins, and drummer Erik Stams.

Lewis Jarvis later recalled that the members began writing songs together following the reunion and decided to record them after completing several compositions.

Odd Box Records issued Evergreen in a limited run comprising 100 copies on green vinyl, 150 on black vinyl and 50 cassettes, alongside a digital release. Norman Records subsequently listed a 500-copy 10-inch edition under catalogue number ODD083. The sleeve artwork was created by Julian House.

The EP was later included in full on the fifth disc of the band's 2023 retrospective box set, Killing for Love: Albums, Singles, Rarities, Unreleased 1987-2017.

== Composition ==
Evergreen contains four guitar-pop songs. The title track and "Guess the Good Parts" retain elements associated with the band's earlier recordings, while "Complicated" and the slower closing track, "Twenty One Aches", move towards different rhythmic and stylistic approaches.

Lewis Jarvis said that the reunited band's songwriting involved contributions from all five members, rather than following the more concentrated writing process used during the band's original period.

== Critical reception ==
A reviewer for Collective Zine described the EP as bright and infectious, noting that its 1990s-style guitar pop nevertheless sounded fresh after the band's extended absence. The review highlighted the title track's guitar flourishes and the slower character of "Twenty One Aches".

Isolation Records praised the mixture of styles across the four tracks. Its review compared the first side with the band's early Epic Records material, while describing "Complicated" and "Twenty One Aches" as departures from their established sound.

Clinton of Norman Records awarded the EP six out of ten. He praised the title track's chorus and characterised the release as direct indie guitar music with strong hooks, while considering its style closely tied to the band's earlier work.

God Is in the TV selected the title track as its "Video of the Week", highlighting its guitar-led arrangement, chorus and drumming.

== Track listing ==
Track listing adapted from Slicing Up Eyeballs.

No.	Title	Length
1.	"Evergreen"
2.	"Guess the Good Parts"
3.	"Complicated"
4.	"Twenty One Aches"

== Personnel ==
Personnel adapted from contemporary release coverage.

The Darling Buds

- Andrea Lewis Jarvis - vocals
- Chris McDonagh - bass guitar
- Matt Gray - guitar
- Paul "Chaz" Watkins - guitar, keyboards
- Erik Stams - drums

Artwork

- Julian House - sleeve design
