= Shining in the Wood =

EP by Tiger
- Released: 22 April 1997
- Genre: Alternative rock, indie rock, pop punk
- Length: 17:42
- Label: Bar/None, Trade 2, Island
- Producer: Tiger, Daren Eskriett, Louis Jones

Tiger chronology
We Are Puppets (1996)	Shining in the Wood (1997)	Rosaria (1999)

Professional ratings
Review scores
Source	Rating
AllMusic	4/5 stars
Robert Christgau	A

Shining in the Wood is an extended play by the British band Tiger. Released in the US to good reviews, the EP collects together the title track and its two B-sides from the "Shining in the Wood" UK single and the three B-sides from the "Race" single. The EP was produced by Daren Eskriett and the band-themselves, with the exception of "Honey Friends" which was produced by the band with Louis Jones. The EP was a useful companion to the We Are Puppets studio album, as none of the tracks had previously been released in the US.

"Where's the Love?" and "Bicycle" originally appeared on the "Shining in the Wood" single released June 1996 (Fierce Panda Records).

"Honey Friends", "Time Tunnel Cellar" and "I'm in Love with RAF Nurse" originally appeared on the "Race" single released August 1996 (Trade 2, Island)

== Track listing ==
All tracks are written by Tiger

No.	Title	Length
1.	"Shining in the Wood"	3:45
2.	"Where's the Love?"	3:49
3.	"Honey Friends"	3:19
4.	"Time Tunnel Cellar"	2:09
5.	"Bicycle"	2:42
6.	"I'm in Love with RAF Nurse"	1:55

== Personnel ==
Tiger

- Dan Laidler - Vocals, Guitar
- Julie Sims - Guitar, Vocals
- Tina Whitlow - Keyboards, Guitar
- Dido Hallett - Keyboards
- Seamus Feeney - Drums

Other personnel

- Tiger - producer
- Daren Eskriett - producer (all tracks except "Honey Friends")
- Louis Jones - producer ("Honey Friends")
- Warsaw - Sleeve
