= We Are Puppets =

Studio album by Tiger
- Released: 22 November 1996
- Genre: Indie-pop
- Length: 41:56
- Label: Trade 2, Island
- Producer: Daren Eskriett, Tiger, Pete Briquette

Tiger chronology
We Are Puppets (1996)	Shining in the Wood (1997)

Singles from We Are Puppets
- 1. "Race" Released: August 1996; 2. "My Puppet Pal" Released: November 1996; 3. "On the Rose" Released: February 1996

We Are Puppets is the début studio album by the British band Tiger. It was released in 1996 and reached number one-hundred and eight on the UK Albums Chart. We Are Puppets includes the singles "Race", "My Puppet Pal" and "On the Rose", the latter of which was re-recorded for single release.

The album was produced by Daren Eskriett and the band, with the exception of "My Puppet Pal" which was produced by the band with Pete Briquette. Receiving mixed reviews the album was first released by the Island sub-label Trade 2 as a CD and LP in November 1996.

== Critical reception ==
Professional ratings
Review scores
Source	Rating
AllMusic	4.5/5 stars

The Independent wrote that "We Are Puppets consists of 12 spiky pop songs that quiver with buzzy-fuzzy guitar and one-singer synth lines, like the noisier tracks from the first Modern Lovers album, except with Dan Laidler's fearless yelp careening over the top."

== Track listing ==
All tracks are written by Tiger.

No.	Title	Length
1.	"My Puppet Pal"	3:08
2.	"Shamed All Over"	3:31
3.	"Race"	3:25
4.	"Bollinger Farm"	3:41
5.	"Storm Injector"	3:19
6.	"Depot"	3:11
7.	"On the Rose"	3:33
8.	"Sorry Monkeys"	3:13
9.	"Cateader Reddle"	3:51
10.	"She's OK"	2:10
11.	"Ray Travez"	2:25
12.	"Keep in Touch"	6:29

== Personnel ==
Tiger

- Dan Laidler - Vocals, Guitar
- Julie Sims - Guitar, Vocals
- Tina Whitlow - Keyboards, Guitar
- Dido Hallett - Keyboards
- Seamus Feeney - Drums

Other personnel

- Tiger - Producer
- Daren Eskriett - Producer
- Pete Briquette - Additional Production, Mixing, Producer ("My Puppet Pal), Mixing ("My Puppet Pal")
- Dave Bernez - Mastering

== B-sides ==
from "Race"

- "Honey Friends" - 3:19
- "Time Tunnel Cellar" - 2:10
- "I'm in Love with RAF Nurse" - 1:56

from "My Puppet Pal"

- "Icicle" - 3:53
- "Flea's Song" / Bonus Track - 5:57 (with Fleas)

from "On the Rose"

- "On the Rose (New Recording)" - 2:49
- "On Spanish Farmland" - 3:36
- "Babe" - 2:56
- "Ray Travez (Soho live)" - 2:20
- "Depot (Mark Radcliffe Show)" - 2:20
- "I'm in Love with RAF Nurse (Mark Radcliffe show)" - 1:52
