= The Ordinary Boys (album) =

Studio album by The Ordinary Boys
- Released: 2 October 2015
- Recorded: 2014–2015
- Genre: Indie rock
- Label: Treat Yourself Records
- Producer: Rory Attwell, Matt Johnson

The Ordinary Boys chronology
How to Get Everything You Ever Wanted in Ten Easy Steps (2006)	The Ordinary Boys (2015)

The Ordinary Boys is the self-titled fourth studio album by The Ordinary Boys released on 2 October 2015. The album spawned the singles "Awkward" and "Four Letter Word". It was produced by Rory Attwell of Test Icicles and Matt Johnson of Hookworms.

== Track listing ==
1. "About Tonight"
2. "Awkward"
3. "Four Letter Word"
4. "I'm Leaving You (And I'm Taking You with Me)"
5. "Losing My Cool"
6. "Cruel"
7. "Panic Attack"
8. "Do or Die"
9. "Almost Ready"
10. "Putting My Heart on the Line"
11. "Disposable Anthem"
12. "Heard You Wanna Beat Me Up" (Bonus Track)
13. "Creep on Me" (Bonus Track)

== Personnel ==
- Samuel Preston – vocals, rhythm guitar
- Louis Jones – lead guitar, additional vocals
- James Gregory – bass
- Charles "Chuck" Stanley – drums
