= Brassbound =

Studio album by The Ordinary Boys
- Released: 20 June 2005
- Genre: Indie rock
- Label: B-Unique / Warner
- Producer: Stephen Street

The Ordinary Boys chronology
Over the Counter Culture (2004)	Brassbound (2005)	How To Get Everything You Ever Wanted in Ten Easy Steps (2006)

Professional ratings
Aggregate scores
Source	Rating
Metacritic	(50/100)
Review scores
Source	Rating
AllMusic	3.5/5 stars
NME	6/10 stars

Brassbound is the second studio album by the Ordinary Boys, released in 2005. It contains the singles "Boys Will Be Boys" and "Life Will Be the Death of Me". The album reached No. 11 on the UK Albums Chart in February 2006, whereas it charted outside the top 30 upon initial release in 2005.

There was a special edition of the album released in the UK at the same time as a standard version, as there had been with their previous album Over the Counter Culture. The special edition of Brassbound came in a cardboard slipcase and also included a DVD as a second disc. The DVD contained live footage of the band performing "Boys Will Be Boys", "Brassbound" and "Life Will Be the Death of Me" as well as the documentary Bank Holiday Binge. The album was dismissed as being derivative and unoriginal by critics, and the band themselves have since admitted to the album to being lacklustre and said they were lacking in purpose and imagination when making the record.

== Track listing ==
All songs written by The Ordinary Boys

1. "Brassbound" – 3:02
2. "Boys Will Be Boys" – 2:40
3. "Life Will Be the Death of Me" – 2:21
4. "Thanks to the Girl" – 2:56
5. "On an Island" – 2:50
6. "One Step Forward (Two Steps Back)" – 3:15
7. "Skull and Bones" – 2:52
8. "Don't Live Too Fast" – 2:45
9. "Call to Arms" – 4:01
10. "Few Home Truths" – 3:41
11. "Rudi's in Love" – 3:18
12. "Red Letter Day" – 5:27

== Charts ==
Chart (2006)	Peak position
UK Albums (OCC)	11
