= Thousand Yard Stare (band) =

English band

- Thousand Yard Stare, 1992

Background information
- Origin: Slough, Berkshire, England
- Genres: Alternative rock, indie pop
- Years active: 1989–1993, 2015–present
- Labels: Stifled Aardvark Co. Records; Polydor Records
- Members: Stephen Barnes; Dominic Bostock; Giles Duffy; Floyd Foreman; Sean McDonough
- Past members: Alex Lidgate; Kevin Moxon
- Website: www.thousandyardstare.co.uk

Thousand Yard Stare are an English band from Slough, Berkshire, England, active during the early 1990s, prior to the Britpop explosion. Supporting popular bands on the indie circuit such as James and Carter The Unstoppable Sex Machine, the band also released several EPs. Reformed in 2015, the band played a sold-out show at London's Borderline on 6 June, at the Nottingham Rock City Wake-Up Indie Alldayer on 17 October 2015, and at the Shiiine On Weekender festival at Butlins Minehead on 6 November 2015. More dates were scheduled for 2016 and they released full-length record in 2020 and 2022.

== History ==
The band's debut effort, the Weatherwatching EP was released in November 1990 on Stifled Aardvark Records, the band's own record label. Both the Easter 89 and Tumbletown EPs were demo tapes made up by the band and sold at gigs prior to their first official release, the 12" vinyl only Weatherwatching. In a response to this record, NME nominated Thousand Yard Stare as "brightest hope for the future". Following in June 1991, the Keepsake EP reached the top spot in both the NME and Melody Maker independent charts. That summer the band performed at the Reading Festival, further raising their profile and leading to their stint as support for James in October and November of that year. In the Autumn, the band began the sessions for their first album, Hands On, the first fruit of which was another EP. Seasonstream EP was released on Stifled Aardvark Records in 1991, their last independent release on their own label. The Seasonstream EP began with a track titled "0-0 a.e.t", (which means "No Score After Extra Time"), a football metaphor laden song that featured Martin Bell of The Wonder Stuff on fiddle. 0-0a.e.t appeared as the first track on the Hands On LP. This single again topped the Indie music charts, and reached number 65 in the UK Singles Chart. With the backing of the major label Polydor, Thousand Yard Stare went on to release a further three EPs, and two studio albums. Hands On and Mappamundi were both produced by Stephen Street, who had already produced records for The Smiths and Blur. In the summer of 1992, Thousand Yard Stare played the NME Stage at the Glastonbury Festival.

However, neither of the albums made much of an inroad into the mainstream market, and the band became eclipsed by the burgeoning Britpoppers such as Suede, Blur and Elastica, and Mappamundi proved to be their final release in 1993.

After the band split, Barnes went on form a new band Click with, amongst others, Philip Wigg (Wiggy), a long-time collaborator with Billy Bragg. Click released one single, Julia's Reactor, and two albums, If It Ain't Broke Don't Fix It and 'Til The Cows Come Home. The remaining members of Thousand Yard Stare teamed up with Nick Steele, their engineer and occasional producer, to form Euphoria - they also released one single, Stationary Man. Duffy later went on to feature in another band, Republic of Heaven, in 2005.

Outside of Thousand Yard Stare, Bostock worked as a chiropractor in the Slough area, Barnes worked as a music plugger and band manager in Bristol, Moxon moved to Dunfermline and worked as an accountant, while Duffy worked for the Pension Regulator and McDonough became a social worker in Brighton.

The band reformed in 2015 and have made further recordings and live appearances, including releasing two albums, The Panglossian Momentum in 2020 and Earthanasia in 2022.

== Discography ==
=== Albums ===
- Hands On Aard 008 (February 1992 - LP (some with free 10" Live EP) /CD/Cassette)
- Fair to Middling Aard 011 (1992 - LP/CD - compilation of Weatherwatching, Keepsake and Seasonstream EPs.)
- Mappamundi Aard 013 (May 1993 - LP/CD/Cassette)
- Live at Electric Studios Aard 014 (2016 - CD/Digital)
- Gallimaufry (The EPs 89-93) (2017 - Digital)
- The Panglossian Momentum Aard 021 (2020 - LP/CD/Digital)
- Earthanasia (14 October 2022 - Cassette/CD/Digital)

=== EPs ===
- Easter 89 EP Aard 001 (1989 - demo cassette only)
- Tumbletown EP Aard 002 (1990 - demo cassette only)
- Weatherwatching EP Aard 003 (January 1991 - 12" vinyl only release)
- Keepsake EP Aard 004 (May 1991 - CD/12"/10" release) (UK No. 82)
- Seasonstream EP Aard 005 (July 1991 - CD/12"/Limited Edition Blue Vinyl 10" release) (UK No. 65)
- White Label EP Aard 006 (November 1991 - one sided 12" vinyl available at the band's London ULU gig in November 1991)
- Comeuppance EP Aard 007 (February 1992 - 7"/CD/12"/Limited Edition Red Vinyl 10" release) (UK No. 37)
- Live Bootleg EP Aard 009 (February 1992 - 10" only, available as a limited edition with early copies of 'Hands On', or from the bands mail order store)
- Spindrift EP Aard 010 (July 1992 - CD/12"/Limited Edition Green Vinyl 10"/Limited Edition Clear Vinyl 10" release) (UK No. 58)
- Version of Me EP Aard 012 (May 1993 - 2 x CD/12" release) (UK No. 57)
- DeepDreaming EP/ StarGrazing EP Aard 015/016 (2017 - CD/Digital release)
- Remix EP (2018 - Digital release)

=== Singles ===
- It Sparks! (27 September 2019 - Promo CD/Digital)
- Schism Algorithm (7 February 2020 - Promo CD/Digital)
- Precious Pressures (26 April 2020 - Promo CD/Digital)
- Upping Sticks (8 October 2021 - Promo CD/Digital)
- Measures (25 March 2022 - Promo CD/Digital)
- Adverse Cambers (20 May 2022 - Promo CD/Digital)
- Isadora (22 July 2022 - Promo CD/Digital)
- Esprit du Corps (23 September 2022 - Promo CD/Digital)

== Band members ==
- Stephen Barnes (vocals)
- Dominic Bostock (drums)
- Giles Duffy (lead guitar)
- Floyd Foreman (rhythm guitar)
- Sean McDonough (bass guitar)

Former members

- Alex Lidgate (rhythm guitar)
- Kevin Moxon (rhythm guitar)
