= The Real People (album) =

Studio album by The Real People
- Released: May 6, 1991
- Recorded: 1990–1991
- Genres: Britpop, indie rock, psychedelic rock
- Length: 39:54
- Labels: Columbia Records, Relativity Records
- Producers: Paul Hardiman, Stephen Street, The Real People

The Real People chronology
Mini L.P. (1988)	The Real People (1991)	Marshmellow Lane (1992)

Singles from The Real People
- 1. "Open Up Your Mind (Let Me In)" Released: 1990; 2. "Window Pane" Released: 1990; 3. "The Truth" Released: 1991

The Real People is the major label debut album by British band the Real People, released in 1991. It was distributed by Columbia Records in the UK and Relativity Records in the US. Although the album was preceded by the band's debut Mini L.P. in 1988, The Real People was ultimately the band's breakthrough as it contained their first charting singles (one of which, "Window Pane", charted in both the UK and US).

Despite the album's success, the band's follow-up, Marshmellow Lane, was cancelled by Columbia just prior to its release in late 1992; thus, another album did not appear for nearly five years until What's on the Outside in 1996 (although Marshmellow Lane was eventually released in 2012).

== Background ==
After the demise of JoJo and the Real People, brothers Chris and Tony Griffiths regrouped under a shortened name (The Real People) and a different lineup (Tony Elson on drums and Sean Simpson on guitars). Elson was a close friend of the brothers while Simpson previously attended the same school as Chris Griffiths. After the band released Mini L.P. in 1988, they played numerous shows in pubs and other small-scale locations. The band found the pub circuit difficult as most fans expected cover songs, whereas The Real People focused on original material. They eventually landed a record deal with both Columbia Records and Relativity Records. Previously under their old moniker, the band released a few singles on the major label Polydor Records, but never a full-length album.

Although The Real People managed their own studio space, the band worked alongside two other producers at different times, Stephen Street and Paul Hardiman. Some of the album's songs were initially written in 1988 and 1989; thus, those tracks had a dance-oriented sound, while other tracks had more of an emphasis on straightforward rock. The album's sound was eventually compared to other bands such as The La's (who were also friends with The Real People in the 1980s), The Beatles, Happy Mondays, and The Stone Roses.

== Commercial performance and promotion ==
In late 1990, The Real People embarked on a college tour of the UK. They then followed it up with a brief tour of the UK in the spring of 1991, which ended when The Real People was released on May 6, 1991. The Real People peaked at No. 59 on the UK Albums Chart. Three singles also charted in the UK: "Open Up Your Mind (Let Me In)" at No. 70, "Window Pane" at No. 60, and "The Truth" at No. 41.

"Window Pane" managed to peak at No. 11 on the Modern Rock Tracks Chart in the US. Around the same time, the band embarked on a lengthy tour of the US, which ended in the summer of 1992. Overall, The Real People expressed disappointment in their label's lack of promotion in the UK when compared to their experience in the US.

== Subsequent events ==
Around the same time that The Real People were working on their second major label album, they befriended the band Oasis. At that point, Oasis were not signed to any labels, but The Real People saw potential in the young band and spent several months with them at their studio. Meanwhile, The Real People planned to follow up their self-titled album with Marshmellow Lane. The lead single for Marshmellow Lane, "Believer", became a Top 40 hit in the UK as it peaked at No. 38 in late 1992; however, Columbia cancelled the album outright, and the band departed from the label soon after.

The Real People continued their relationship with Oasis however, which eventually led to the Live Demonstration tape by Oasis. Ultimately, Tony Griffiths was credited as a backing vocalist on "Supersonic" and Chris Griffiths was credited as a writer on "Rockin' Chair". Oasis' original drummer, Tony McCarroll, frequently mentioned The Real People in his autobiography years later, and he cited them as a crucial factor in the success of his band.

The Real People eventually scrapped the Marshmellow Lane material in favor of newer material for the 1996 album What's on the Outside, although both Elson and Simpson were no longer in the lineup by that point. Marshmellow Lane was belatedly released in 2012 shortly after the Griffiths brothers reformed the band.

== Track listing ==
All tracks are written by Tony Griffiths and Chris Griffiths.

No.	Title	Length
1.	"Window Pane"	3:34
2.	"I Can't Wait"	3:16
3.	"For You"	2:52
4.	"The Truth"	3:24
5.	"Everyday's the Same"	3:01
6.	"Wonderful"	2:46
7.	"Open Up Your Mind (Let Me In)"	3:33
8.	"She"	4:06
9.	"In Your Hands"	3:24
10.	"Looking at You"	3:34
11.	"Words"	3:04
12.	"Another Day"	3:00

== Personnel ==
- Tony Griffiths – bass, vocals
- Chris Griffiths – guitars, vocals
- Sean Simpson – guitars
- Tony Elson – drums
- Stephen Street – producer (tracks 1, 4, 12)
- Paul Hardiman – producer (tracks 3, 5, 10, 11)
- The Real People – producer (tracks 2, 6–9)
- Guy Forest – engineer (tracks 2, 5, 6)
- Mike Haas – engineer (tracks 7–9)
- Paul Gomersall – engineer (7, 8, 12)
- Youri Lenquette – photography

== Charts ==
=== Album ===
Chart (1991)	Peak position
UK Albums (OCC)	59

=== Singles ===
Song	Peak chart positions	
Song	US Rock	UK
"Open Up Your Mind (Let Me In)"	—	70
"The Truth"	—	41
"Window Pane"	11	60
"—" denotes a release that did not chart.
