= Rosaria (album) =

Studio album by Tiger
- Released: 24 May 1999
- Genre: Alternative rock, Indie rock
- Length: 49:19
- Label: Tugboat Records
- Producer: Stephen Street, Donald Ross Skinner

Tiger chronology
Shining in the Wood (1997)	Rosaria (1999)

Singles from Rosaria
- 1. "Friends" Released: August 1998; 2. "Girl From the Petrol Station" Released: October 1998 (withdrawn)

Professional ratings
Review scores
Source	Rating
NME	6/10 stars

Rosaria is the second and final studio album by the British band Tiger. It was released on CD only in 1999 and includes the singles "Friends" and "Girl From the Petrol Station", the latter of which was aborted prior to release. The album was produced by Stephen Street, with the exception of "Birmingham" and "Bee Song" which were produced by Donald Ross Skinner. The art direction was produced by Stephen Male with graphic design by Latifah Cornelius and painting by lead vocalist Dan Laidler.

Having been dropped by Island sub-label Trade 2 soon after the release of "Friends" in the autumn of 1998, the album was released to little fanfare and publicity on CD by the small Tugboat Record label in May 1999. The group had been touring the album in support of Pulp on a UK tour. Losing the impetus and financial backing to continue, the group split up shortly after the release of Rosaria.

== Track listing ==
All lyrics are written by Dan Laidler; all music is composed by Tiger

No.	Title	Length
1.	"Friends"	3:39
2.	"I Was a Rolling Stone"	4:07
3.	"Speak to Me"	3:55
4.	"Girl From the Petrol Station"	5:22
5.	"Candy and Andy"	3:24
6.	"Birmingham"	4:34
7.	"Root Cage"	3:26
8.	"Soho Soul"	5:04
9.	"Bee Song"	3:14
10.	"Our Simple Life"	3:33
11.	"River"	4:27
12.	"Rox Baroque"	4:34

== Personnel ==
Tiger

- Dan Laidler - Vocals, Lyrics, Paintings
- Julie Sims - Guitar, Vocals
- Tina Whitlow - Keyboards
- Dido Hallett - Moog Bass, Bass Guitar

Other personnel

- Gavin Skinner - Drums, Percussion, Piano ("Candy and Andy" and "Our Simple Life"), Harpsichord ("Candy and Andy")
- Stephen Street - Producer, Mixing
- Donald Ross Skinner - Producer ("Birmingham" and "Bee Song")
- Cenzo Townshend - Engineer
- Stephen Male - Art Direction
- Latifah Cornelius - Graphic Design
- Dan Laidler - Paintings

== B-sides ==
from "Friends"

- "Wensleydale" - 3:12
- "Bottle Of Juice" - 2:23
- "White Saab, Dark Night" - 3:12 (with Fleas)
- "Rogue Robyn" - 3:10

from "Girl From the Petrol Station" (aborted single)

- "Girl From the Petrol Station" (edited version) - 3:49
- "Paul Young" - 3:36
- "Sea Shandy" - 2:35
- "God It's Good" - 3:36
- "Rolling Rose" - 2:47
