= The Real People =

English rock band

- Origin: Liverpool, England
- Genres: Alternative rock, indie rock, Britpop
- Years active: 1986–1998, 2002, 2008–present
- Label: CBS
- Website: The Real People's official website

The Real People are an English rock band formed in Liverpool in 1986. The band currently consists of Tony Griffiths (bass, vocals), Chris Griffiths (guitars, vocals), Martin Lappin (guitar), Tony McGuigan (drums), and James Breckon (keyboards).

Formed in 1986 by the Griffiths brothers, the band was initially known as JoJo and the Real People with Dave Reilly (drums), Jay Norton (keyboards), Phil Coxon (guitars), and Gordon Morgan (guitars), although Norton departed from the band prior to any studio recordings. They released a few singles which were not a success. Following the shortened name change, Tony Elson replaced Reilly on drums, and Sean Simpson replaced Morgan and Coxon on guitars. After a debut album in 1988, The Real People found success in 1991 with their self-titled album.

Despite a few singles charting in the UK, the band's follow-up album in 1992 was cancelled by the band's label, and Simpson departed from the band. The Real People then discarded the material and focused on another album, which was released in 1996. Around that time, the lineup changed numerous times, until the band went on a hiatus in 1998. They reformed for a few live shows in 2002, followed by another reunion in 2008 which eventually spawned two albums in 2010 and 2016.

== History ==
=== Formation, initial success, and first hiatus (1986–1998, 2002) ===
Initially called JoJo & the Real People, the band started playing in local clubs and later toured as support act for the Inspiral Carpets, Ocean Colour Scene, the Pixies, Simple Minds, David Bowie, and others throughout the 1990s and onwards.

The group signed a management deal with local entrepreneur Mick Swift of Whitehouse Management, Bold Street, Liverpool in 1986. Their first record deal was brokered with Polydor Records in 1987, after Swift had persuaded Eddie Lundon of Kirkby band China Crisis to produce the demo of their debut single "One by One". The band also signed a publishing deal with Polygram. After "One by One", which would later become a top 10 hit for Cher in 1996, the band released a cover of Bob Crewe and Kenny Nolan's "Lady Marmalade", which was produced by Phil Harding at PWL with Stock Aitken Waterman acting as executive producers. Even though both songs would provide top ten hits for other artists in the 1990s, neither song charted for JoJo & the Real People in the 1980s.

The band self-released Mini L.P. in 1988. The following year, now managed by Jeffrey Abbotts, they were signed as the Real People by CBS on the Columbia label, although CBS were subsequently bought out by Sony. During this time, under the management of Jeffrey Abbotts, they toured extensively, including a major tour of the US, Japan, Europe, etc. They released their self-titled major label debut album The Real People on 6 May 1991. All the songs were written by Chris and Tony Griffiths. This reached number 59 on the UK Albums Chart. They recorded the follow-up album, Marshmellow Lane, for CBS, but although the Chris Allison produced "Believer", the first single from the album, charted at No. 38 and another single, "Too Much Too Young", appeared soon afterwards, the album was never actually released. Several tracks subsequently appeared on a two band compilation album called Liverpool – The Calm Before the Storm, released in 1996 on the Columbia label. Tony and Chris Griffiths went on to set up their own recording studio (Realistic Studios) in Birkenhead, Wirral, and started their own label Egg Records.

Their next album, What's on the Outside, was released independently under their own label on 4 November 1996. It was critically acclaimed but failed to make the charts. Although another album called Closer was reported to be in preparation in 2002, it was never released; however, the Real People played a few live performances in 2002.

==== The Real People and Oasis ====
Oasis were still unsigned when Noel Gallagher first met Tony Griffiths of the Real People when he was a roadie to the Inspiral Carpets. In 1992, determined to make a professional sounding demo, he contacted Griffiths and asked him to help record something to send out to record companies.

Paul Moody of the NME reported:-

'Used to the hard-knock school of the Manchester scene, Oasis were shocked by the co-operation of their scouse mates. "Because we'd got our own eight-track studio we let them come down to the Dock Road and record there," says Tony. "They were quite naive about recording, so we'd show them how to play the songs, how to think about the structure of the songs and the dynamics. We were just helping them because that's what bands do in Liverpool. I don't think it's quite the same in Manchester, because no one had done anything for them before."'

The result was the eight-song music demo (later dubbed the Live Demonstration tape) recorded in Liverpool in 1993 that got Oasis their first record deal. The tape included many of the songs that eventually featured on the band's first album Definitely Maybe.

Chris and Tony Griffiths' input into the writing and recording process has since been fully acknowledged by Oasis. Tony Griffiths is credited with providing vocals on "Supersonic" on Definitely Maybe. Chris Griffiths also co-wrote "Rockin' Chair" with Noel Gallagher in 1993. This was released as the B-side to the single of "Roll with It" in 1995, and also appeared on the album The Masterplan. Chris Griffiths also claimed to have written the lyrics for "Columbia", with Liam Gallagher being responsible for the chorus, although the song is officially credited to Noel Gallagher only. Oasis Drummer Tony McCarroll tells the same story in his book Oasis: The Truth. They are both included in the documentary made for the Definitely Maybe 10th Anniversary DVD.

=== Continued career (2008–present) ===
In 2006, "Losing a Friend" was released in the UK as a single by the Icelandic girl group Nylon. It reached top 20 in the UK chart. Another Real People cover, "Closer" was the second single release from the group in October 2006. Both songs were number ones in Iceland.

They also wrote several tracks for the debut solo album by ex-Atomic Kitten, Natasha Hamilton. "Reaching Out" (co-written with Alistair Griffin and James and Tom Martin) was recorded by the Northern Irish band Bel's Boys and appeared on their 2007 album People Lets Go.

Chris and Tony Griffiths continue to perform live, both as solo artists and as backing for other bands. In November 2006 the Real People played a special benefit concert at the Carling Academy in Liverpool, for the mental health charity C.A.L.M. following another successful live gig in December. The Real People supported The Pretenders at the Liverpool Summer Pops, on 9 July 2007 at the Aintree Pavilion Arena, Aintree Racecourse. They also appeared at Liverpool Arena on 19 January 2008 as part of The Number One Project singing a cover of "Hey Jude". This was later released on the charity album Liverpool – The Number Ones Album. They have since played at the Carling Academy on 21 March 2008, at the Echo Arena supporting Duran Duran and also at the Cockpit in Leeds.

Their long delayed fourth studio album, Think Positive, was released on 6 December 2010. They continued to play gigs through 2010 and 2011, and more recently in March 2012 in York. In May 2012, Marshmellow Lane was eventually released.

The Real People's latest album, Monday Morning Breakdown, was released on the 28 October 2016, through Townsend Records.

In 2018, the band performed as part of the high profile Star Shaped Festival tour at venues including the iconic Brixton Academy.

== Members ==
=== Current ===
- Chris Griffiths – guitars, lead vocals (1986–1998, 2002, 2008–present)
- Tony Griffiths – bass, lead vocals (1986–1998, 2002, 2008–present)
- Tony McGuigan – drums (1996–1998, 2002, 2008–present)
- Martin Lappin – guitars (2002, 2008–present)
- James Breckon – keyboards (2022–present)

=== Former ===
- Russ Mitchinson – keyboards (1996–1998)
- Alan Gillibrand – guitars (1995–1996)
- Garry Ford – drums (1995–1996)
- Tony Elson – drums (1988–1995)
- Sean Simpson – guitars (1988–1992)
- Phil Coxon – guitars (1986–1988)
- Gordon Morgan – guitars (1986–1988)
- Dave Reilly – drums (1986–1988)
- Jay Norton – keyboards (1986–1987)

=== Timeline ===
Colour denotes main live duty

== Discography ==
=== Albums ===
Year	Title	UK Albums Chart
1988	Mini L.P. (Note: Originally released in 1988 on cassette, followed by a proper reissue in 2012.)	—
1991	The Real People	59
1992	Marshmellow Lane (Note: Initially meant to be released in late 1992, but not given a wide release until 2012.)	—
1996	What's on the Outside	—
2010	Think Positive	—
2016	Monday Morning Breakdown	—

=== Singles ===
Year	Title	UK Singles Chart	Album
1987	"One by One" (Note: Released under the band name "Jo Jo and the Real People".)	—	Non-album singles
1987	"Lady Marmalade"	—	Non-album singles
1990	"Window Pane"	60	The Real People
1991	"Open Up Your Mind (Let Me In)"	70	The Real People
1992	"The Truth"	41	The Real People
1992	"Believer"	38	Marshmellow Lane
1993	"Too Much Too Young"	—	Marshmellow Lane
1995	"Bring You Down"	—	What's on the Outside
1995	"Going Nowhere"	—	What's on the Outside
1995	"Every Vision of You"	138	What's on the Outside
1996	"Rayners Lane"	98	What's on the Outside
1996	"Rolling Stone"	106	What's on the Outside
1997	"The People in the Telly"	155	What's on the Outside

"Window Pane" also peaked at #11 on the US Modern Rock Tracks chart in 1992.
