= The Darling Buds =

Welsh alternative rock band

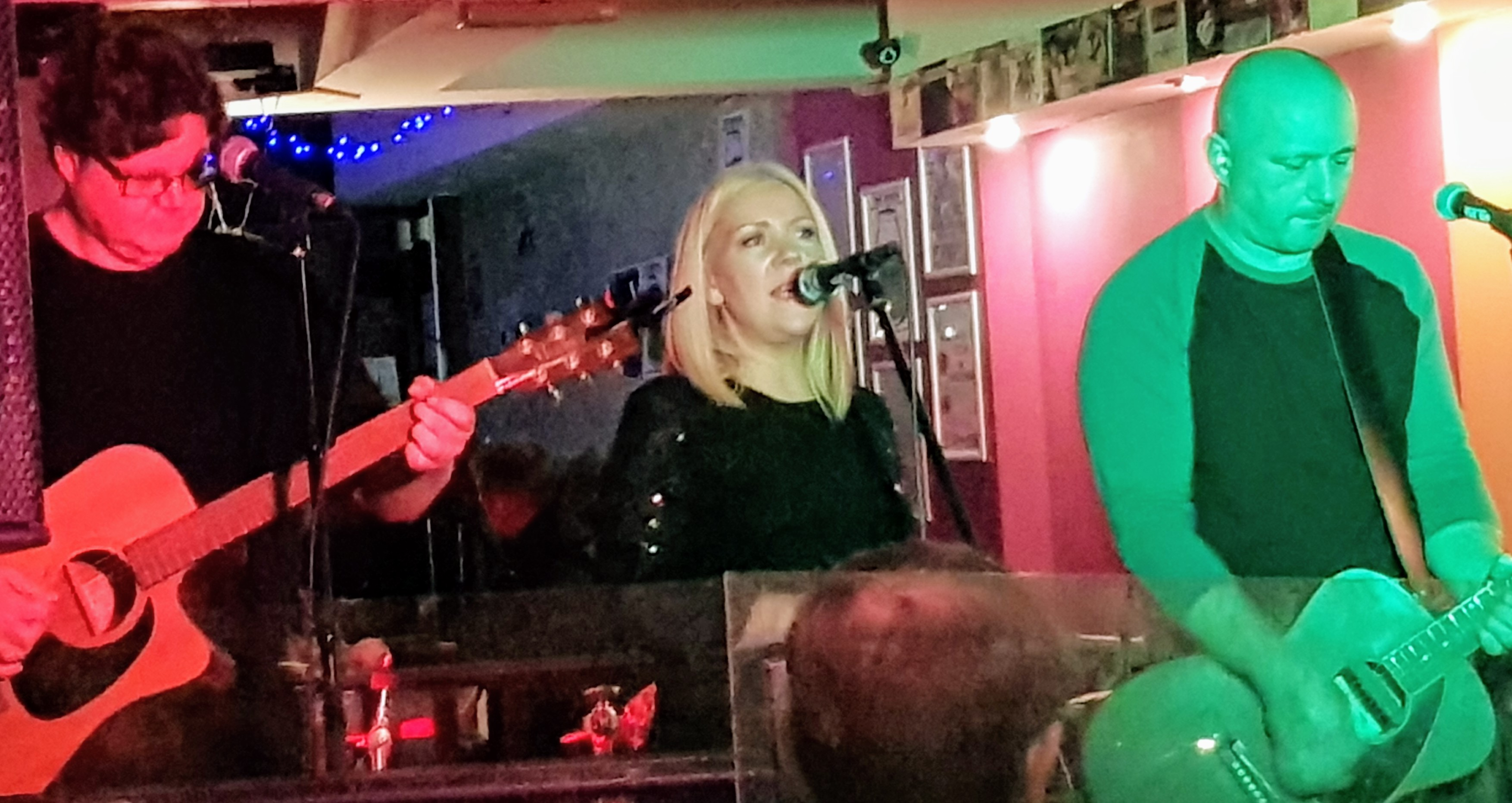
- The Darling Buds in December 2017

Background information
- Origin: Caerleon, Newport, Wales
- Genre: Indie pop
- Years active: 1986–1993; 2010; 2013–present
- Labels: Native, Epic, Columbia, Odd Box, Cherry Red
- Members: Andrea Lewis Jarvis; Matt Gray; Paul "Chaz" Watkins; Erik Stams; Dave Corten
- Past members: Geraint "Harley" Farr; Simon; Chris McDonagh; Richard "Bloss" Gray; Jimmy Hughes; Jon Lee; Dennis McCarthy
- Website: thedarlingbuds.bandcamp.com

The Darling Buds are a Welsh indie pop band formed in Caerleon, near Newport, in 1986. Fronted by vocalist Andrea Lewis Jarvis, the group first gained attention through independently released singles and airplay from John Peel before signing with Epic Records. Their debut studio album, Pop Said... (1989), reached number 23 on the UK Albums Chart, while the single "Hit the Ground" reached number 27 on the UK Singles Chart.

The band released two further studio albums, Crawdaddy (1990) and Erotica (1992), before disbanding following touring in the United States. They reunited in 2010 and returned to regular live activity from 2013. Their subsequent work has included the Evergreen EP (2017), several digital and limited-edition releases, and the five-CD retrospective Killing for Love (2023). A fourth studio album, Same Sun / Same Sky, was released by Cherry Red Records on 31 July 2026.

The band's name was taken from H. E. Bates's novel The Darling Buds of May, whose title derives from the third line of William Shakespeare's Sonnet 18.

== History ==
=== Formation and Pop Said... (1986–1989) ===
The Darling Buds were formed in Caerleon, near Newport, in 1986 by vocalist Andrea Lewis, then aged 19, and guitarist Geraint Farr, who performed under the name "Harley". The original line-up included a bassist known as Simon, and the group initially used a drum machine. The band independently released its debut single, "If I Said", in February 1987. The single was subsequently reissued by Native Records. Lewis later recalled that John Peel played "Just to Be Seen", while Janice Long played "If I Said" on BBC Radio 1.

Lewis and Farr were later joined by bassist Chris McDonagh and drummer Richard "Bloss" Gray. The band signed with Sony in 1988, with releases appearing through Epic Records. The singles "Shame on You", "Burst" and "Hit the Ground" preceded the band's debut studio album, Pop Said..., in 1989. The album reached number 23 on the UK Albums Chart, while "Hit the Ground" reached number 27 on the UK Singles Chart.

The group performed "Hit the Ground" on Top of the Pops on 12 January 1989; Lewis later described it as the band's only appearance on the programme. The band was also featured on the covers of Melody Maker and the 7 January 1989 issue of NME around the album's release.

=== Crawdaddy, Erotica and disbandment (1990–1993) ===
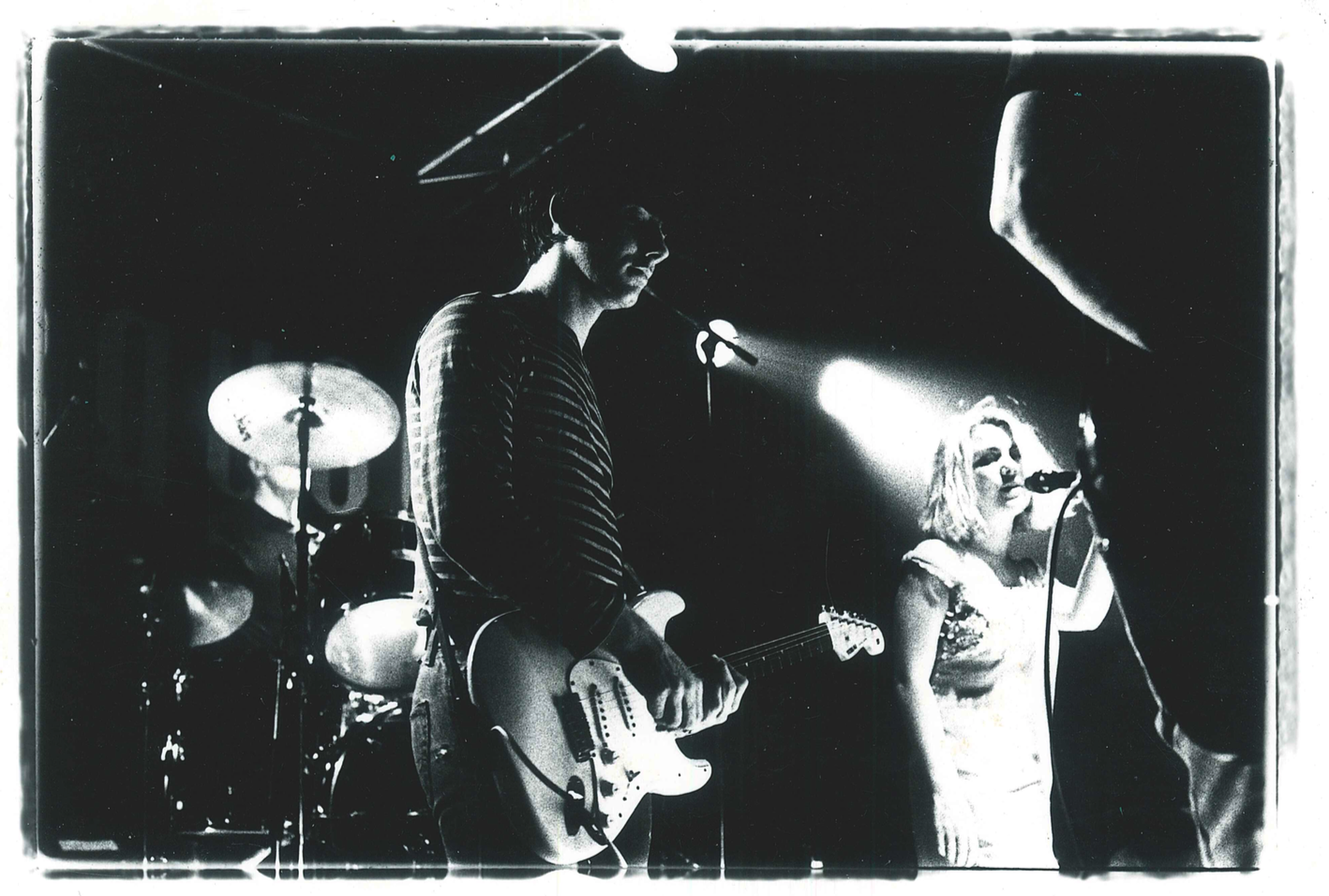
The Darling Buds at the Marquee Club (c. 1990)

Gray left the band in 1990 and was replaced by Jimmy Hughes, formerly of Black. The band's second studio album, Crawdaddy, was released later that year. Its singles included "Tiny Machine", "Crystal Clear" and "It Makes No Difference". "Crystal Clear" reached number five on the US Modern Rock Tracks chart, while "It Makes No Difference" reached number 13. Lewis later said that producer Stephen Street encouraged the band to experiment, helping distinguish the album from its debut.

The third studio album, Erotica, followed in 1992. Its singles included "Sure Thing", which reached number 71 on the UK Singles Chart, and "Please Yourself", which reached number 22 on the US Modern Rock Tracks chart. "Long Day in the Universe" was later included on the soundtrack to the 1993 film So I Married an Axe Murderer.

After touring in support of Erotica, including an extended run in the United States, the group disbanded. A 2012 retrospective in Q attributed the split to financial and organisational problems after the band relocated to Los Angeles. Lewis later recalled that members were homesick, between record deals and considering other projects, and said that the split was not caused by a falling-out.

=== Reunion and Evergreen (2010–2018) ===
The Darling Buds reunited on 10 July 2010 at TJ's in the Square, an open-air Newport tribute to TJ's owner John Sicolo. Founding members Farr and McDonagh did not take part in the 2010 tribute. A further reunion concert, announced in October 2013, was held the following April at the Borderline in London, preceded by a show at Le Pub in Newport. Although initially presented as a one-off, the response led to additional festival and headline performances during 2014 and 2015.

The revived group developed into a five-piece comprising Lewis Jarvis, McDonagh, Matt Gray, guitarist and keyboard player Paul "Chaz" Watkins, and drummer Erik Stams. The band continued performing and began writing new material, resulting in the four-track Evergreen EP. It was released by Odd Box Records on 21 April 2017 and was the band's first collection of newly recorded material in more than 25 years. The EP was issued digitally and in limited editions on 10-inch vinyl and cassette.

Later in 2017, the band recorded a version of the Go-Go's song "Our Lips Are Sealed" for a Cassette Store Day compilation. In December 2018, the group released a digital cover of the Sugababes song "New Year".

=== Later recordings and Same Sun / Same Sky (2020–present) ===
During 2020 and 2021, the band issued several digital and limited-edition recordings, including a remix of material from the Evergreen EP, a pandemic-era re-recording of "Isolation", and the single "Jump In" for Record Store Day.

In 2023, Cherry Red Records released Killing for Love: Albums, Singles, Rarities, Unreleased 1987–2017, a five-CD retrospective curated and compiled by the band. The set collected the three original studio albums, early singles, B-sides, remixes, the Evergreen EP and 14 previously unreleased recordings. Andrea Lewis Jarvis said that the collection included demos recorded in Los Angeles for a proposed fourth album following Erotica.

The band's fourth studio album, Same Sun / Same Sky, was preceded by the singles "Intruder" on 5 June 2026, "Lost Time" on 26 June and "Hey Saint Jude" on 17 July.

Same Sun / Same Sky was released on CD, vinyl and digital formats by Cherry Red on 31 July 2026. "Jump In" is included on the album.

== Musical style ==
Critic Doug Brod described the Darling Buds' early work as part of a late-1980s revival of girl-group pop, comparing their sound to Blondie and characterising Pop Said... as upbeat, hook-focused pop. He wrote that Crawdaddy introduced greater stylistic variety and groove-oriented production, while Erotica retained the band's emphasis on hooks while adding more distortion.

In a 2026 interview, Andrea Lewis Jarvis said that Crawdaddy incorporated more dance-oriented rhythms and different vocal approaches, and that the band's music reflected the varied influences of its members. She described the songwriting as initially led by Lewis and Geraint "Harley" Farr, with other members contributing increasingly over time. She said that Watkins had contributed to songs on Crawdaddy and Erotica, while Matt Gray became involved in writing B-sides after joining the band in 1992.

== Members ==
=== Current members ===
- Andrea Lewis Jarvis - vocals (1986–1993, 2010, 2013–present)
- Matt Gray - guitar (1992–1993, 2010, 2013–present)
- Paul "Chaz" Watkins - guitar, keyboards (1992–1993, 2010, 2013–present)
- Erik Stams - drums (2010, 2013–present)
- Dave Corten - bass guitar (2018–present)

=== Former members ===
- Geraint "Harley" Farr - guitar (1986–1993)
- Simon - bass guitar (1986)
- Chris McDonagh - bass guitar (1987–1993, 2010, 2013–2018)
- Richard "Bloss" Gray - drums (1987–1990)
- Jimmy Hughes - drums (1990–1992)
- Jon Lee - drums (1992)
- Dennis McCarthy - drums (1993)

== Discography ==
=== Studio albums ===
Studio albums, with selected peak chart positions
Title	Album details	Peak chart positions	
Title	Album details	UK	AUS
Pop Said...	Released: 1989; Label: Epic	23	139
Crawdaddy	Released: 1990; Label: Epic	—	166
Erotica	Released: 1992; Label: Epic	—	—
Same Sun / Same Sky	Released: 31 July 2026; Label: Cherry Red Records; Formats: CD, LP, digital download	—	—

=== Extended plays ===
Extended plays
Title	Details
Evergreen	Released: 21 April 2017; Label: Odd Box Records; Formats: 10-inch vinyl, cassette, digital download

=== Compilation albums ===
Compilation albums
Title	Details
Shame on You (The Native Years)	Released: 1990; Label: Native Records
Killing for Love: Albums, Singles, Rarities, Unreleased 1987–2017	Released: 2023; Label: Cherry Red Records; Format: five-CD box set

=== Singles ===
Year	Song	Peak chart positions			Album
Year	Song	UK	AUS	US Alt.	Album
1987	"If I Said"	—	—	—	Non-album singles
1988	"It's All Up to You"	86	—	—	Non-album singles
1988	"Shame on You"	—	—	—	Pop Said...
1988	"Burst"	50	—	—	Pop Said...
1988	"Hit the Ground"	27	147	—	Pop Said...
1989	"Let's Go Round There"	49	—	27	Pop Said...
1989	"You've Got to Choose"	45	—	—	Pop Said...
1990	"Tiny Machine"	60	—	—	Crawdaddy
1990	"Crystal Clear"	85	—	5	Crawdaddy
1990	"It Makes No Difference"	—	—	13	Crawdaddy
1992	"Sure Thing"	71	—	—	Erotica
1992	"Please Yourself"	—	—	22	Erotica
1992	"Long Day in the Universe"	—	—	—	Erotica
2018	"New Year"	—	—	—	Non-album single
2026	"Intruder"; Released: 5 June 2026	—	—	—	Same Sun / Same Sky
2026	"Lost Time"; Released: 26 June 2026	—	—	—	Same Sun / Same Sky
2026	"Hey Saint Jude"; Released: 17 July 2026	—	—	—	Same Sun / Same Sky
"—" denotes a release that did not chart or was not released in that territory.

=== Other releases ===
Selected other releases
Year	Title	Notes
2017	"Our Lips Are Sealed"	Cover of the Go-Go's song, recorded for a Cassette Store Day compilation.
2018	"Evergreen"	Reached number 94 on the UK Physical Singles Chart on 23 August 2018.
2018	"New Year" Released: 17 December 2018	Cover of the Sugababes song "New Year".
2020	"21 Aches (The Rise and Demise of John Lullabye mix)"	Digital remix of material from the Evergreen EP.
2020	"Isolation 2020"	Home-recorded version of the song "Isolation", produced during the COVID-19 pandemic.
2021	"Jump In"	Released on the various-artists flexi-disc EP X-Ray Flex and later included on Same Sun / Same Sky.
2021	"Low"	Cover of R.E.M.'s "Low", released as track 37 of A Carnival of Sorts: An R.E.M. Covers Compilation on 20 August 2021.
