= Boys Will Be Boys (The Ordinary Boys song) =

2005 single by the Ordinary Boys

Single by the Ordinary Boys

from the album Brassbound
- Released: 6 June 2005
- Length: 2:43
- Label: B-Unique
- Songwriters: William J. Brown; James Gregory; Samuel Preston
- Producer: Stephen Street

The Ordinary Boys singles chronology
"Seaside" (2004)	"Boys Will Be Boys" (2005)	"Life Will Be the Death of Me" (2005)

"Boys Will Be Boys" is a single by British rock group the Ordinary Boys. It was released in 2005, when it reached number 16 in the UK Singles Chart, but it re-entered the chart in January 2006 following singer Samuel Preston's appearance on Celebrity Big Brother, reaching number three on the UK Singles Chart and number 22 on the Irish Singles Chart. The toasted verse towards the end of the song is performed by Ranking Junior, the son of Ranking Roger of 2-Tone group the Beat.

== Track listings ==
7-inch

1. "Boys Will Be Boys"
2. "The KKK Took My Baby Away"

CD1

1. "Boys Will Be Boys"
2. "We Soldier On"

CD2

1. "Boys Will Be Boys"
2. "Quarter Life Crisis"
3. "Boys Will Be Boys" (Lady Sovereign Remix)
4. "Boys Will Be Boys" (Video)

== Charts ==
=== Weekly charts ===
Chart (2005)	Peak position
Scottish Singles Sales (Official Charts)	17
UK Singles (Official Charts)	16

Chart (2006)	Peak position
Europe (Eurochart Hot 100)	12
Ireland (IRMA)	22
Scottish Singles Sales (Official Charts)	2
UK Singles (Official Charts)	3

=== Year-end charts ===
Chart (2006)	Position
UK Singles (OCC)	49

== Certifications ==
Region	Certification	Certified units/sales
United Kingdom (BPI)	Silver	200,000^{‡}
^{‡} Sales+streaming figures based on certification alone.

== In other media ==
In the film Van Wilder: The Rise of Taj the song is used in the intro. In the film The Best Man, the song is part of the soundtrack, and it can be heard during a scene on a train of the London Underground "The Tube" (at min. 28:32).

The song was also covered in a 'Oompa-ska' style by Goldfrapp for BBC Radio 1's Live Lounge on 27 April 2006. It was subsequently released by Goldfrapp on their single "Satin Boys, Flaming Chic". The song was ranked at number 49 in the 100 biggest selling singles of 2006.

In the film adaptation of Harry Potter and the Order of the Phoenix, this song is heard in the Gryffindor Common Room where Seamus Finnigan argues with Harry Potter about he and Albus Dumbledore's claims of Voldemort's return. According to Rupert Grint, David Yates used it to create a more "casual" feel to the Common Room.
