= Pop Said... =

Studio album by the Darling Buds
- Released: Feb 1989
- Recorded: 1988
- Studios: The Greenhouse, London
- Genres: Indie, pop
- Length: 32:28
- Labels: Epic; Cherry Red
- Producer: Pat Collier

The Darling Buds chronology
Pop Said... (1989)	Shame on You (1990)

Singles from Pop Said...
- 1. "Shame on You" Released: March 1988; 2. "Burst" Released: September 1988; 3. "Hit the Ground" Released: December 1988; 4. "Let's Go Round There" Released: March 1989; 5. "You've Got to Choose" Released: July 1989

Pop Said... is the debut album by the Welsh band the Darling Buds, released in 1989 via Epic Records. The album charted at number 23 on the UK Albums Chart.

The album was re-released by Cherry Red Records in 2006 in an expanded 21-track edition, including B-sides and rarities from the era.

== Production ==
The songs were written by Harley Farr and Andrea Lewis. The recording sessions for Pop Said... began at Greenhouse Studios in early 1988, with Pat Collier producing.

== Critical reception ==
Professional ratings
Review scores
Source	Rating
AllMusic	3.5/5 stars
The Encyclopedia of Popular Music	3/5 stars
MusicHound Rock: The Essential Album Guide	4/5 stars
Record Mirror	3/5 stars
The Rolling Stone Album Guide	3.5/5 stars

Trouser Press called the album "a dozen upbeat songs about love (of the puppy, crummy and lost varieties), all well sung and solidly played," writing that "repeated listenings may cause a sugar rush." The Boston Globe wrote that "each of the dozen tunes here is crafted like a classic pop single: killer hooks, race-and-roar guitar lines, telling catchphrases, girl-boy conflicts and emotional kicks." The Jerusalem Post deemed the album "replete with consummate pop songs." The New York Times wrote that "as the guitars surge and the catchy choruses pile up, the Darling Buds supply unrepentant pop pleasure."

== Track listing ==
=== Original ===
All songs written by Harley Farr and Andrea Lewis

1. "Hit the Ground" (2:19)
2. "Burst" (2:51)
3. "Uptight" (2:48)
4. "The Other Night" (2:22)
5. "Big Head" (2:24)
6. "Let's Go Round There" (3:26)
7. "She's Not Crying" (2:07)
8. "Shame on You" (2:01)
9. "You've Got to Choose" (2:17)
10. "Spin" (2:41)
11. "When It Feels Good" (3:44)
12. "Things We Do for Love" (3:18)

=== 2006 re-release bonus tracks ===
1. "Just Say So" (3:11)
2. "Pretty Girl" (2:43)
3. "If I Said" (3:19)
4. "Turn You On" (2:55)
5. "Different Daze" (4:01)
6. "Mary's Got to Go" (2:02)
7. "I'll Never Stop" (3:25)
8. "Shame on You – Slightlydelic Version" (4:35)
9. "It's All Up to You – Flip Flop Version" (2:21)

== Credits ==
- Andrea Lewis – vocals
- Geraint "Harley" Farr – guitar
- Chris McDonagh – bass
- Richard Gray "Bloss" – drums

== Charts ==
Chart	Peak position
Australian Albums (ARIA)	139
UK Albums (OCC)	23
