= Preston (singer) =

English singer (born 1982)

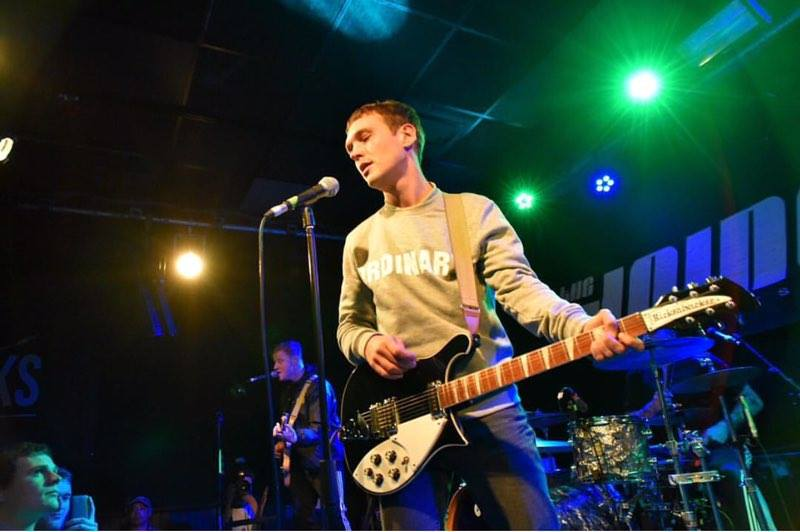
- Preston performing in 2015

Background information
- Also known as: Preston
- Born: Samuel Dylan Murray Preston; 16 January 1982 (age 44); Worthing, West Sussex, England
- Genres: Pop; Britpop; indie rock; punk; ska; dance-rock
- Occupations: Singer; songwriter
- Instruments: Vocals; guitar; banjo; keyboard; kazoo
- Years active: 2002–present
- Labels: B-Unique; Hellcat
- Member of: The Ordinary Boys; The Family Business Ltd.
- Spouse: Chantelle Houghton (m. 2006; div. 2007)

Samuel Dylan Murray Preston (born 16 January 1982), more commonly known simply as Preston, is an English singer-songwriter and reality TV contestant. He is a member of the band the Ordinary Boys, finding fame appearing in the reality television show Celebrity Big Brother in 2006, in which he finished fourth. After the Ordinary Boys split in 2008, he embarked on a songwriting career. In 2013, he officially reunited the Ordinary Boys and in 2015 they released their self-titled comeback album, which peaked at #27 in the charts, spending 1 week on the chart.

== Early life ==
Samuel Preston was born in Worthing, West Sussex. He was educated at Sompting Abbotts Preparatory School and Bishop Luffa School in Chichester. He is the son of a British father Anthony and American mother Miranda Preston (née Hynes), who is originally from Philadelphia, and brother to Alex and Lucy Preston. His grandfather was the Princeton University English professor Samuel Hynes. His brother, Alex Preston, is a novelist. At age 16, Preston was kicked out of his family home and in his teenage years, he lived in Philadelphia with his mother's side of the family.

== Music career ==
Preston became the lead singer of Worthing-based pop group, the Ordinary Boys. They had several top-ten releases in the UK Singles Chart. Their best known song, "Boys Will Be Boys", is featured in the 2007 film Harry Potter and the Order of the Phoenix.

After the Ordinary Boys split, Preston started working on material for a solo album, and released the song "Dressed to Kill", on 5 July 2009 as part of T4. The song samples the introduction from the song "Happy House" by Siouxsie and the Banshees. The single was released on 7 September 2009 but failed to chart after Preston had to delay the launch and pull out of promotional performances after breaking both arms in a bicycle accident while inebriated.

He is also a songwriter. In 2011, Preston co-wrote the number one Olly Murs song "Heart Skips a Beat", originally penned for his abandoned solo album. Preston announced the re-forming of the Ordinary Boys in 2011, and a new 12-date tour. Preston also co wrote the song and duet "Beautiful" by Enrique Iglesias and Kylie Minogue for their respective albums, and his track "Dressed to Kill" was re-recorded by American singer Cher for her album Closer to the Truth. Other notable acts Preston has written for include Liam Payne, Jessie Ware, Sum 41 and Tomorrow X Together.

== TV appearances ==
In January 2006, Preston appeared on Channel 4's fourth series of Celebrity Big Brother. During his time in the house he became close to the eventual winner, Chantelle Houghton. Preston was evicted during the final episode on 27 January 2006, finishing in fourth place.

In 2007, Preston filmed a documentary on voodoo for Channel 4. He has also presented Top of the Pops and CD:UK.

In January 2007, Preston appeared as a guest panellist on comedy gameshow Never Mind the Buzzcocks (Series 20, Episode 3). He walked out of the studio during the programme's recording, offended by jokes made at his wife's expense by the show's host Simon Amstell, who read extracts from her autobiography. In an interview with NME after the incident, he claimed that Simon Amstell didn't write his own jokes, and called him a "snotty little posh boy". He later regretted this, reflecting to the BBC "I'm struggling to think why I would have acted so weird." Speaking of Amstell, Preston said he is "funny, charming and likeable, which made it [walking off] all the more embarrassing". However, speaking about the incident in a 2026 interview, he described it as "a proud moment... I really don’t know what other choice I had", mentioning that Houghton was in the audience at the time and accusing Amstell of being "cruel and classist".

On 24 August 2010, he returned to the Big Brother franchise for Ultimate Big Brother, along with his now ex-wife Chantelle; he finished sixth.

In 2016 he appeared on Channel 4's First Dates, where he was showcased in an awkward date during his quest for romance. The date was unsuccessful, his date appearing unimpressed with his obsession with celebrity.

== Personal life ==
A week after the end of Celebrity Big Brother, Preston proposed to his longtime French girlfriend Camille Aznar. He kept in contact with fellow contestant Chantelle Houghton and, a month later, broke up with Aznar and arranged for Houghton to relocate to his Brighton flat.

He and Houghton got engaged on 11 April 2006, four months after leaving the Big Brother house. In an exclusive deal with OK! magazine, earning them £300,000 each, they were married on 25 August 2006 at Dartmouth House in Mayfair, London. After their honeymoon, Preston moved Houghton into his flat in Brighton, East Sussex. After 10 months of marriage, Preston and Houghton announced their separation on 27 June 2007. Houghton received the decree nisi for their divorce on 21 November 2007 on the grounds of Preston's "unreasonable behaviour".

In 2017, he was hospitalised following a drunken fall from a balcony while on holiday in Denmark. Doctors initially told him he would be unable to walk again: although he subsequently recovered after spending six months confined to a wheelchair, he became addicted to the opioid OxyContin for a year, overcoming this cold turkey. He later wrote the song "Live Forever" about the accident, which was recorded by Liam Payne - who himself would later die by falling from a balcony - on 16th October 2024. Preston has been open about his addiction to both alcohol and sleeping pills. As of 2018, Preston was engaged to Emily Smith.

He has lived in Los Angeles since 2023.

== Discography ==
=== Albums ===
Year	Title	Chart Position
2009	Whatever Forever: Released: (Album Shelved); Label: B-Unique	N/A

=== Singles ===
Year	Title	Peak chart positions	Album
Year	Title	UK	Album
2009	"Dressed to Kill"	N/A	Whatever Forever

== Songwriting discography ==
- "Don't Say Goodbye" by Olly Murs (2010)
- "Heart Skips a Beat" by Olly Murs (2011)
- "On My Cloud" by Olly Murs (2011)
- "Hard to Love Somebody" by Nas feat. Arlissa (2012)
- "Dressed to Kill" by Cher (2013)
- "Lighthouse" by Lucy Spraggan (2013)
- "Goodnight Goodbye" by John Newman (2013)
- "Beautiful" by Enrique Iglesias feat. Kylie Minogue (2014)
- "Million Words" by The Vamps (2015)
- "The Reason" by Lower Than Atlantis (2015)
- "Chewing Gum" by Nina Nesbitt (2016)
- "Casual" by Alex Adair (2017)
- "Hands" by Mike Perry (2017)
- "Karma" by Tom Walker (2017)
- "Personal" by The Vamps (2017)
- "Slow Me Down" by Jessie Ware (2017)
- "Starting From Now" by Catherine McGrath (2017)
- "Technology" by Don Broco (2017)
- "What Do I Do" by Sjur (2017)
- "Heartbeats" by Matoma feat. Nina Nesbitt (2018)
- "Please" by Samantha Harvey (2018)
- "Put It on for Me" by Don Diablo feat. Nina Nesbitt (2018)
- "Ruins" by Claire Richards (2018)
- "Slow" by Liam Payne (2018)
- "All I Want (For Christmas)" by Liam Payne (2019)
- "All You Need to Know" by Gryffin feat. Calle Lehmann (2019)
- "Is It Really Me You're Missing?" by Nina Nesbitt (2019)
- "Live Forever" by Liam Payne feat Cheat Codes (2019)
- "Told You So" by Hrvy (2019)
- "Dopamine" by Sum 41 (2023)
- "Higher than Heaven" by Tomorrow X Together (2024)
