= Erotica (The Darling Buds album) =

1992 studio album by the Darling Buds

Studio album by the Darling Buds
- Released: 14 September 1992
- Studios: Surrey Sound, Leatherhead
- Genres: Indie; shoegazing
- Length: 44:38
- Label: Epic
- Producer: Stephen Street

The Darling Buds chronology
Crawdaddy (1990)	Erotica (1992)	Same Sun / Same Sky (2026)

Singles from Erotica
- 1. "Sure Thing" Released: 1992; 2. "Please Yourself" Released: 1992; 3. "Long Day in the Universe" Released: 1992

Erotica is the third studio album by Welsh alternative rock band the Darling Buds, released in 1992 by Epic Records. Billboard reported that the title followed the band's 1991 UK EP Erotica Plays and noted the visual similarity between the Darling Buds' cover and Madonna's album cover. The magazine reported that the Darling Buds' album had reached US stores before Madonna's album.

== Critical reception ==
Professional ratings
Review scores
Source	Rating
AllMusic	4/5 stars
Robert Christgau	(neither)

Trouser Press wrote: "Lewis comes into her own on the aptly named Erotica (also made with producer Street), on which a fine band matures in sound yet still capitalizes on its original strength—namely, brilliant hookcraft."

== Track listing ==
All songs written by Andrea Lewis and Harley Farr, except where noted.

1. "One Thing Leads to Another" (Lewis, McDonagh) – 5:21
2. "Sure Thing" (Farr, McDonagh, Paul Watkins) – 3:24
3. "Off My Mind" – 5:17
4. "Gently Fall" – 5:37
5. "Please Yourself" (Lewis, Farr, McDonagh, Jo Callis) – 3:55
6. "Angels Fallen" (Farr, McDonagh, Watkins) – 4:47
7. "Isolation" (Lewis, McDonagh) – 4:08
8. "Long Day in the Universe" (Lewis, Farr, McDonagh, Watkins) – 4:12
9. "Wave" – 4:20
10. "If" – 3:37

== Singles ==
1. Sure Thing (1992)
2. Please Yourself (1992)
3. Long Day in the Universe (1992)

The album was released in the United States on 6 October 1992. "Please Yourself" appeared at number 25 on Billboard's Modern Rock Tracks chart on 24 October 1992 and at number 22 on 7 November. A contemporary Chaos advertisement described it as the album's first single and video.

== Members ==
- Andrea Lewis – vocals
- Geraint "Harley" Farr – guitar
- Chris McDonagh – bass
- Jimmy Hughes – drums
