= Crawdaddy (album) =

Studio album by the Darling Buds
- Released: 1 October 1990
- Studios: Justice Room; Great Linford Manor; Maison Rouge; Surrey Sound, Leatherhead
- Genres: Pop punk, pop, rock
- Length: 42:13
- Label: Epic 4670122
- Producer: Stephen Street

The Darling Buds chronology
Shame on You (The Native Years) (1990)	Crawdaddy (1990)	Erotica (1992)

Singles from Crawdaddy
- 1. "Tiny Machine" Released: 1990; 2. "Crystal Clear" Released: 1990; 3. "It Makes No Difference" Released: 1990

Crawdaddy is the second studio album by Welsh band the Darling Buds. It was released on Epic Records in 1990 and contains the singles "Tiny Machine" and "Crystal Clear". The band supported the album by touring with Wire Train.

== Production ==
The album was produced by Stephen Street. According to the liner notes for the 2023 box set Killing for Love, Jimmy Hughes replaced Richard Gray on drums; recording began at Justice Room, continued at Great Linford Manor and Maison Rouge, and was completed at Surrey Sound. Lewis later said that Street encouraged the band to experiment and helped distinguish the album from its debut.

== Critical reception ==
Professional ratings
Review scores
Source	Rating
AllMusic	3/5 stars
Entertainment Weekly	B+

Mark Jenkins of The Washington Post considered Crawdaddy less successful than the band's debut, but described its dance-rock and neo-psychedelic production as listenable and singled out "Crystal Clear". Trouser Press wrote: "Some now-tired Blondie-isms remain, but this fine sophomore effort is mostly a forward-looking, groove-heavy delight." The Tampa Bay Times deemed Crawdaddy "full of swirly, danceable melodies and infectious drumbeats." The Record labeled Crawdaddy "an enticing mix of melodic pop enhanced with a hint of hard-driving guitar rock."

Spin called the album "guitar-driven girl pop at its very finest." The Boston Globe considered it "a terse pop-punk manifesto that conveys love's conflicting impulses in an ingratiating, semi-complex, pop context." The Los Angeles Times wrote that the Darling Buds "thicken the pop with dense, twisted textures, lending [the album] an off-center quality."

== Track listing ==
All songs written by Harley Farr and Andrea Lewis

1. "It Makes No Difference" (3:55)
2. "Tiny Machine" (5:45)
3. "Crystal Clear" (3:48)
4. "Do You Have to Break My Heart" (3:18)
5. "You Won't Make Me Die" (3:45)
6. "Fall" (3:56)
7. "A Little Bit of Heaven" (3:46)
8. "Honeysuckle" (2:39)
9. "So Close" (5:29)
10. "The End of the Beginning" (3:33)

== Charts ==
Chart (1990–1991)	Peak position
Australian Albums (ARIA)	166
