= The Ordinary Boys =

English indie rock band

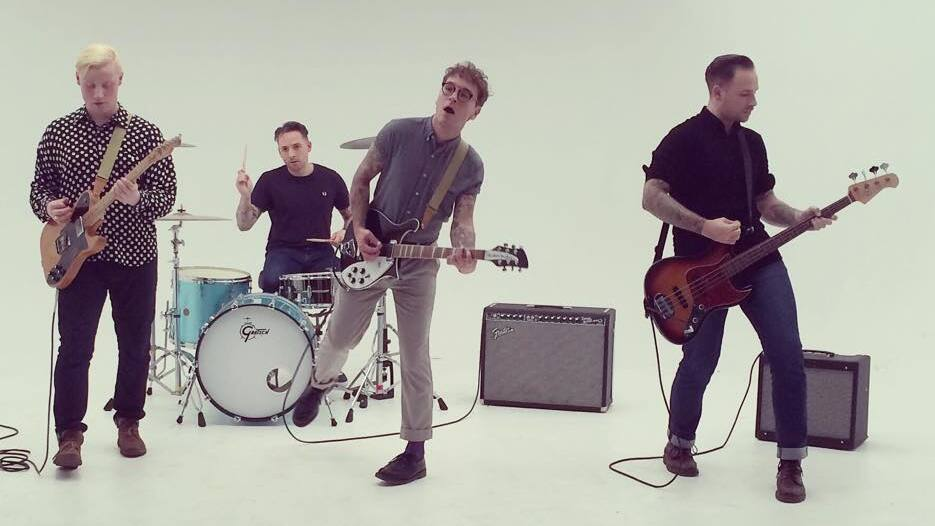
- The Ordinary Boys in 2015

Background information
- Origin: Worthing, England
- Genres: Indie rock; punk rock; ska; 2 tone
- Years active: 2002–2008; 2011–present
- Labels: MCA Music, Inc.; B-Unique
- Members: Samuel Preston; Charlie Stanley; James Gregory; Matthew Powers
- Past members: William J. Brown; Dane Etteridge; Toby Horton; Dan Logan; Alex Kershaw; Simon Goldring; Andy Massey

The Ordinary Boys are an English indie rock band from Worthing, West Sussex. Originally named Next in Line, they are influenced by punk rock and Britpop music. Their name derives from a Morrissey song, "The Ordinary Boys". The membership of the band that originally split up in 2008 consisted of founding members Preston (vocals, rhythm guitar), William Brown (lead guitar), James Gregory (bass), and Simon Goldring (drums). In October 2015, they returned with a new self-titled album on their own imprint label Treat Yourself. A 25-date UK tour from mid-October 2015 to mid-November 2015 to promote the album followed.

== Career ==
=== 2004–2007: Debut and commercial success ===
In 2004, the Ordinary Boys released their debut album Over the Counter Culture preceded by the single "Maybe Someday". The title track "Over the Counter Culture" was featured on the soundtrack for the video game Burnout 3: Takedown. In support of the album, they embarked on a tour supported by the Kaiser Chiefs.

In 2005, they released their second album Brassbound along with the single "Boys Will Be Boys". The single resurfaced the following year, when the band's awareness grew while Preston participated in Celebrity Big Brother UK. It was made clear that Preston's bandmates were not happy about his search for fame. However, during this time, "Boys Will Be Boys" was re-released and reached No. 3 on the UK Singles Chart and No. 1 on the UK Download Chart. That year, Simon Goldring replaced original drummer Charlie Stanley.

Following this, they released singles "Nine2Five" and "Lonely at the Top" to further top 10 success. In October 2006, they released their third album, How to Get Everything You Ever Wanted in Ten Easy Steps, which marked a change of sound, with more of a commercial pop feel, featuring synthesisers and samples. "I Luv U" was released as the final single from the album and became their fourth consecutive top 10 hit.

The song "Boys Will Be Boys" featured in Harry Potter and the Order of the Phoenix. The band was also referenced in the episode "Smoke and Mirrors" from the second series of The IT Crowd.

The group toured Japan and supported acts such as Morrissey, Paul Weller and The Who. They appeared on Later... with Jools Holland and one of the last episodes of Top of the Pops.

=== 2008–2014: Split and reunions ===
In early 2008, Preston confirmed the band's split through the Ordinary Boys website. The Ordinary Boys' final live performance was at the Ben and Jerry's Summer Sundae outdoor event on Clapham Common on 27 July 2008. Preston's announcement stated that he was writing new material for a solo album, and he went on to have a career as a songwriter for artists such as Olly Murs, Kylie Minogue and Enrique Iglesias, John Newman, Lucy Spraggan, and James Flannigan.

A revived Ordinary Boys reunited in December 2011 for a full UK tour of small venues. Preston stated that his objective had been "to give this band the decent burial that they didn't get in 2008". Brown and Gregory were unavailable for the reunion for personal differences. The band recruited three new members to perform with Preston and Goldring, and this line-up recorded the new song "Run This Town". which was performed on the tour. Gregory made a guest appearance at the Islington Academy show on the tour, playing on "Maybe Someday".

The Ordinary Boys reunited on 13 December 2013 to play a one-off gig at the Hoxton Bar and Grill in Shoreditch, London. This reunion featured the return of Gregory on bass, and featured Alex Kershaw of Exeter band the Computers on guitar in place of the previous reunion members. On 28 December 2013, Preston announced that the Ordinary Boys were to officially reform, this time with Louis Jones from Spectrals on lead guitar, with original drummer Charlie Stanley replacing Goldring. On 19 August 2014, the Ordinary Boys new lineup played a sold-out first show at Birthdays in Dalston as a warm up for their UK tour that November.

=== 2015–present: Later albums and singles ===
In July 2015, the band announced that they would release their fourth album, the eponymously titled The Ordinary Boys, on 2 October 2015 via their own imprint label, Treat Yourself. A single, "Four Letter Word", was released in July on 7-inch vinyl and CD single and they also issued "I'm Leaving You (and I'm Taking You With Me)" on a split 7-inch with American band Mixtapes. The album peaked at #27 in the charts, spending a total of 1 week on the chart.

In March 2021, The Ordinary Boys teamed up with Mini Murphy to record a tribute to Murphy's father, Ranking Roger, who had died on 26 March 2019. The resulting double-A side single, with "Legacy" on one side and "Jump and Skank" on the other, was released as a download, vinyl and CD single by United Sound Records/Proper.

On 1 December 2025, "Christmas Starts Tonight" was released as a collaborative single between The Ordinary Boys and singer Olly Murs; the song was written by Preston and started as the demo for eventual Murs single "Run This Town", which was released in October 2025. "Christmas Starts Tonight" debuted at number 82 on the UK Singles Downloads Chart. In April 2026 the Ordinary Boys released a new single, "Peer Pressure", and played their first live show in a decade.

== Discography ==
=== Albums ===
Title	Details	Peak chart positions			Certifications
Title	Details	UK	UK Indie	SCO	Certifications
Over the Counter Culture	Released: 5 August 2004; Label: B-Unique/Warner Music	19	—	18	BPI: Silver
Brassbound	Released: 20 June 2005; Label: B-Unique/Warner Music	11	—	14	BPI: Gold
How to Get Everything You Ever Wanted in Ten Easy Steps	Released: 23 October 2006; Label: B-Unique/Polydor	15	—	22	BPI: Silver
The Ordinary Boys	Released: 2 October 2015; Label: Treat Yourself Records	—	38	—	

=== Singles ===
Year	Title	Peak chart positions					Album
Year	Title	UK	UK Down.	EU Digital Tracks	IRE	SCO	Album
2004	"Maybe Someday"	—	—	—	—	—	Over the Counter Culture
2004	"Week In, Week Out"	36	—	—	—	36	Over the Counter Culture
2004	"Talk, Talk, Talk"	17	—	—	—	24	Over the Counter Culture
2004	"Seaside"	27	—	—	—	30	Over the Counter Culture
2005	"Boys Will Be Boys"	3	1	1	22	2	Brassbound
2005	"Life Will Be the Death of Me"	50	—	—	—	50	Brassbound
2006	"Nine2Five" (vs. Lady Sovereign)	6	12	11	25	6	How to Get Everything You Ever Wanted in Ten Easy Steps
2006	"Lonely at the Top"	10	26	—	—	19	How to Get Everything You Ever Wanted in Ten Easy Steps
2007	"I Luv U"	7	5	8	—	12	How to Get Everything You Ever Wanted in Ten Easy Steps
2014	"Awkward"	—	—	—	—	—	The Ordinary Boys
2015	"Four Letter Word"	—	—	—	—	—	The Ordinary Boys
2025	"Christmas Starts Tonight" (with Olly Murs)	—	82	—	—	—	Non-album single
2026	"Peer Pressure"	—	—		—	—	Non-album single
