= The Cranberries discography =

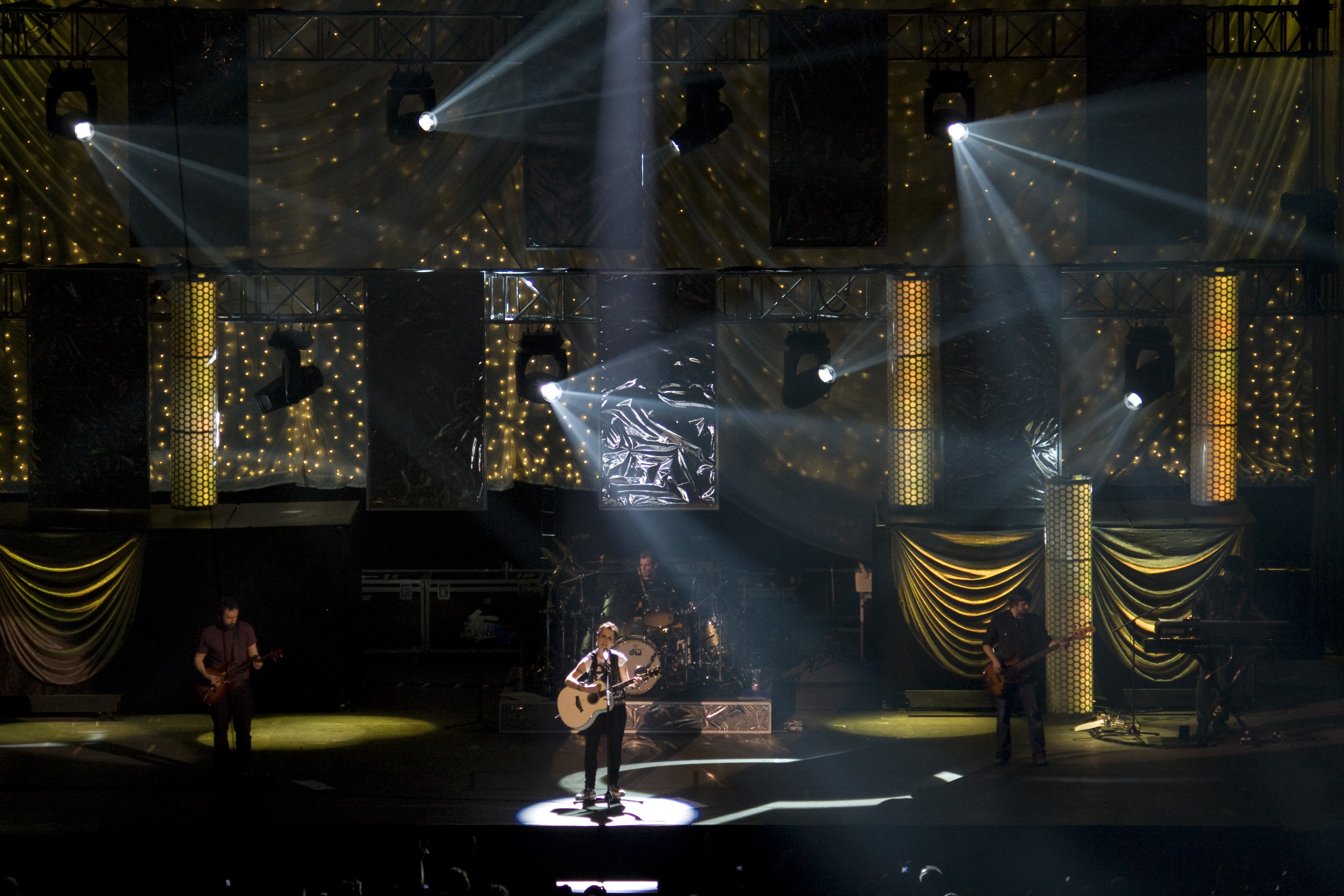
- The Cranberries performing in Barcelona in March 2010
- Studio albums: 8
- Extended plays: 8
- Live albums: 4
- Compilation albums: 7
- Singles: 23
- Video albums: 8
- Music videos: 21
- Promotional singles: 12

The Cranberries are an Irish rock band formed in Limerick in 1989, originally under the name The Cranberry Saw Us. Although widely associated with alternative rock, the band's sound incorporates post-punk and rock elements. Since their formation, the Cranberries have had eight studio albums, eight extended plays, 23 singles (including two re-releases), three live albums, seven compilation albums, eight video albums, and 21 music videos released.

The Cranberries rose to fame with their debut album, Everybody Else Is Doing It, So Why Can't We?, which became a commercial success and was certified Platinum in Australia, 2× platinum in Britain, and 5× platinum in the US. Their next studio album, No Need to Argue, gave them the hit single "Zombie" and was their best-selling studio album. The band has achieved one number-one album on the UK Albums Chart (Everybody Else Is Doing It, So Why Can't We?) and two number-one singles on the Modern Rock Tracks chart ("Zombie" and "Salvation"). The album Roses was released on 27 February 2012. Their next record, Something Else, covering earlier songs together with the Irish Chamber Orchestra, was released on 28 April 2017. Their eighth and final studio album, In The End, was released on 26 April 2019.

The group covered "(They Long to Be) Close to You" on the 1994 tribute album If I Were a Carpenter.

== Albums ==
=== Studio albums ===
| Title | Album details | Peak chart positions | | | | | | | | | | Sales | Certifications |
| Title | Album details | IRL | AUS | AUT | CAN | FRA | GER | NZ | SWI | UK | US | Sales | Certifications |
|---|---|---|---|---|---|---|---|---|---|---|---|---|---|
| Everybody Else Is Doing It, So Why Can't We? | Released: 1 March 1993; Label: Island; Formats: CD, cassette, vinyl | 1 | 16 | — | 19 | 10 | 18 | 9 | — | 1 | 18 | US: 3,200,000 | ARIA: Platinum; BPI: 2× Platinum; MC: Platinum; RIAA: 5× Platinum; RMNZ: Platinum; SNEP: Gold |
| No Need to Argue | Released: 3 October 1994; Label: Island; Formats: CD, cassette, vinyl | 2 | 1 | 1 | 1 | 1 | 1 | 1 | 2 | 2 | 6 | US: 4,100,000 | ARIA: 5× Platinum; BPI: 3× Platinum; BVMI: Platinum; IFPI AUT: Platinum; IFPI SWI: Platinum; MC: 5× Platinum; RIAA: 7× Platinum; RMNZ: Platinum; SNEP: Diamond |
| To the Faithful Departed | Released: 29 April 1996; Label: Island; Formats: CD, cassette, vinyl | 2 | 1 | 5 | 2 | 5 | 2 | 1 | 3 | 2 | 4 | US: 1,700,000 | ARIA: 2× Platinum; BPI: Gold; BVMI: Gold; IFPI AUT: Gold; IFPI SWI: Gold; MC: 3× Platinum; RIAA: 2× Platinum; RMNZ: Platinum; SNEP: Platinum |
| Bury the Hatchet | Released: 19 April 1999; Label: Island; Formats: CD, cassette, vinyl | 4 | 11 | 2 | 1 | 2 | 1 | 6 | 1 | 7 | 13 | US: 377,000 | BPI: Silver; BVMI: Gold; IFPI AUT: Gold; IFPI SWI: Platinum; MC: Platinum; RIAA: Gold; SNEP: Platinum |
| Wake Up and Smell the Coffee | Released: 22 October 2001; Label: MCA; Formats: CD, vinyl | 9 | 85 | 17 | 8 | 2 | 7 | — | 6 | 61 | 46 | US: 170,000 | IFPI SWI: Gold; MC: Gold; SNEP: 2× Gold |
| Roses | Released: 27 February 2012; Label: Cooking Vinyl; Formats: CD, vinyl, digital | 17 | — | 28 | 6 | 5 | 13 | 38 | 10 | 37 | 51 | | |
| Something Else | Released: 28 April 2017; Label: BMG; Formats: CD, vinyl, digital | 18 | — | — | 96 | 27 | 60 | — | 43 | 18 | — | | |
| In the End | Release date: 26 April 2019; Label: BMG; Formats: CD, vinyl, digital | 3 | 28 | 16 | 34 | 11 | 8 | — | 5 | 10 | 119 | | |
"—" denotes items that did not chart or were not released in that territory.

=== Compilation albums ===
| Title | Album details | Peak chart positions | | | | | | | | | | Certifications |
| Title | Album details | IRL | AUS | AUT | BEL | GER | ITA | NLD | NZ | SWI | UK | Certifications |
|---|---|---|---|---|---|---|---|---|---|---|---|---|
| The Treasure Box | Released: 2 April 2002; Label: Island; Formats: CD, vinyl | — | — | — | — | — | — | — | — | — | — | |
| Stars: The Best of 1992–2002 | Released: 16 September 2002; Label: Island; Formats: CD, vinyl | 4 | 8 | 16 | 3 | 23 | 3 | 31 | 13 | 4 | 16 | ARIA: Gold; BPI: Platinum; BVMI: Gold; FIMI: Gold; IFPI SWI: Gold; RMNZ: Platinum |
| 20th Century Masters – The Millennium Collection: The Best of The Cranberries | Released: 27 September 2005; Label: Island; Formats: CD | — | — | — | — | — | — | — | — | — | — | |
| Gold | Released: 11 March 2008; Label: Island; Formats: CD | — | 40 | — | — | — | — | — | — | — | — | |
| Icon: The Cranberries | Released: 31 August 2010; Label: Island; Formats: CD | — | — | — | — | — | — | — | 26 | — | — | |
| Dreams – The Collection | Released: 21 February 2013; Label: Spectrum; Formats: CD | 3 | — | — | 173 | — | — | — | — | — | 44 | BPI: Gold |
| Remembering Dolores | Released: September 2021; Label: Island; Formats: LP, digital | — | — | — | — | — | — | — | — | — | — | |
"—" denotes items that did not chart or were not released in that territory.

=== Live albums ===
| Title | Album details | Peak chart positions | | | | |
| Title | Album details | AUT | GER | GRE | MEX | SWI |
|---|---|---|---|---|---|---|
| Bualadh Bos – The Cranberries Live | Released: 10 November 2009; Label: Island; Formats: CD | — | — | 29 | 99 | — |
| Live 2010 | Released: 27 September 2011; Label: 4worlds Media; Formats: CD | — | — | — | — | — |
| London 2012: Live at The Hammersmith Apollo | Released: 5 March 2013; Label: Concert Live; Formats: CD | — | — | — | — | — |
| MTV Unplugged | Released: 7 November 2025; Label: Island; Formats: CD, LP, digital; Note: Recorded in 1995 | 10 | 22 | — | — | 23 |
"—" denotes items that did not chart or were not released in that territory.

== EPs ==
| Title | Extended play details |
|---|---|
| Anything (as the Cranberry Saw Us) | Released: January 1990; Label: Self-released; Formats: Cassette (demo) |
| Water Circle (as the Cranberry Saw Us) | Released: August 1990; Label: Xeric; Formats: Cassette (demo) |
| Nothing Left at All (as the Cranberry Saw Us) | Released: 1990; Label: Xeric; Formats: Cassette (demo) |
| Uncertain | Released: 28 October 1991; Label: Xeric; Formats: CD, vinyl; UK No. 118 |
| Zombie Live | Released: 1994; Label: Island; Formats: CD (promo) |
| Doors and Windows | Released: 1995; Label: Island; Formats: Rainbow CD-ROM |
| Loud and Clear | Released: 1999; Label: Island; Formats: CD (promo) |
| Wrapped Around Your Finger EP | Released: 2024; Label: UMG; Formats: Streaming/Digital Download |

== Singles ==
| Year | Title | Peak chart positions | | | | | | | | | | Certifications | Album |
| Year | Title | IRL | AUS | CAN | FRA | GER | ITA | NZ | UK | US | US Alt | Certifications | Album |
|---|---|---|---|---|---|---|---|---|---|---|---|---|---|
| 1992 | "Dreams" | 9 | 30 | 27 | — | — | 59 | 38 | 27 | 42 | 15 | BPI: 2× Platinum; FIMI: Gold; RMNZ: 3× Platinum | Everybody Else Is Doing It, So Why Can't We? |
| 1993 | "Linger" | 3 | 33 | 4 | — | — | 89 | 38 | 14 | 8 | 4 | BPI: 3× Platinum; FIMI: Gold; RIAA: Gold; RMNZ: 5× Platinum | Everybody Else Is Doing It, So Why Can't We? |
| 1994 | "Zombie" | 3 | 1 | 19 | 1 | 1 | 19 | 5 | 14 | — | 1 | ARIA: Platinum; BPI: 4× Platinum; BVMI: 3× Gold; FIMI: 2× Platinum; IFPI AUT: Gold; RMNZ: 7× Platinum | No Need to Argue |
| 1994 | "Ode to My Family" | 16 | 5 | 18 | 4 | 29 | — | 8 | 26 | — | 11 | ARIA: Gold; BPI: Silver; RMNZ: Platinum | No Need to Argue |
| 1995 | "I Can't Be with You" | 21 | 30 | — | 24 | — | — | 25 | 23 | — | — | | No Need to Argue |
| 1995 | "Ridiculous Thoughts" | 23 | 60 | — | — | — | — | 43 | 20 | — | 14 | | No Need to Argue |
| 1996 | "Salvation" | 8 | 8 | 30 | 13 | 44 | 5 | 7 | 13 | — | 1 | | To the Faithful Departed |
| 1996 | "Free to Decide" | 28 | 43 | 2 | 43 | 94 | — | 19 | 33 | 22 | 8 | | To the Faithful Departed |
| 1996 | "When You're Gone" | 21 | 40 | 15 | 26 | 94 | — | 23 | — | 22 | — | RMNZ: Gold | To the Faithful Departed |
| 1997 | "Hollywood" | — | — | — | — | — | — | — | — | — | — | | To the Faithful Departed |
| 1999 | "Promises" | 19 | 78 | — | 32 | 45 | 4 | 20 | 13 | — | 12 | | Bury the Hatchet |
| 1999 | "Animal Instinct" | — | — | — | 55 | 72 | 34 | — | 54 | — | — | | Bury the Hatchet |
| 1999 | "Just My Imagination" | — | — | — | 71 | 77 | 15 | — | — | — | — | FIMI: Gold | Bury the Hatchet |
| 2000 | "You and Me" | — | — | — | — | — | — | — | — | — | — | | Bury the Hatchet |
| 2001 | "Analyse" | 28 | — | — | 57 | — | 6 | — | 89 | — | — | | Wake Up and Smell the Coffee |
| 2002 | "Time Is Ticking Out" | — | — | — | — | — | 23 | — | — | — | — | | Wake Up and Smell the Coffee |
| 2002 | "This Is the Day" | — | — | — | — | — | 43 | — | — | — | — | | Wake Up and Smell the Coffee |
| 2002 | "Stars" | — | — | — | — | — | 35 | — | — | — | — | | Stars: The Best of 1992–2002 |
| 2011 | "Tomorrow" | — | — | — | — | — | — | — | — | — | — | | Roses |
| 2017 | "Why" | — | — | — | — | — | — | — | — | — | — | | Something Else |
| 2017 | "Linger" (acoustic version) | — | — | — | — | — | — | — | — | — | — | | Something Else |
| 2019 | "All Over Now" | — | — | — | — | — | — | — | — | — | — | | In the End |
| 2019 | "Wake Me When It's Over" | — | — | — | — | — | — | — | — | — | — | | In the End |
"—" denotes items that did not chart or were not released in that territory.

=== Promotional singles ===
| Year | Title | Album |
|---|---|---|
| 1993 | "Sunday" (US only) | Everybody Else Is Doing It, So Why Can't We? |
| 1993 | "Still Can't..." (US only) | Everybody Else Is Doing It, So Why Can't We? |
| 1995 | "Liar" (Spain only) | Empire Records (soundtrack) |
| 1995 | "Dreaming My Dreams" (UK only) | No Need to Argue |
| 1996 | "I'm Still Remembering" (Brazil only) | To the Faithful Departed |
| 2000 | "Copycat" (Spain only) | Bury the Hatchet |
| 2012 | "Show Me" | Roses |
| 2012 | "Losing My Mind" | Roses |
| 2012 | "Raining in My Heart" | Roses |
| 2012 | "Waiting in Walthamstow" | Roses |
| 2019 | "The Pressure" | In the End |
| 2019 | "In the End" | In the End |
| 2026 | "Linger (Spanish version)" (with Bratty) | Everybody Else Is Doing It, So Why Can't We? (33rd Anniversary release) |

== Videography ==
| Year | Title |
|---|---|
| 1994 | The Cranberries Live: Label: Island; Formats: VHS, LaserDisc (Image Entertainment) |
| 1995 | Doors and Windows: Label: Island; Formats: Rainbow CD-ROM |
| 2001 | Beneath the Skin – Live in Paris: Label: Image Entertainment; Formats: DVD, VHS |
| 2002 | Beneath the Skin – Live in Paris – 2: Label: Image Entertainment; Formats: DVD |
| 2002 | Stars: The Best of Videos 1992–2002: Label: Island; Formats: DVD |
| 2005 | The Cranberries Live (re-release): Label: Island; Formats: DVD |
| 2005 | 20th Century Masters Collection: The Cranberries: Label: Island; Formats: DVD |
| 2007 | Gold Collection: The Videos: Label: Universal; Formats: DVD |

=== Music videos ===
| Year | Title | Director |
|---|---|---|
| 1991 | "Uncertain" | |
| 1992 | "Dreams" (version 1) | John Maybury |
| 1993 | "Linger" | Melodie McDaniel |
| 1994 | "Dreams" (version 2) | Peter Scammell |
| 1994 | "Dreams" (version 3) | Nico Soultanakis |
| 1994 | "Zombie" | Samuel Bayer |
| 1995 | "Ode to My Family" | Samuel Bayer |
| 1995 | "I Can't Be with You" | Samuel Bayer |
| 1995 | "Ridiculous Thoughts" (version 1) | Samuel Bayer |
| 1995 | "Ridiculous Thoughts" (version 2) | Freckles Flynn |
| 1996 | "Salvation" | Olivier Dahan |
| 1996 | "Free to Decide" | Marty Callner |
| 1996 | "When You're Gone" | Karen Bellone |
| 1999 | "Promises" | Olivier Dahan |
| 1999 | "Animal Instinct" | Olivier Dahan |
| 1999 | "Just My Imagination" | Phil Harder |
| 2000 | "You & Me" | Maurice Linnane |
| 2001 | "Analyse" | Keir McFarlane |
| 2002 | "Time Is Ticking Out" | Maurice Linnane |
| 2002 | "This Is the Day" | Olivier Dahan |
| 2002 | "Stars" | Jake Nava |
| 2012 | "Tomorrow" | Colin McIvor |
| 2019 | "All Over Now" | Dan Britt |
| 2019 | "Wake Me When It's Over" | |
