= Gold (The Cranberries album) =

Greatest hits album by The Cranberries
- Released: 11 March 2008
- Recorded: 1992–2002
- Genre: Alternative rock
- Length: 122:18
- Label: Island/Mercury
- Producers: Stephen Street, Bruce Fairbairn, The Cranberries and Benedict Fenner

The Cranberries chronology
Stars: The Best of 1992–2002 (2002)	Gold (2008)	Bualadh Bos – The Cranberries Live (2009)

Professional ratings
Review scores
Source	Rating
AllMusic	4/5 stars

Gold is a compilation album from the Irish band The Cranberries, released as part of Universal Music's Gold series. Unlike on the preceding compilation Stars: The Best of 1992–2002, the versions of the songs present on this two-disc collection are not edited for length.

The liner notes indicate on page six that the album was originally going to feature a 16th track on disc two, taken from Dolores O'Riordan's solo album Are You Listening?.

== Track listing ==
Disc 1
No.	Title	Length
1.	"Dreams"	4:33
2.	"Sunday"	3:32
3.	"Pretty"	2:17
4.	"How"	2:53
5.	"Not Sorry"	4:21
6.	"Linger"	4:36
7.	"Liar"	2:23
8.	"Zombie"	5:08
9.	"Ode to My Family"	4:31
10.	"I Can't Be with You"	3:09
11.	"Empty"	3:28
12.	"Everything I Said"	3:53
13.	"Ridiculous Thoughts"	4:33
14.	"Dreaming My Dreams"	3:37
15.	"Daffodil Lament"	6:06
16.	"So Cold in Ireland"	4:44
Total length:		63:44

Disc 2
No.	Title	Length
1.	"Salvation"	2:24
2.	"Free to Decide"	4:25
3.	"When You're Gone"	4:57
4.	"Hollywood"	5:08
5.	"Cordell"	3:40
6.	"Animal Instinct"	3:32
7.	"Promises"	5:28
8.	"You and Me"	3:35
9.	"Just My Imagination"	3:42
10.	"Never Grow Old"	2:36
11.	"Analyse"	4:11
12.	"Time Is Ticking Out"	3:01
13.	"This Is the Day"	4:15
14.	"New New York"	4:09
15.	"Stars"	3:31
Total length:		58:34

== Charts ==
Chart (2018)	Peak position
Australian Albums (ARIA)	40
Canadian Albums (Billboard)	28
