= Yesterday's Gone =

Yesterday's Gone may refer to:

== Albums ==
- Yesterday's Gone (Chad & Jeremy album), a 1964 album
- Yesterday's Gone (Loyle Carner album), a 2017 album
- Yesterday's Gone, a 1964 album by Roy Drusky
- Yesterday's Gone, a 1975 album by New World (band)

== Songs ==
- "Yesterday's Gone" (song), a 1963 single by Chad & Jeremy
- "Yesterday's Gone", a song on the 1974 album I Came to Hear the Music by Mickey Newbury
- "Yesterday's Gone", a 1977 single by Vern Gosdin
- "Yesterday's Gone", a 1988 EP by Flash and the Pan
- "Yesterday's Gone", a song on the 1993 album Superpinkymandy by Beth Orton
- "Yesterday's Gone", a song on the 1995 album Dogs of War by Saxon
- "Yesterday's Gone", a song on the 1995 album Fear No Evil by Slaughter
- "Yesterday's Gone", an unreleased single recorded in 1995 by The Cranberries on MTV Unplugged
- "Yesterday's Gone", a song in the 1998 Mickey Newbury Collection
- "Yesterday's Gone", a song on the 2000 album Ulysses by Reeves Gabrels
- "Yesterday's Gone", a song on the 2001 album Elm St. by Ryan Cabrera
- "Yesterday's Gone", a song on the 2003 album Uprising by Jibe (band)
- "Yesterday's Gone", a song on the 2007 album Strictly Physical by Monrose
- "Yesterday's Gone", a song on the 2008 album Father Time by Hal Ketchum
- "Yesterday's Gone", a song on the 2008 album Too by Madita
- "Yesterday's Gone", a song on the 2010 album The Boxer by Kele Okereke
- "Yesterday's Gone", a song on the 2014 album Fightback Soundtrack by We Are Leo

== Television ==
- "Yesterday's Gone", a 1986 episode of the American series The New Leave It to Beaver
- "Yesterday's Gone", a 1987 episode of the American series Houston Knights
- "Yesterday's Gone", a 2014 episode of the American series Suits

== Other ==
- Yesterday's Gone, Book 6 in the graphic novel series Wet Moon by Sophie Campbell

== See also ==
- "When Yesterday's Gone", a song on the 2013 album You're a Shadow by Hungry Kids of Hungary
