= The Hitchers (band) =

Irish rock band

- Origin: City of Limerick, Ireland
- Genres: Rock, punk rock, indie rock
- Years active: 1989–present
- Labels: murgatroid, 4-3-3
- Members: Andy Gallagher (vocals, guitars); Niall Quinn (vocals, drums); Hoss Carnage (bass, vocals); Eric Fitzgerald (guitars, vocals)
- Past members: Eoin O'Kelly (Vocals 1989-91); Brendan 'Benny' McCormack (guitar 1989-90); Frank Ryan (Bass 2000-01); Donnacha Twoomey (lead guitar 1989)
- Website: thehitchers.ie

The Hitchers are a band from the Irish city of Limerick. They formed in 1989.

== History ==
The Hitchers released two LPs in the UK and Ireland: It's All Fun and Games Til Someone Loses an Eye (1997) and For the Want of Some Better TV (1999).

They are perhaps best remembered in the UK for the song "Strachan", a kitchen sink opera wherein the protagonist is involved in an argument while simultaneously watching a football match on TV that features the Scottish footballer Gordon Strachan in an early 1990s Leeds United side versus an unspecified opposition (though the studio recordings fade-out features a sample that suggests the opposition are the Birmingham club Aston Villa).

Though the single did not chart on its release in summer 1997 (it was released by a small new independent label, Murgatroid, and distributed by Vital, as a double a-side 33 rpm 7-inch vinyl b/w "You Can Only Love Someone So Much But You Can Hate Them All The Way To Hell" and as track 2 of a 4-song CD EP) it received considerable airplay from prolific UK-based DJs including John Peel, Steve Lamacq, Gideon Coe, Sean Hughes and Bob Geldof and is still occasionally heard on UK radio to the present day. It has been cited as one of the great "football songs" in the press and in online discussion/commentary.

The alternative A-side of the single, "You Can Only Love Someone So Much But You Can Hate Them All The Way To Hell", the lyrics of which consist solely of the song's title, is notable in that it was nominated in the Best Irish Single 1997 category in Ireland's Hot Press awards (won by "A Life Less Ordinary" by Ash). The song was subsequently used in the movie Rat (Universal Pictures-2000).

The Hitchers recorded a Peel Session at BBC Maida Vale 4 in July 1997. This was broadcast in November 1997 and repeated in February 1998. This session has been re-broadcast on multiple occasions since by DJs such as Gideon Coe and Chris Hawkins

While supporting The Divine Comedy at Mandela Hall, Belfast in June 1997 The Hitchers were recorded live and broadcast on the Steve Lamacq show. In 2019 Lamacq curated Lost Alternatives, a 2x12"/4xCD compilation of some of his favourite bands from his time working at the BBC. He selected Strachan to close the album.

Their 1997 Dave Fanning Session, recorded for RTÉ, was re-broadcast on the Dan Hegarty Show in 2006 as part of his "Classic Session" series.

Though The Hitchers broke up in 2001 they have performed live numerous times since in their native Ireland and released a 20th Anniversary single "Austin Cusack" in 2009.

In 2021 the band announced a crowdfunder initiative for a 25th Anniversary vinyl re-release of It's All Fun and Games Til Someone Loses an Eye. The Fundit campaign comfortably surpassed its target and the album was re-released in 2022.

In summer 2023 it was announced The Hitchers would play their first UK dates in a quarter of a century. They appeared at Wulfrun Hall, Wolverhampton supporting Half Man Half Biscuit followed by their own gig in Leeds in early October.

== The Cranberries connection ==
The Hitchers drummer Niall Quinn (b. 1973) was, perhaps somewhat unusually, the band's primary songwriter and while The Hitchers were still only a few months in existence he joined a second band as lead vocalist/guitarist as a further outlet for his song-writing. This band called themselves The Cranberry Saw Us and also featured Noel Hogan (Guitar), Mike Hogan (bass) and Fergal Lawler (drums). The Cranberry Saw Us did several gigs in Limerick between November 1989 and February 1990 and recorded a demo, called Anything, in January 1990, before Quinn quit the band stating he was unsuited to the lead vocalist/frontman role. Post-departure he recommended two other males who might be suitable replacements. After Noel Hogan mentioned to him that the band were considering trying out a female vocalist Quinn had Dolores O'Riordan recommended to him by a friend of his who attended the same school as her. Quinn obtained a phone number, contacted her and invited her to come along to a TCSU rehearsal which he also attended to help show O'Riordan what they had been playing. Thereafter O'Riordan, the Hogan brothers and Lawler began rehearsing and writing together and eventually shortened the band's name to The Cranberries.

== After The Hitchers ==
Niall Quinn has continued to write, record and perform since The Hitchers split in 2001. Returning to the lead vocalist/guitarist role for the first time since The Cranberry Saw Us his next band was called The Pennywhores (sometimes called Niall Quinn & The Pennywhores) The Pennywhores also featured Eric Fitzgerald on guitar. Two EPs Legalise Murder and Murder He Did were released through 4-3-3 in Ireland in 2004/05. An LP titled Javier Clemente is pulling off his Captain is alluded to in the sleeve notes of the Murder He Did EP but was apparently never released.

In 2009 Quinn released a new single "Rose" on CD/download under a new moniker Theme Tune Boy. The single is less than a minute in duration. This was followed in 2010 by another CD/download EP Tailrace and a third single "January Drabs" in 2011. An LP to be titled (the) Return of the Living Dead was recorded in 2011 with Dutch punk rock band Cooper performing on the bulk of the tracks. A track list was published on the Theme Tune Boy Facebook page but no release date, label or other information was given. Following a crowd-funding campaign wherein Quinn offered the front cover of the album among the rewards that could be claimed, Quinn announced on social media that Return of the Living Dead would be released on 19 January 2013. This was confirmed on the alternative music blog Louder Than War which featured an extensive review of the album.

== Discography ==
=== Albums ===
- It's All Fun & Games 'Til Someone Loses An Eye Released: by Murgatroid Independent Recording Company March 1997 Ireland, June 1997 UK Formats: CD (Mur CD02)
- For The Want Of Some Better TV Released: by Murgatroid Independent Recording Company May 1999 Ireland & UK Format: CD (Mur CD10)
- A Well Earned Break For The Firing Squads Released: by 4-3-3 December 2003, Ireland Format: CD (4-3-3CDNOREG)

=== EPs ===
- The Streaking Chicken From Mercury Who Exposed Himself To Everything – Released: July 1989 Formats/Reg: Cassette
- Fruit – Released: by Xeric Records 30 June 1990 Ireland Formats/Reg: Cassette (Xer 06)
- She'll Be Sorry – Released: by Lodge Records Nov 1994 Ireland Formats/Reg: CD (LDCDS 1005)
- Liver – Released: by 4-3-3 December 2001, Ireland Format: CD (4-3-3CD01)
- The English Stole Our Potatoes – Released: by 4-3-3 December 2006, Ireland Format: CD (4-3-3CD05)

=== Singles ===
- "Blame It On His Hormones" – Released: by Xeric Records 17 October 1990 Ireland Formats/Reg: Cassette (Xer07)
- "Holy Spirit Level" – Released: 2 March 1992 Ireland Formats/Reg: Cassette
- "Killed It With My Bare Hands" – Released: by Murgatroid Independent Recording Company Jan 1997 Ireland, April 1997 UK Formats: CD (Mur CD01) / 7-inch vinyl (Mur VINL 01)
- "You Can Only Love Someone... / Strachan" – Released: by Murgatroid Independent Recording Company June 1997 UK & Ireland Formats: CD (Mur CD03) / 7-inch vinyl (Mur VINL03)
- "Big Mug" – Released: by Murgatroid Independent Recording Company October 1997 Ireland & UK Formats: CD (Mur CD04)
- "I Can't Breath In Outer Space" – Released: by Murgatroid Independent Recording Company November 1998 Ireland & UK Formats: 7-inch vinyl (Mur VINL09)
- "Austin Cusack" – Released: by 4-3-3 December 2009, Ireland Formats: CD & download

== Press ==
- Various press clippings.
