= Doors and Windows =

Doors and Windows may refer to:

- Doors and Windows (EP), a 1995 EP by The Cranberries
- Doors and Windows (album), a 2009 album by Bearfoot
- "Buhe Baariyan" (lit. 'Doors and Windows'), a 1999 song by Hadiqa Kiani from the album Roshni, later covered by Shibani Kashyap (2021) and Kanika Kapoor (2022)
