= The Cranberries radio and television sessions =

Throughout their career, The Cranberries recorded several radio and television sessions in the form of recording studio sessions, live studio sessions, and live audience sessions.

== Recording Studio Sessions ==
=== The Dave Fanning Sessions ===
The Dave Fanning Sessions consist of recording studio sessions made available to young aspiring bands and artists. These sessions were subsequently played on The Dave Fanning Show on Irish-based radio RTÉ 2FM.

==== The 1991 Dave Fanning Session ====
Produced by Jim Lockhart and engineered by Phil Cook, the 1991 session was recorded at RTÉ's Studio 8 on March 9, 1991.
On May 19, 2010, RTÉ 2FM radio host Dan Hegarty played three tracks ("Dreams", "Uncertain", Reason") from the 1991 Dave Fanning Session, nearly 20 years after their first broadcast. Hegarty aired "Reason" again a year later on March 17, 2011, then "Dreams" on September 7, 2011 during a show broadcast from Limerick.
The complete session was broadcast again on October 18, 2011 on Dan Hegarty's show.
Track list

- "Dreams" (4:02)
- "Uncertain" (3:20)
- "Reason" (1:50)
- "Put Me Down" (2:44)

==== The 1993 Dave Fanning Session ====
In 1993, the band recorded another Fanning Session. During an interview at RTÉ 2FM, Fergal indicated that the band was recording a new version of "Wanted" from their debut album, Everybody Else Is Doing It, So Why Can't We? and three new songs ("False", "Like You Used To" and "The Icicle Melts"). Up to this date, "False" and "Like You Used To" remain commercially unreleased, while "The Icicle Melts" was re-recorded and released a year later on the band's second album, No Need to Argue. The complete session was broadcast again on 7 December 2011 on Dan Hegarty's Alternative to Sleep show (RTÉ 2FM).
Track list

- "The Icicle Melts" (3:04)
- "Wanted" (1:58)
- "Like You Used To" (2:27)
- "False" (2:22)

It is unclear if another Dave Fanning Session took place, since information about the Cranberries’ Fanning Sessions remains scarce and sometimes contradictory in the fan community. In 2002, Zombieguide webmaster, Alex Kraus, received CD-Rs from the Cranberries’ drummer, Fergal Lawler, which contained some tracks identified as being from a 1990 Dave Fanning Session. Since some of the information from those CD-Rs are now known to be inaccurate (e.g., the four 1991 Fanning Session tracks are identified as "Xeric Demos"), we cannot confirm the existence of a 1990 Dave Fanning Session. It possible that the information on those CD-R tracks was mixed up sometime between the original tape recording in the early 1990s and the CD transfer, a decade later.

=== The John Peel Session ===
The Cranberries worked on a studio session for the John Peel show on BBC Radio 1. The session, produced by Dale Griffin and engineered by Nick Gomm, was recorded at Maida Vale 4 on January 16, 1992 and broadcast a month later, on February 16. It featured four songs that were later re-recorded for the band's first album. The four tracks were broadcast again on the April 24, 1992 show. Recordings of the John Peel Session appeared on an unauthorized bootleg CD entitled Be With You.

Track list

- "Waltzing Back" (3:27)
- "Linger" (3:20)
- "Wanted" (2:05) (identified as "Want")
- "I Will Always" (2:36)

=== The BBC Radio 1 Evening Session ===
The Cranberries recorded a BBC Radio 1 Evening Session, which was broadcast on September 26, 1994. The recording session was produced by James Birtwistle. "I Can't Be With You" and "Empty" from that session were included on the "I Can't Be With You" single while "Zombie" was released on a promo cassette with British magazine Vox. It is unclear if other tracks were recorded during that session.

Track list

- "I Can't Be With You"
- "Empty"
- "Zombie"

== Live Studio Sessions ==
=== The 2 Meter Session ===
On May 23, 1993, The Cranberries recorded an acoustic performance for the 2 Meter Sessions in the Netherlands. This session was performed live without an audience.
Track list

- "Linger"
- "Wanted"
- "Away" (identified as "Turn Away")
- "Sunday"
- "I Will Always"
- "I Can't Be With You"

=== The Morning Becomes Eclectic Session ===
On the day of their Los Angeles debut, the band was invited at KCRW's Morning Becomes Eclectic radio show on July 15, 1993 for an interview with host Chris Douridas and a live acoustic performance. The acoustic version of Sunday from that performance was included on the KCRW 1995 compilation Rare on Air, volume 2. The interview and performance are available in streaming mode on the radio's website.

Track list

- "Linger"
- "False"
- "Sunday"
- "I Will Always"

=== The On The Edge Session ===
In 1993, The Cranberries recorded a live acoustic performance in Los Angeles for the On the Edge show on the Westwood One radio network. "How", "Away" and "Linger" were broadcast on the week of September 11, 1993 along with two short interview segments. The complete performance was aired during the week of June 4, 1994, without the interview segments.

Track list

- "False"
- "Away" (identified as "I Pray")
- "Linger"
- "How"

=== The 1999 BBC Radio 1 Session ===
On March 24, 1999, The Cranberries gave a three-song performance at BBC Radio 1, before the release of their fourth album Bury The Hatchet on the Mid Morning Show with Simon Mayo. It was the first time the band played "Animal Instinct" and Elvis Presley's "In The Ghetto".
Track list

- "Animal Instinct"
- "Ode to my Family"
- "In The Ghetto"

=== The Studio C Sessions ===
On August 16, 2001, The Cranberries gave a two-song acoustic performance at the Studio C of Boulder (Colorado) radio station KBCO – World Class Rock, to promote the upcoming release of Wake Up and Smell the Coffee. A similar performance was broadcast on Minneapolis-based radio station KTCZ – Cities 97 on August 20, 2001. Both performances of "Analyse" were featured on locally-sold charity compilations KBCO Studio C, Volume 13 and Cities 97 Sampler Volume 13. The two stations are part of the Clear Channel Communications group.
Track list

- Linger
- Never Grow Old (Cities 97 only)
- Analyse

=== The RTÉ 2fm Session ===
On September 6, 2002 Irish radio RTÉ 2fm broadcast a live and acoustic session with The Cranberries to promote the release of their greatest hits compilation, Stars: The Best of 1992–2002. The band discussed each song with radio host Gerry Ryan before performing it.
Track list

- "Dying in the Sun"
- "Ode to my Family"
- "Linger"
- "Free To Decide"
- "Chocolate Brown"
- "Stars"
- "Zombie"
- "Animal Instinct"

== Live audience sessions ==
=== The Black Session ===
On May 3, 1993, the band performed a live set for the C'est Lenoir show on France Inter in Paris (France). The Black Sessions were recorded in front of an audience.

Track list

- "Pretty"
- "Sunday"
- "The Icicle Melts"
- "Linger"
- "Not Sorry"
- "Waltzing Back"
- "Dreams"
- "I Can't Be With You"
- "Zombie"
- "Liar"
- "False"
- "Still Can't"

=== The WNNX Session ===
On August 19, 1994, the band recorded a live acoustic performance in front of an audience for the WNNX radio station in Atlanta, Georgia. The recording was featured on the unauthorized bootleg CD entitled Strange Fruits.

Track list

- "Sunday"
- "Zombie"
- "Wanted"
- "Linger"
- "Dreaming My Dreams"

=== The 40 Principales Acoustic Session ===
On January 31, 1995, The Cranberries recorded a live acoustic performance in front of an audience at Los 40 Principales in Madrid, Spain. Three tracks from that session (I'm Still Remembering", "Dreaming My Dreams, "Zombie") were featured on several "When You're Gone" CD singles.

Track list

- "I'm Still Remembering"
- "Dreaming My Dreams"
- "Ode to my Family"
- "Empty"
- "Zombie"

=== MTV Unplugged ===
On February 14, 1995, The Cranberries recorded a live acoustic performance in front of an audience at the Brooklyn Academy of Music in New York City for the MTV Unplugged series. During that performance with a strings ensemble (Electra Strings), the band played nine songs, from which three were unreleased material at that time. While "Free to Decide" and "I'm Still Remembering" were later included on the band's third album To the Faithful Departed, "Yesterday's Gone" remains unreleased in a studio format. The MTV Unplugged version of "Zombie" appeared on the band's "When You're Gone" North American Maxi single and the one of "Yesterday's Gone", on the Beneath the Skin – Live in Paris DVD. The show aired for the first time on April 18, 1995. The full performance was released on vinyl, cd, and digitally over 30 years later on November 7th, 2025.

Track list

- "Dreaming My Dreams"
- "Ode to My Family"
- "Linger"
- "Free to Decide"
- "I'm Still Remembering"
- "Empty"
- "Zombie"
- "Yesterday's Gone"
- "No Need to Argue"

=== The Musique Plus Session ===
On 6 May 1999, The Cranberries recorded a live performance in the Musique Plus studios in Montreal (Canada). The one and a half hour show was hosted by VJs Pierre Landry and Elsie Martins, who interviewed the band and asked questions from the audience.

Track list

- "Animal Instinct"
- "Promises"
- "Ode to My Family"
- "Linger"
- "You and Me"
- "I Can't Be With You"
- "Zombie"
- "Dreams"

=== Hard Rock Live ===
On May 15, 1999, The Cranberries recorded a live electric performance at The Joint in Las Vegas for the series Hard Rock Live on American music channel VH1.

Track list

- "Promises"
- "Linger"
- "Delilah"
- "Zombie"

=== Sessions at West 54th ===
The Cranberries were featured on a Sessions at West 54th episode on May 14, 2000. The show was taped in New York City and featured a short interview with lead singer Dolores O'Riordan.

Track list

- "Linger"
- "Desperate Andy"
- "Promises"
- "Zombie"
- "Dreams"

=== Live from the Lounge ===
On August 13, 2001, The Cranberries were guests at the Live from the Lounge show, hosted by Ryan Seacrest on L.A.-based radio station Star 98.7, two months before the release of their fifth album Wake Up and Smell the Coffee. This one-hour show, which was also broadcast live on Internet, featured an extended interview with the band as well as questions from fans.

Track list

- "Dreams"
- "Analyse"
- "Linger"
- "Every Morning"
- "Free to Decide"
- "Never Grow Old"
- "Time Is Ticking Out"

=== MTV Asia Session ===
On 13 August 2002, The Cranberries recorded a MTV Asia Session in Singapore during their Asian tour.

Track list

- "Ode to My Family"
- "Dreams"
- "Analyse"
- "Zombie"
- "Stars"
- "Salvation"

== Other TV and radio performances ==
- Cork Rocks, RTÉ 2FM (Ireland), 1991 – "Uncertain"
- On the Waterfront, RTÉ Television (Ireland), 1992 – "Linger"
- MTV Most Wanted, MTV Television (Europe), 1994 - "Linger", "Dreaming My Dreams"
- Later with Jools Holand, BBC Television (London), 11 June 1994 - "Dreaming My Dreams", "No Need to Argue"
- MTV Most Wanted, MTV Television (Europe), 1995 - "Zombie", "Ode to my Family"
- Saturday Night Live, NBC Television (New York), 25 February 1995 - "Zombie", "Ode to my Family"
- Late Show with David Letterman, CBS Television (New York), 10 September 1996 - "Free to Decide"
- Late Show with David Letterman, CBS Television (New York), 26 April 1999 - "Promises"
- The Rosie O'Donnell Show (New York), 27 April 1999 - "Promises"
- The Tonight Show with Jay Leno, NBC Television (New York), 15 September 1999 - "Just My Imagination"
- 3FM Radio (Hilversum, Netherlands), 24 September 2001 – "Analyse", "Time Is Ticking Out", "Linger", "Dreams"
- CD:UK, iTV, (London, England), 6 October 2001 – "Analyse (Oceanic remix live)"
- The Edge 102 FM (Toronto, Canada), 6 December 2001 – "Analyse", "Ode to my Family", "Linger"
- The One Show (London, England), 28 April 2017 - Linger (Acoustic Version)
