= We Are Leo =

American pop artist

- Origin: Chicago, IL
- Genres: Christian Contemporary, pop, EDM
- Years active: 2011–present
- Label: Dream Records
- Members: David Duffield; Joseph Sanborn; Matt Gainsford
- Past members: Jonny Duffield; Andrew Alojipan; John Panzer III; Doug Weier; Josh Sentner
- Website: weareleomusic.com

We Are Leo is a pop artist and producer from the Chicago area. The project also currently features contributions from singer Joseph Sanborn and bassist Howard Lalgee and was originally founded by David Duffield and Jonny Duffield with support from Ben Kasica and Joe Snyder and band members Doug Weier, Andrew Alojipan. Since 2011 We Are Leo has released 4 albums, 10 singles (nearing 30 Million Global streams to date) and has toured extensively appearing at most major Christian Festivals, Youth Conferences such as Acquire the Fire, and over 125 schools with faith-based non-profit Remedy Live.

They are best known in collaboration with YouTube’s Dude Perfect which features 7 of their songs in popular videos. The band commenced as a musical entity in 2011, with their first release, Hello, an extended play that was released on August 30, 2011 with Skies Fall Records. Their first studio album, Hello Again, was released on June 23, 2012, from Skies Fall Records. The subsequent studio album, Fightback Soundtrack, was released in 2014 from Dream Records. This was followed by The Rush and the Roar, which was released on May 26, 2017. They have since released a string of singles to music streaming services.

== Music history ==
The band commenced as a musical entity in 2011, with their first release, Hello, an extended play, that was released on August 30, 2011, with Skies Fall Records. Their first studio album, Hello Again, was released on June 23, 2012, from Skies Fall Records. The subsequent studio album, Fightback Soundtrack, was released on October 14, 2014, by Dream Records.

== Members ==
David Duffield- Duffield is the only standing member remaining in the band. He has been a member from 2012 - 2025.

Joseph Sanborn- Sanborn joined the group sometime in 2017 and quietly left in 2024. He was featured on the cover art for "My Peace".

Lawrence Kirby- Kirby was never an official member but collaborated with Duffield on "So Good To Me (HALLELUJAH)" in 2024.

Andrew Alojipan- Alojipan was a member of the group from 2013 to 2014 and worked on Fightback Soundtrack with Duffield, his brother Jonny, and Doug Weier.

Doug Weier- Weier, like Alojipan, worked with the group from 2013 to 2014, working on Fightback Soundtrack.

Josh Sentner- Sentner's time in the group was a little confusing. He was part of the band when they released The Rush And The Roar, yet never publicly stated that he left the group. With Duffield currently being the only member, and him and Joseph Sanborn being a duo from 2020 onward, up until 2023 we can assume he left sometime between 2017 and 2019. The Rush And The Roar, releasing in 2017, was not his first contribution to the band. In 2015, he remixed the song "Epic", which could be considered being a part of the group, but he was not spoken of again until 2016 when he joined officially.

== Discography ==
Studio albums

- Hello Again (June 23, 2012, Skies Fall)
- Fightback Soundtrack (October 14, 2014, Dream)
- The Rush & The Roar (May 26, 2017, Dream)

EPs

- Hello (August 30, 2011, Skies Fall)

Singles

Year	Single	Chart Positions	
Year	Single	US Chr Rock	Christian AC/CHR
2011	"Live for Love"	18	–
2012	"Supernova Sunrise"	1	–
2013	"Oxygen"	–	29
2013	"Heartbeats"	–	28
2015	"You're the Best Thing"	–	30
2015	"Diamonds in the Dark"	8	22
2018	"Dimensions"	21	34
2019	"Dance + You"	—	—
