= Roses (The Cranberries album) =

Studio album by The Cranberries
- Released: 21 February 2012
- Recorded: April 2002 – June 2003, May 2011
- Studios: Metalworks Studios (Mississauga); Miloco Studios (London)
- Genres: Alternative rock; pop rock
- Length: 44:20
- Label: Cooking Vinyl
- Producer: Stephen Street

The Cranberries chronology
Bualadh Bos – The Cranberries Live (2009)	Roses (2012)	Something Else (2017)

Singles from Roses
- 1. "Show Me" Released: 17 October 2011 (promotional single); 2. "Tomorrow" Released: 21 November 2011; 3. "Losing My Mind" Released: 22 February 2012 (Irish radio only); 4. "Raining in My Heart" Released: 9 March 2012 (Italian radio only); 5. "Waiting in Walthamstow" Released: 18 June 2012 (UK radio only); 6. "Fire & Soul" Released: 5 December 2012 (Russian radio only)

Professional ratings
Aggregate scores
Source	Rating
Metacritic	59/100
Review scores
Source	Rating
AllMusic	2.5/5 stars
American Songwriter	3/5 stars
The A.V. Club	C
Consequence of Sound	3.5/5 stars
Entertainment Weekly	C+
The Independent	2/5 stars
The Phoenix	2.5/4 stars
PopMatters	7/10 stars
Rolling Stone	3/5 stars
USA Today	2.5/4 stars

Roses is the sixth studio album by Irish alternative rock band the Cranberries, released in the Republic of Ireland on 21 February 2012 and globally on 27 February 2012 through Cooking Vinyl and Downtown Records. Produced by Stephen Street, it was the band's first studio release in ten years. Originally planned to be released in late 2003, the recordings for the follow-up to Wake Up and Smell the Coffee were scrapped after the band decided to go their separate ways. After a six-year hiatus, The Cranberries announced their intention to record a new album during their 2009–2010 reunion tour. The title Roses was announced on The Cranberries website, on 24 May 2011.

In 2012 it was awarded a gold certification from the Independent Music Companies Association which indicated sales of at least 75,000 copies throughout Europe.

== Recording sessions ==
The Cranberries worked on 19 tracks for the Roses album in Toronto and London between April 2002 and June 2003 with producer Stephen Street, who previously collaborated with the band on Everybody Else Is Doing It, So Why Can't We?, No Need to Argue and Wake Up and Smell the Coffee. Seventeen tracks were finished for the album. According to producer Stephen Street, the recordings recapture "the delicate darker mood of [the earlier Cranberries albums]". The album included string arrangements.

=== First session (Metalworks Studios, Mississauga, Ontario) ===
The Cranberries recorded 18 tracks at the Metalworks Studios in Mississauga, Ontario (Canada) from 18 April 2002 to 29 June 2003. All album tracks, except "Tomorrow", were recorded during the first session. "Losing My Mind" was first titled "Eyelash".

=== Second session (Miloco Studios, London) ===
The band and producer Stephen Street went into the studio at the Miloco Studios in London and "Tomorrow", was recorded during April 2011, and the other tracks were completed during this recording session. "Stars" was replaced by the new track "Tomorrow".

== Composition ==
Asked about "Tomorrow", O'Riordan told Billboard that "it's about the way we sometimes hyper over-escalate things in our minds, overthink about things...when sometimes spontaneity and just jumping in is better. Tomorrow you might not have that moment back again. So it's really about moving on and also about kind of looking at the younger generation and how they worry about all kinds of silly things. They don't think they're silly, but when you're older you know better." A one-minute preview of the song was released on 31 July 2011.

"Astral Projection" is described as "a dreamy rock song which could be catchy", while "In It Together" "is a very feel good song creating the same type of atmosphere as 'Stars' – colourful".

"Schizophrenic Playboy" is a rock song dealing about the risks of sexual encounters. Noel Hogan described the studio mix of the song as "very James Bond". A one-minute preview of the song was released on 31 August 2011.

"Fire and Soul" is a ballad with drum loops and light electronica elements. A one-minute preview of the song was released on 13 October 2011.

The songs vary in pace and mood, from the soft and summery "Fire and Soul" to the reggae-infused "Raining in My Heart" and the sweeping storm that rages within "Conduct." The title track "Roses" is described as a "very sparse [...], but a very strong track". The music was written by guitarist Noel Hogan a few years before the band went back into recording sessions.

The songs were planned to be included on the cancelled 2003 album. The band first worked on those titles with producer Stephen Street during some recording sessions in 2003, before re-recording them for the Roses album in 2011.

== Track listing ==
All lyrics are written by Dolores O'Riordan; all music is composed by O'Riordan and Noel Hogan, except tracks 2, 7, 8 and 10, which are by O'Riordan.

No.	Title	Length
1.	"Conduct"	5:10
2.	"Tomorrow"	3:56
3.	"Fire & Soul"	4:31
4.	"Raining in My Heart"	3:26
5.	"Losing My Mind"	3:39
6.	"Schizophrenic Playboys"	3:39
7.	"Waiting in Walthamstow"	4:18
8.	"Show Me"	3:26
9.	"Astral Projections"	4:44
10.	"So Good"	3:53
11.	"Roses"	3:40

iTunes bonus tracks – Ireland and UK extended version (includes Live in Madrid)
No.	Title	Length
12.	"Dreams" (live)	4:35
13.	"Always"	3:10
14.	"Perfect World" (Deluxe edition only)	3:44

iTunes US bonus tracks
No.	Title	Length
12.	"Always"	3:10
13.	"Linger" (live in Madrid 2010 – deluxe edition only)	4:57
14.	"Zombie" (live in Madrid 2010 – deluxe edition only)	5:09

iTunes Canada deluxe edition (includes Live in Madrid)
No.	Title	Length
12.	"Always"	3:10
13.	"Stop Me"	3:12

Exclusive Amazon Germany digital edition (includes Live in Madrid)
No.	Title	Length
12.	"In It Together"	3:07
13.	"Serendipity"	3:12

Amazon Japan digital edition
No.	Title	Length
12.	"Someday"	3:49
13.	"Animal Instinct" (Live in Madrid)	3:47
14.	"Linger" (Live in Madrid)	4:57
15.	"Salvation" (Live in Madrid)	2:33
16.	"Zombie" (Live in Madrid)	5:09
17.	"Promises" (Live in Madrid)	4:03

iTunes international bonus tracks
No.	Title	Length
12.	"Dreams" (live)	4:35
13.	"Always"	3:10

iTunes international deluxe edition (includes Live in Madrid)
No.	Title	Length
12.	"Dreams" (live)	4:35
13.	"Always"	3:10

2 CD limited edition (Live in Madrid, 2010)
No.	Title	Length
1.	"Analyse" (live in Madrid 2010)	4:24
2.	"Animal Instinct" (live in Madrid 2010)	3:47
3.	"How" (live in Madrid 2010)	3:02
4.	"Linger" (live in Madrid 2010)	4:57
5.	"Dreaming My Dreams" (live in Madrid 2010)	3:57
6.	"When You're Gone" (live in Madrid 2010)	4:38
7.	"Wanted" (live in Madrid 2010)	2:08
8.	"Salvation" (live in Madrid 2010)	2:33
9.	"Desperate Andy" (live in Madrid 2010)	3:56
10.	"I Can't Be With You" (live in Madrid 2010)	4:59
11.	"Ode to My Family" (live in Madrid 2010)	5:09
12.	"Free to Decide" (live in Madrid 2010)	3:21
13.	"Ridiculous Thoughts" (live in Madrid 2010)	5:19
14.	"Zombie" (live in Madrid 2010)	5:09
15.	"Shattered" (live in Madrid 2010)	5:32
16.	"Promises" (live in Madrid 2010)	4:03

== Personnel ==
=== The Cranberries ===
- Fergal Lawler – Drums and percussion
- Mike Hogan – Bass
- Noel Hogan – Guitars, keyboards, melodica and drum programming
- Dolores O'Riordan – Vocals, lyrics and string melodies

=== Additional musicians ===
- Stephen Street – Acoustic guitar, keyboards and tambourine
- Dan Brodbeck – Strings and string melodies
- Kevin Hearn – Accordion
- Duke Quartet – Strings
  - Louisa Fuller – Violin
  - Rick Koster – Violin
  - John Metcalfe – Viola and string arrangements
  - Sophie Harris – Cello

== Charts ==
In France, the album debuted at number 5 on the French Albums Chart, selling 8,950 copies, in Canada, the album debuted at number 6 on the Canadian Albums Chart, selling 3,100 copies.

=== Weekly charts ===
Weekly chart performance for Roses
Chart (2012)	Peak position
Austrian Albums (Ö3 Austria)	28
Belgian Albums (Ultratop Flanders)	39
Belgian Albums (Ultratop Wallonia)	8
Canadian Albums (Billboard)	6
Czech Albums (ČNS IFPI)	36
Dutch Albums (Album Top 100)	38
French Albums (SNEP)	5
German Albums (Offizielle Top 100)	13
Irish Albums (IRMA)	17
Italian Albums (FIMI)	9
New Zealand Albums (RMNZ)	38
Polish Albums (ZPAV)	6
Spanish Albums (Promusicae)	17
Swiss Albums (Schweizer Hitparade)	10
UK Albums (Official Charts)	37
US Billboard 200	51
US Top Alternative Albums (Billboard)	9
US Independent Albums (Billboard)	4
US Top Rock Albums (Billboard)	10

Chart performance for Roses upon Dolores Riordan's death
Chart (2018)	Peak position
UK Albums (Official Charts)	73

=== Year-end charts ===
Year-end chart performance for Roses
Chart (2012)	Position
French Albums (SNEP)	110

== Release history ==
During an interview with Billboard magazine in October, lead vocalist Dolores O'Riordan revealed that the album would be released in February 2012.

On 21 July, guitarist Noel Hogan suggested the possibility of releasing an EP before the release of Roses.

Region	Date	Label
Italy	21 February 2012	Cooking Vinyl
Japan	22 February 2012	Hostess Entertainment
Republic of Ireland	24 February 2012	Timeless Solutions
Australia	24 February 2012	Shock Records
Germany	27 February 2012	Vertigo Berlin/Universal
Worldwide	27 February 2012	Cooking Vinyl
Russia	27 February 2012	Soyuz Music
United States	28 February 2012	Downtown Records
Canada	28 February 2012	Gold Lake Records
Philippines	3 March 2012	Universal Records

== Certifications ==
Certifications for Roses
Region	Certification	Certified units/sales
Poland (ZPAV)	Gold	10,000^{*}
^{*} Sales figures based on certification alone.
