= MTV Unplugged (The Cranberries album) =

Live album by the Cranberries
- Released: 7 November 2025
- Recorded: 14 February 1995
- Venues: Howard Gilman Opera House, The Brooklyn Academy of Music, New York
- Genre: Acoustic rock
- Length: 42:01
- Label: Island

The Cranberries chronology
Remembering Dolores (2021)	MTV Unplugged (2025)

MTV Unplugged is a live album by Irish alternative rock band the Cranberries, released on 7 November 2025 by Island Records.

== Background and release ==
MTV Unplugged documents the Cranberries' appearance on MTV Unplugged, an American music television program where artists perform acoustic versions of their music. The performance was the main promotion for the band's second album No Need to Argue, which was released on 3 October the previous year of the album's release. The performance of "Yesterday's Gone" was released as a single to promote the 25th anniversary of No Need to Argue. The performance of "Empty" was released as a single to promote the live album.

== Critical reception ==
Professional ratings
Review scores
Source	Rating
AllMusic	3.5/5 stars

Neil Z. Yeung of AllMusic stated that it "came at a time when they had cemented their mainstream presence", noting that "Following Dolores O'Riordan's passing in 2018, the wealth of material that came from the vaults remained generous and worthwhile; this special set is one of the highlights." Chorus.fm critic Adam Grundy states that MTV Unplugged "continues to live on with grace on this ultra-memorable performance from The Cranberries.", concluding by stating that "The Cranberries firmly cement their status as one of the best performances in the MTV Unplugged series, and highlight the reason why their music still lives on to this day and is adored by fans all over the world."

== Track listing ==
All lyrics are written by Dolores O'Riordan; all music is composed by O'Riordan and Noel Hogan, except tracks 1, 7, and 9, written solely by O'Riordan.

No.	Title	Length
1.	"Intro"/"Dreaming My Dreams"	4:39
2.	"Ode to My Family"	6:00
3.	"Linger"	5:06
4.	"Free to Decide"	4:49
5.	"I'm Still Remembering"	5:12
6.	"Empty"	4:10
7.	"Zombie"	4:30
8.	"Yesterday's Gone"	4:05
9.	"No Need to Argue"	3:30
Total length:		42:01

== Personnel ==
The Cranberries

- Dolores O'Riordan – vocals, guitar
- Noel Hogan – guitars
- Mike Hogan – bass guitar
- Fergal Lawler – drums, percussion

Additional musicians

- Caroline Lavelle
- Jocelyn Pook
- Sonya Slany
- Jules Singleton

== Charts ==
Initial chart performance for MTV Unplugged
Chart (2025)	Peak position
Austrian Albums (Ö3 Austria)	10
Belgian Albums (Ultratop Wallonia)	55
Belgian Albums (Ultratop Flanders)	151
French Albums (SNEP)	75
French Rock & Metal Albums (SNEP)	3
German Albums (Offizielle Top 100)	22
Scottish Albums (Official Charts)	22
Swiss Albums (Schweizer Hitparade)	23
US Top Album Sales (Billboard)	14
US Top Current Album Sales (Billboard)	13
US Indie Store Album Sales (Billboard)	8
US Vinyl Albums (Billboard)	8
