= Nothing Left at All =

1990 EP by the Cranberries

EP by The Cranberry Saw Us
- Released: 1990
- Recorded: 1990
- Studio: Xeric Studios, Limerick, Ireland
- Genre: Indie rock; indie pop; alternative rock
- Length: 11:39
- Label: Xeric Records (XER 012)
- Producer: Pearse Gilmore; Mike Mahoney

The Cranberry Saw Us chronology
Water Circle (1990)	Nothing Left at All (1990)	Uncertain (1991)

Nothing Left at All is the first commercial EP of the Irish band The Cranberry Saw Us. It was released by Xeric Records in cassette format. Xeric Records made 300 copies and they sold out at local stores within a few days. This is the band’s last album to be released under their original name. The song "Shine Down" appears only on this tape. It was later known as "Take My Soul Away", but was never re-recorded.

== Track listing ==
All songs by Noel Hogan and Dolores O'Riordan.

1. "Nothing Left at All" (3:51)
2. "Pathetic Senses" (3:35)
3. "Shine Down" (4:13)

== Personnel ==
The Cranberry Saw Us

- Dolores O'Riordan – vocals, keyboards
- Noel Hogan – guitar, backing vocals
- Mike Hogan – bass guitar
- Fergal Lawler – drums

Additional personnel

- Pearse Gilmore – production, engineering, additional vocals on "Pathetic Senses"
- Mike Mahoney – production, additional vocals on "Pathetic Senses"
