= Water Circle =

1990 EP by the Cranberries

EP by The Cranberry Saw Us
- Released: August 1990
- Recorded: 1990
- Studio: Xeric Studios, Limerick, Ireland
- Genre: Indie rock; jangle-pop; alternative rock
- Length: 17:08
- Label: Xeric (XER 011)
- Producer: Pearce Gilmore

The Cranberry Saw Us chronology
Anything (1990)	Water Circle (1990)	Nothing Left at All (1990)

Water Circle is the second demo EP of the Irish band The Cranberry Saw Us. It was released in cassette format and was used as an unsolicited demo sent to various major record labels. This is the first release to feature the vocal stylings of Dolores O'Riordan. All songs on the EP are written by Dolores O'Riordan and Noel Hogan. A bootleg MP3 of Water Circle appeared on the internet in 2002 courtesy of The Cranberries' drummer Fergal Lawler, who gave two CD-Rs of rare tracks to Alex Kraus, owner of the now closed fan site zomebieguide.com. In 2011, the actual cassette EP had appeared on eBay with an asking price of US$1499.95. It is the only copy known to still exist in a fan collection, owned by Mr Kraus. At least one other copy exists, because Noel Hogan posted on his Instagram account a photo with some of his old The Cranberries' tapes and Water Circle is among them.

== Television performance ==
To promote Water Circle, The Cranberries appeared on the Irish television show On The Waterfront which was hosted by Robert Arkins and Felim Gormley from The Commitments. They performed "Linger", which was recorded and was broadcast in 1992.

== Track listing ==
All songs written by Dolores O'Riordan and Noel Hogan.

1. "Sunday"
2. "Linger"
3. "Chrome Paint"
4. "A Fast One"

== Personnel ==
Personnel taken from Water Circle liner notes.

The Cranberries

- Mike Hogan
- Dolores O'Riordan
- Fergal Lawler
- Noel Hogan

Additional personnel

- Pearse – producer
