= Fightback Soundtrack =

Studio album by We Are Leo
- Released: October 14, 2014
- Genre: Contemporary Christian music, electronica, pop rock
- Length: 43:41
- Label: Dream

We Are Leo chronology
Hello Again (2012)	Fightback Soundtrack (2014)

Fightback Soundtrack is the second studio album by We Are Leo. Dream Records released the album on October 14, 2014.

== Critical reception ==
Professional ratings
Review scores
Source	Rating
365 Days of Inspiring Media	3.5/5 stars
Christian Music Review	3.5/5
Christian Review Magazine	5/5 stars
CM Addict	3.5/5 stars
Cross Rhythms	7/10 squares
Jesus Freak Hideout	3.5/5 stars
Jesus Wired	8.5/10 stars
New Release Today	4/5 stars

Awarding the album three and a half stars from Jesus Freak Hideout, Christopher Smith states, "Fightback Soundtrack is an enjoyable and encouraging listen". Paul S. Ganney, rating the album a seven out of ten for Cross Rhythms, says, "They'll be a huge hit at a teenage festival". Giving the album four stars at New Release Today, Caitlin Lassiter writes, "Fightback Soundtrack seems to have an evolved, more mature sound". Leah St. John, awarding the album five stars by Christian Review Magazine, describes, "Fightback Soundtrack is a standout album". Rating the album 3.5 out of five for Christian Music Review, Laura Chambers writes, "We Are Leo seeks to inspire us to do more than drop back and be overtaken". Jonathan Andre, giving the album three and a half stars from 365 Days of Inspiring Media, says, "though sometimes sounding cliché and cheesy, is recorded well, and is a joy to hear these young men of God create meaningful pop/rock and dance music, that can transcend any belief system." Awarding the album three and a half stars at CM Addict, Andrew Funderburk states, the album is "For a fun, engaging, yet heart-impacting musical experience". Jessica Morris, rating the album 8.5 out of ten stars by Jesus Wired, describes, "We Are Leo's Fight Back Soundtrack is a testament to the band’s loyal fans".

== Track listing ==
No.	Title	Length
1.	"Yours4Sure"	3:49
2.	"Captivated"	3:21
3.	"Phoenix"	3:31
4.	"Fightback Soundtrack"	3:13
5.	"Epic"	4:02
6.	"Diamonds in the Dark"	3:26
7.	"Amnesia"	4:41
8.	"Fire inside You"	2:59
9.	"Yesterday's Gone"	3:08
10.	"You're the Best Thing"	3:21
11.	"Northern Lights"	3:44
12.	"Until Forever"	4:26
Total length:		43:41
