= Analyse (The Cranberries song) =

2001 single by the Cranberries

Single by the Cranberries

from the album Wake Up and Smell the Coffee
- Released: 27 August 2001
- Genre: Rock
- Length: 4:14 (album version); 3:58 (radio edit)
- Label: MCA
- Songwriter: Dolores O'Riordan
- Producer: Stephen Street

The Cranberries singles chronology
"You and Me" (2000)	"Analyse" (2001)	"Time Is Ticking Out" (2002)

Music video
- "Analyse" on YouTube

"Analyse" is a song by Irish rock band the Cranberries. It was the first single released from their fifth studio album, Wake Up and Smell the Coffee (2001), on 27 August 2001. The promotional video, directed by Keir McFarlane, had to be edited in consequence of the 9/11 attacks, which was partly responsible for the single's low chart positions in their native Ireland (number 28) and the United Kingdom (number 89), but it became a top-10 hit in Italy, Portugal, and Spain.

== Remixes and other releases ==
Music producer Marius de Vries was commissioned to remix "Analyse". The remix, which is called the "Oceanic remix", is a chill-out version of the original song with light electronica elements and piano additions. While an edited version was made available on some commercial singles, the long version was released only on promotional CDs. Previously, the Cranberries also released an airy and distorted mix of Zombie, called "Camel's Hump Mix", on the "When You're Gone" single and some slightly different mixes of "How" ("Linger" single) and "Pretty" (Prêt-à-Porter soundtrack). De Vries also remixed the band's next single, "Time Is Ticking Out".

Acoustic versions of "Analyse" were released on two US radio compilations. The first one, included on KBCO Studio C, Volume 13, was recorded at the Boulder-based radio station KBCO on 16 August 2001, while the second one was recorded at Studio C of the Minneapolis-based radio station KTCZ-FM on 20 August 2001 and included on the Cities 97 Sampler Volume 13. The studio version "Analyse" was to be released on the Sweet November soundtrack but was ultimately not included due to the timing of the album release.

== Music video ==
A promotional video, directed by Keir McFarlane, was planned to be released in September 2001. The original video, which pictured O'Riordan performing atop a building as a plane flew over two skyscrapers, was recalled from media after having been sent to the world's major video networks before the 9/11 attacks in New York. An edited version, where all airplane images were erased, was sent back to media on 1 October 2001. Both versions of the video are included on the Stars: The Best of Videos 1992–2002 DVD.

== Track listings ==
UK CD single

1. "Analyse" (album radio edit)
2. "Analyse" (Oceanic radio edit)
3. "I Can't Be with You" (live at Vicar Street, Dublin, 11 November 2000)

European CD single

1. "Analyse" (LP version) – 4:14
2. "Wanted" (live in Paris) – 1:57

European, Australian, and Japanese maxi-CD single

1. "Analyse" (radio edit)
2. "Analyse" (Oceanic radio edit)
3. "I Can't Be with You" (live at Vicar Street, Dublin, 11 November 2000)
4. "In the Ghetto" (live at Vicar Street, Dublin, 11 November 2000)

== Charts ==
=== Weekly charts ===
Weekly chart performance for "Analyse"
Chart (2001)	Peak position
Belgium (Ultratip Bubbling Under Wallonia)	14
Europe (Eurochart Hot 100)	69
France (SNEP)	57
Ireland (IRMA)	28
Italy (FIMI)	4
Netherlands (Single Top 100)	76
Portugal (AFP)	5
Romania (Romanian Top 100)	55
Spain (Promusicae)	3
Switzerland (Schweizer Hitparade)	43
UK Singles (OCC)	89
US Adult Alternative Airplay (Billboard)	16
US Adult Pop Airplay (Billboard)	26

=== Year-end charts ===
Year-end chart performance for "Analyse"
Chart (2001)	Position
US Adult Top 40 (Billboard)	83

== Release history ==
Release dates and formats for "Analyse"
Region	Date	Format(s)	Label(s)	Ref.
United States	27 August 2001	Hot adult contemporary; triple A radio	MCA	
Continental Europe	17 September 2001	CD	MCA	
Australia	17 September 2001	CD	MCA	
Japan	11 October 2001	CD	MCA	
United Kingdom	15 October 2001	CD	MCA	
United States	30 October 2001	Contemporary hit radio	MCA	
