= Anything (The Cranberry Saw Us demo) =

1990 EP by the Cranberries

EP by The Cranberry Saw Us
- Released: January 1990
- Recorded: 1989
- Studios: Xeric Studios, Limerick, Ireland
- Genre: Alternative rock
- Length: 12:58
- Label: Self-released
- Producer: Pearse Gilmore

The Cranberry Saw Us chronology
Anything (1990)	Water Circle (1990)

Anything is the first demo EP by Irish band the Cranberry Saw Us, later known as the Cranberries. It was self-released on cassette format. This is the only release to feature the original singer Niall Quinn. By their next release, Water Circle, Niall Quinn had been replaced by Dolores O'Riordan as lead vocalist and primary songwriter. Guitarist Noel Hogan designed the cover art. He made an error in the band's name, spelling it "The Cranbery Saw Us" on both the cover and the liner notes. The liner notes show the original sale price was £2.00 and overwritten with £2.50. There are no surnames mentioned in the liner notes.

== Track listing ==
All tracks written by Niall Quinn unless noted.

1. "Throw Me Down a Big Stairs" (N. Quinn, M. Smyth) – 2:31
2. "How's It Going to Bleed" (N. Hogan, N. Quinn) – 3:54
3. "Storm in a Teacup" – 3:41
4. "Good Morning God" – 2:52

== Personnel ==
The Cranberry Saw Us

- Niall Quinn – vocals, guitar
- Noel Hogan – guitar, vocals
- Mike Hogan – bass guitar
- Fergal Lawler – drums

Additional personnel

- Jim – keyboards
- Andy – harmonica
- Morgan – accordion
- Claire – violin
- Pearse Gilmore – engineer
