= Time Is Ticking Out =

2002 single by The Cranberries

Single by the Cranberries

from the album Wake Up and Smell the Coffee
- B-side: "Time Is Ticking Out" (Marius de Vries remix)
- Released: 4 February 2002
- Length: 2:59
- Label: MCA
- Composers: Dolores O'Riordan, Noel Hogan
- Lyricist: Dolores O'Riordan
- Producer: Stephen Street

The Cranberries singles chronology
"Analyse" (2001)	"Time Is Ticking Out" (2002)	"This Is the Day" (2002)

"Time Is Ticking Out" is a song by Irish band the Cranberries. It was the second single from their fifth studio album, Wake Up and Smell the Coffee, on 4 February 2002. Dolores O'Riordan wrote the song after she had seen the children of Chernobyl born with many illnesses. The Cranberries donated all the proceeds of the single to the Chernobyl Children’s Project charity. A promotional video, directed by Maurice Linnane, features the band members as modern-life The Wizard of Oz characters.

== Remixes ==
As for the "Analyse" single, music producer Marius de Vries was commissioned to remix "Time Is Ticking Out". Four versions of the up-tempo remix were released, either physically or digitally. The long version was made available on the 4-track commercial single, while a 3:59-edit version was featured on some promotions CDs as well as on the Asian Tour Special Edition of Wake Up and Smell the Coffee. An instrumental mix was also released on vinyl. Finally, a slightly different 4:55 version of unknown origin was released digitally on Internet.

== Track listings ==
2-track CD single

1. "Time Is Ticking Out" (album version) – 2:59
2. "Loud and Clear" (live at Vicar Street, Dublin – November 11, 2000) – 2:25

4-track CD single

1. "Time Is Ticking Out" (album version) – 2:59
2. "Time Is Ticking Out" (Marius de Vries remix) – 5:12
3. "Shattered" (live at Vicar Street, Dublin – November 11, 2000) – 3:38
4. "Analyse" (enhanced video)

== Charts ==
Weekly chart performance for "Time Is Ticking Out"
Chart (2002)	Peak position
Italy (FIMI)	38
