= Wake Up and Smell the Coffee =

- International cover. The UK special edition uses a similar, brighter image

Studio album by the Cranberries
- Released: 22 October 2001
- Studio: Windmill Lane (Dublin)
- Genres: Pop rock; alternative rock
- Length: 44:23
- Label: MCA
- Producer: Stephen Street

The Cranberries chronology
Bury the Hatchet (1999)	Wake Up and Smell the Coffee (2001)	Treasure Box – The Complete Sessions 1991–1999 (2002)

Singles from Wake Up and Smell the Coffee
- 1. "Analyse" Released: 27 August 2001; 2. "Time Is Ticking Out" Released: 4 February 2002; 3. "This Is the Day" Released: 16 July 2002

Professional ratings
Aggregate scores
Source	Rating
Metacritic	62/100
Review scores
Source	Rating
AllMusic	3/5 stars
Alternative Press	3/5 stars
Blender	4/5 stars
E! Online	C+
Entertainment Weekly	C−
Q	3/5 stars
Slant Magazine	3/5 stars

Wake Up and Smell the Coffee is the fifth studio album by Irish alternative rock band the Cranberries, and their last before their six-year hiatus. Released on 22 October 2001, the album sold 170,000 copies in the US by April 2007. Worldwide, the album had sold 1,300,000 copies by 2002.

This marks the band's only album on MCA Records. They were transferred to MCA after the merger of PolyGram (which owned their previous label, Island Records) with MCA's parent Universal Music Group in 1999.

While the album did not initially receive a vinyl release, on 16 February 2023, it was announced that the album would receive a limited vinyl issue for Record Store Day on 22 April 2023.

== Artwork ==
Several different covers exist for the album, with the most widely distributed being a man lying in a bed on the beach with gym balls moving towards him. Later European editions, namely the UK special edition, use a similar, brighter shot taken at a different time of day with a slightly different number of gym balls. The American version of the album uses a shot of the clustered gym balls as the main cover art, with the man in bed on the reverse side of the image (the other side of the booklet). The Japanese edition also uses a shot of the gym balls, but bouncing on a grass field instead of the beach.

Designer Storm Thorgerson, who also designed the cover of their previous album, Bury the Hatchet, said: "The idea of red balls came from granules of coffee percolating the atmosphere, settling in your nose and waking you up. These became red (cranberries) and then enlarged to gym balls to satisfy our rampant egos. The location changed from an interior to an open space. Because this idea was preposterous, it needed testing before we did the proper thing on a beach in Somerset. The test... was done on a small grass aerodrome near London."

The version of the artwork featuring a man in bed on the beach is similar in concept to another Thorgerson creation, Pink Floyd's A Momentary Lapse of Reason. Thorgerson's anomalous red balls recall another of his earlier album covers, Elegy by The Nice (1970).

== Critical reception ==
At review aggregator Metacritic, the album received a score of 62 out of 100 based on nine critics' reviews, indicating "generally favorable" reception. Stephen Thomas Erlewine of AllMusic called the album "as reminiscent of their debut as anything they've done since" as well as "melodic, stately, and somber [...] with a dogged sense of decorum that keeps not just the group's musical excesses in check, but also O'Riordan's political polemics", although found there to be nothing that "really result[s] in a record that will restore the Cranberries to the status they enjoyed in the early '90s".

John Aizlewood of Blender described Wake Up and Smell the Coffee as "the set of inspired anthems they needed to deliver in '96—all tremulous vocals from Dolores O'Riordan [...] and encouraging lyrics [...] It may be too late, but it's not too little." Alternative Press found it to be a "slight improvement" on Bury the Hatchet (1999), and Q felt it was "Charming, if slight". Sal Cinequemani of Slant Magazine wrote that the album "sticks to what the Cranberries do best: constructing the radio-friendliest of pop alternatives", but concluded that "Dolores and company fall a bit short of the emotive and atmospheric heights" of their "creative (and commercial) zenith", No Need to Argue (1994).

E! commented that "the band sounds strong but derivative of its own best work", going on to say that "O'Riordan's voice aims for spiritual passion but sometimes, as in the title track, becomes a chafing bray" and that it "may please old fans". Chris Willman of Entertainment Weekly wrote: "It's official: Dolores O'Riordan is rock's most vapid lyricist", quoting O'Riordan's couplets "Birds in the sky/They look so high" from "Never Grow Old" and "Looks like we've screwed up the ozone layer/I wonder if the politicians cay-ay-are" from "Time Is Ticking Out" as examples. Willman found positives to be the return of "original producer Stephen Street", who makes "a few tracks into palatable ear candy, and O'Riordan ha[ving] traded stridency for softer tones".

== Track listing ==
All lyrics are written by Dolores O'Riordan; all music is composed by O'Riordan except where noted.

Wake Up and Smell the Coffee track listing
No.	Title	Writer(s)	Length
1.	"Never Grow Old"		2:35
2.	"Analyse"		4:10
3.	"Time Is Ticking Out"	O'Riordan, Noel Hogan	2:59
4.	"Dying Inside"	O'Riordan, Hogan	3:10
5.	"This Is the Day"		4:15
6.	"The Concept"		3:03
7.	"Wake Up and Smell the Coffee"	O'Riordan, Hogan	5:15
8.	"Pretty Eyes"		3:48
9.	"I Really Hope"	O'Riordan, Hogan	3:42
10.	"Every Morning"		2:24
11.	"Do You Know"		3:09
12.	"Carry On"		2:21
13.	"Chocolate Brown"	O'Riordan, Hogan	3:32

US bonus track
No.	Title	Writer(s)	Length
14.	"Cape Town"	O'Riordan, Hogan	2:48

UK bonus tracks
No.	Title	Writer(s)	Length
14.	"Dreams" (live in Paris)	O'Riordan, Hogan	4:37
15.	"Promises" (live in Paris)		5:06
16.	"In the Ghetto" (Elvis Presley cover)	Mac Davis	2:42

International bonus tracks
No.	Title	Writer(s)	Length
14.	"Salvation" (live in Paris)	O'Riordan, Hogan	2:35
15.	"In the Ghetto" (Elvis Presley cover)	Davis	2:42

Japan bonus tracks
No.	Title	Writer(s)	Length
14.	"I Can't Be with You" (live in Paris)	O'Riordan, Hogan	3:13
15.	"Zombie" (live in Paris)		5:26
16.	"In the Ghetto" (Elvis Presley cover)	Davis	2:42

=== Other tracks ===
Bonus tracks and B-sides
Song	Length	Physical/digital release(s)
"In the Ghetto"	2:42	Wake Up and Smell the Coffee [UK edition] (bonus track); Wake Up and Smell the Coffee [International edition] (bonus track); Wake Up and Smell the Coffee [Japan edition] (bonus track)
"Cape Town"	2:48	Wake Up and Smell the Coffee [North American edition] (bonus track); Wake Up and Smell the Coffee [Asian tour edition] (bonus track)
"Many Days"	2:43	Digital format on The Cranberries website Wake Up and Smell the Coffee [Asian tour edition] (bonus track)
"Such a Waste"	2:31	"This Is the Day" single (B-side)
"7 Years"	2:46	Wake Up and Smell the Coffee [promo CD]

== Personnel ==
Personnel taken from Wake Up and Smell the Coffee liner notes.

The Cranberries

- Dolores O'Riordan – vocals, guitar, keyboards
- Noel Hogan – electric & acoustic guitar
- Mike Hogan – bass guitar
- Fergal Lawler – drums, percussion

Production

- Stephen Street – production, mixing
- Cenzo Townsend – engineering
- Emma Jane Lennon – engineering assistance
- Shay Dooher – engineering assistance
- George Marino – mastering
- Tom Stanley – mixing assistance
- Storm Thorgerson – cover design
- Peter Curzon – cover design

== Charts ==
=== Weekly charts ===
Weekly chart performance for Wake Up and Smell the Coffee
Chart (2001)	Peak position
Australian Albums (ARIA)	85
Austrian Albums (Ö3 Austria)	17
Belgian Albums (Ultratop Flanders)	49
Belgian Albums (Ultratop Wallonia)	7
Canadian Albums (Billboard)	8
Dutch Albums (Album Top 100)	24
French Albums (SNEP)	2
German Albums (Offizielle Top 100)	7
Hungarian Albums (MAHASZ)	15
Irish Albums (IRMA)	9
Italian Albums (FIMI)	2
Norwegian Albums (VG-lista)	16
Spanish Albums (AFYVE)	2
Swedish Albums (Sverigetopplistan)	27
Swiss Albums (Schweizer Hitparade)	6
UK Albums (Official Charts)	61
US Billboard 200	46

=== Year-end charts ===
2001 year-end chart performance for Wake Up and Smell the Coffee
Chart (2001)	Position
European Albums (Music & Media)	93
French Albums (SNEP)	38
Swiss Albums (Schweizer Hitparade)	73

2002 year-end chart performance for Wake Up and Smell the Coffee
Chart (2002)	Position
French Albums (SNEP)	139

== Certifications and sales ==
Certifications and sales for Wake Up and Smell the Coffee
Region	Certification	Certified units/sales
Canada (Music Canada)	Gold	50,000^{^}
France (SNEP)	2× Gold	200,000^{*}
Spain (Promusicae)	Gold	50,000^{^}
Switzerland (IFPI Switzerland)	Gold	20,000^{^}
United States	—	170,000
^{*} Sales figures based on certification alone.^{^} Shipments figures based on certification alone.
