= List of Sin City characters =

Sin City is a series of stories by Frank Miller, told in comic book form in a film noir-like style.

Listed below are the major and minor characters.

== Recurring characters ==
Character	The Hard Goodbye	A Dame to Kill For	The Big Fat Kill	That Yellow Bastard	Family Values	Hell and Back	Just Another Saturday Night	Silent Night	And Behind Door Number Three?	Blue Eyes	Wrong Turn	Wrong Track	The Babe Wore Red
Shellie	check	check	check	check			check			check			
Marv	check	check		check			check	check		check			
Dwight McCarthy		check	check	check	check	check							check
Nancy Callahan	check	check		check			check						
Miho		check	check		check				check				
Douglas Klump And Burt Schlubb (Fat Man And Little Boy)				check	check			check					check
Delia "Blue Eyes"						check				check	check	check	
The Man From 'The Customer Is Always Right'						check				check	check	check	
Manute		check	check			check							
Gail	check	check	check						check				
Goldie and Wendy	check	check							check				
Detective Bob		check		check									
Detective Mort		check		check									
Detective John Hartigan				check			check						

== Protagonists ==
- Marv, a hulking, violent giant of a man, who possesses an uncanny athleticism along with remarkable endurance for pain. As an ex-con, he spends his time on the streets doing odd jobs for various people. He is described as an "over the hill do-gooder" by several people, and admires long overcoats, taking them from those he kills. He suffers from an unknown mental condition (most likely some form of dementia) that causes him to, as Marv describes, "get confused." His symptoms seem to involve experiencing short-term memory loss and possibly hallucinations. Lucille, his parole officer, supplies Marv with medication to control these effects of his condition, though he doesn't seem to be supplied with anything that would curb his violent nature. His personal code of honor dictates the repayment of debts and a sort of chivalry towards women. He is a classic example of a noir anti-hero. Creator Frank Miller describes Marv as "Conan in a trench coat" in the book Sin City: The Making of the Movie. Marv is portrayed by Mickey Rourke in the film adaptation and its sequel.
- Dwight McCarthy, a private investigator-turned-vigilante and a close ally of the Old Town girls. In his first appearance (A Dame to Kill For), Dwight is manipulated by his ex-lover Ava Lord into killing her husband and then betrayed by her, leaving him a wanted murderer. Gail and the Old Town girls surgically reconstructed his face, drastically changing his identity and allowing him to take revenge. He is thus deeply in debt to the women of Old Town and will go to great lengths to aid them, to the point of singlehandedly starting a mob war to avenge a murdered prostitute. Dwight is highly intelligent, a skilled marksman, and an intimidating physical fighter. Elements of Dwight's personality and of the stories which feature him prominently frequently evoke other hardboiled figures common to noir, crime and mystery fiction genres, especially Raymond Chandler's Philip Marlowe character. Dwight is portrayed by Clive Owen in the film adaptation and by Josh Brolin in its sequel.
- Detective John Hartigan, An honest, determined 60-year-old ex-con/ex-cop with a severe heart condition (angina). Hartigan was one of the few honorable cops on the Basin City Police force. On his last night on the job he saved Nancy Callahan from being raped and murdered by Roark Junior when she was 11 years old, only to be framed and imprisoned for the crime himself. He has a distinguishing X-shaped scar on his forehead, which is a tribute to Harry Callahan of the Dirty Harry film series, Miller's inspiration for the character. Portrayed by Bruce Willis in the film adaptation and its sequel.
- Wallace, a fit, long-haired artist-turned-vigilante hero who falls in love with and then rescues Esther from The Colonel's organ-harvesting scheme. He is a former Navy SEAL and was awarded the Medal of Honor. Wallace is portrayed as an unbeatable fighter, though he prefers to avoid fighting whenever possible. Unlike the other Sin City protagonists, especially Marv and Dwight, he has no reluctance to kill a woman; killing Delia and Maxine in cold blood. Until going on a killing spree to save Esther, Wallace seems to be the most law-abiding person in Sin City.
- Goldie and Wendy, beautiful identical twin prostitutes who are in charge of Old Town. Little is known about Goldie, who is killed after learning too much about the Roark family farm at the beginning of The Hard Goodbye, and she is seen mainly through the eyes of Marv, who is stunned when she offers herself to him in exchange for protection and considers her "an angel." Wendy is a tough, hot-tempered leader who is quick to avenge any wrong done to the girls in her care. After she delivers a vicious beating to Marv, who she believes to be her sister's murderer, he notes that Goldie must have been "the nice one." However, once Wendy comes to understand Marv's motives and intentions for his quest, and the lengths he will go to see them through, she softens to him, becoming his helper throughout The Hard Goodbye. Wendy is the last visitor Marv receives before his execution, and she spends the night with him. She tells him that he can call her by her sister's name that last night. They likely make love although that is never shown. After Marv is killed she is never seen without his crucifix around her neck. Goldie and Wendy are portrayed by Jaime King in the film adaptation and its sequel.
- Nancy Callahan, an angelic erotic dancer at Kadie's bar, she is the only character to appear in each of the 7 volumes of Sin City, usually as a silent presence dancing on stage. In "That Yellow Bastard" it is revealed that she was saved by Det. John Hartigan when she was 11 years old (roughly 12 years before The Hard Goodbye) from the murderous pedophile Roark Junior. His actions to protect her in adulthood are the focus of that book. She is also a good friend to Marv, who often doubles as her protector. Portrayed by Jessica Alba (as an adult) and Makenzie Vega (as an 11-year-old girl) in the film adaptation and by Alba in its sequel.
- Gail, a prostitute, dominatrix and one of the leaders of the Old Town community, second only to the Twins. Standing 6 feet tall and wearing an outfit made of a combination of leather, fishnet stockings and metal studs, (and occasionally bondage masks,) she has a love/hate relationship with Dwight McCarthy. Indeed, the reason Dwight is still alive at all is 'that one fiery night when she was mine' and the unrequited love she feels for him; in A Dame to Kill For, when the girls of Old Town are deliberating whether or not to kill Dwight, Gail states that he is the only man she has ever loved, and that if he dies, she wants to die with him. Her preferred weapon is an Uzi submachine gun. Portrayed by Rosario Dawson in the film adaptation and its sequel.
- Miho, often referred to as "Deadly Little Miho" by Dwight, is a highly skilled, incredibly dangerous assassin who serves as an enforcer and defender of Old Town. She never speaks. Among her arsenal are twin katana samurai swords, throwing stars in the shape of a Manji, and a Mongolian-styled longbow. She is often seen on roller blades and is capable of killing several men while skating. She owes a debt of honor to Dwight for saving her life, and he is the only male she interacts with on a friendly basis. Dwight likens her to a cat, in that she uses her swords to "play" with her opponent by dodging her opponent while hitting them in return. She is especially sadistic if the opponent uses anti-Japanese racial slurs. Frank Miller considers the character to be a "supernatural being" of Sin City that characterizes a "good demon." Portrayed by Devon Aoki in the film adaptation and Jamie Chung in its sequel.
- Esther, a depressed, lonely, suicidal actress whom Wallace saves from drowning in Hell and Back, and whose kidnapping sets him on a one-man mission to rescue her.

== Antagonists ==
- Kevin is a mute serial killer who resides at "The Farm", a shadowy retreat owned by the powerful Roark family. Though he is never shown speaking a single word, his erstwhile protector Cardinal Roark claims that he has the voice of an angel. He kills prostitutes, mounts their heads on a wall like hunting trophies, and eats their remains, giving the leftovers to his pet wolf. He is sheltered by Cardinal Roark, to whom he supposedly confessed being tormented by guilt over his crimes. Being close with Cardinal Roark, he is also well known to the family and is good friends with Roark Junior. He appears as a small, shadowy figure with occasionally glowing glasses and razor-sharp fingernails that he uses as weapons. Kevin is preternaturally quick and silent, and ferociously skilled at martial arts. Marv laments that Kevin is the only person to have ever successfully snuck up on him, and is also the only person to beat him in single combat; Marv only defeats Kevin in their rematch by luring him in close and handcuffing himself to Kevin so that Kevin's trademark speed is useless. Despite suffering a gruesome and lingering death by Marv's hands, Kevin does not scream once, staring placidly straight ahead even as his pet wolf begins to eat him. Portrayed by Elijah Wood in the film adaptation.
- Cardinal Patrick Henry Roark, a Catholic Cardinal, is brother to Senator Roark. Roark occasionally uses Kevin (who is akin to a son) as his personal assassin, and even joins him in his cannibalistic rituals. He is killed by Marv in an unspecified (but implied to be extremely gruesome and painful) way. Portrayed by Rutger Hauer in the film adaptation.
- Manute, a huge African American man, typically dressed as a valet, who is very gentlemanly and polite in all situations, even while committing homicide, who served Ava Lord and is later recruited by the Colonel and Wallenquist. He is, like Marv, nearly indestructible, having been crucified (by Miho), shot repeatedly (by Dwight), beat up numerous times (by Marv and Wallace), and relieved of an eye (again, by Marv). Manute is finally gunned down by Old Town hookers during 'The Big Fat Kill'. In the deleted scenes of the film, he was shown to have escaped from the assault by the Old Town girls with Schutz and another thug, only to be sliced in half by Miho in an alley way. Portrayed by Michael Clarke Duncan in the film adaptation and Dennis Haysbert in its sequel.
- Alarich Wallenquist / The Kraut, the mysterious and powerful leader of the Sin City mob. His goal is merely to achieve power and profit, regardless of what underhanded methods can lead him to that goal. Unlike the other antagonists, however, he is somewhat an honorable person, as he sees revenge as an unnecessary extravagance and will often take losses, (such as his enforcers' defeat in The Big Fat Kill and Hell and Back, even the death of Bruno in Family Values,) with a fair amount of dignity. He also proves to be one of the few men able to resist Ava Lord's wiles. Portrayed by Stacy Keach in the sequel.
- Lieutenant Jack "Iron Jack" Rafferty / "Jackie Boy", is Shellie's abusive former boyfriend. Miho kills him and his four buddies after they threaten Becky with a gun. His spirit later haunts Dwight's imagination, and his murder is what precipitates 'the big fat kill' of the title. Despite his blatant alcoholism and abusive behavior towards women, Rafferty is a well-respected hero cop, having ascended to the ranks of Lieutenant. He was given the moniker "Iron Jack" by the newspapers. Portrayed by Benicio del Toro in the film adaptation.
- Ethan Roark Jr. / That Yellow Bastard, is the son of Senator Roark. He is handsome, young, and rich; he is also a sadistic child molester and serial killer who rapes and murders prepubescent girls, a pastime covered up by his father and the Basin City police. In That Yellow Bastard, Hartigan shoots off Junior's left ear, right hand and genitals while rescuing an 11-year-old Nancy Callahan, and Sen. Roark pays millions in physical rehabilitation treatments to rebuild him. Due to these treatments, however, his body cannot process waste properly, resulting in his skin turning bright yellow and making him smell like rotting meat. He finally meets his end twelve years later, when Hartigan stabs him in the gut with a switchblade, castrates him again (this time with his bare hands), and proceeds to pound his head to a pulp. Portrayed by Nick Stahl in the film adaptation.
- Senator Ethan Roark, a corrupt politician with huge political and financial power; he has the influence to eliminate whomever he chooses. He even beat his own wife to death with a baseball bat, leaving his fingerprints all over it, and blackmailed someone else into confessing. His son is Roark Junior. He hushes up Junior's crimes by threatening to kill Hartigan's family if he doesn't confess to the murders Junior committed. The Senator's brother is Cardinal Roark. Portrayed by Powers Boothe in the film adaptation and its sequel.
- The Colonel / The Salesman, also goes by The Man. A shadowy, poetic freelance assassin, allied with both the cops and the Mafia. He trains and co-ordinates assassins, and is one himself at some point. He runs an organ harvesting ring as well as other ventures in organized crime. His operations are eventually shut down by the Basin City Police in a sting operation and he is captured and shot by Commissioner Liebowitz after mouthing off to him. He is also known as "the Salesman", a gentle, poetic hit-man who ensures his target's last moments are happy before he quietly kills them. It is assumed he kills Becky at the end of the movie adaptation. Portrayed by Josh Hartnett in the film adaption.
- Ava Lord, the dame to kill for. An ex-lover of Dwight McCarthy and an expert manipulator and liar. She convinces Dwight to kill her husband Damien, who she claims is abusive, then betrays him. She later manipulates police detective Mort into falling in love with her, eventually leading to his suicide. She is considered a goddess by her servant Manute and a manipulative bitch by Dwight, who eventually kills her. She represents the classic femme fatale, acting as a foil to Dwight's typically hard-boiled but cool-headed anti-hero. Portrayed by Eva Green in the film sequel.
- Delia / Blue Eyes, an assassin trained by The Colonel. Her first job is killing the only man she has ever loved. She uses the powers of seduction to lead unsuspecting men to their deaths and considers her co-worker Mariah to be "sloppy". She usually has sex with her victims before killing them, something The Colonel admonishes her for. She herself is killed by Wallace, despite begging for her life.
- Mariah, a trained assassin in league with Delia, although apparently less skilled. She, too, uses the powers of seduction, but can also fight with a bo (staff), and is stealthy enough to kill a man without waking up the man in bed next to him. She works for Wallenquist. Her nose was broken by Wallace, and she managed to escape from Liebowitz's assault on the factory and request his permission to seek revenge but goes along with his decision not to. Has a penchant for leopard print clothing.
- Maxine, a psychopharmacologist who works alongside Delia. She administers a strong hallucinogen into Wallace's system, and later gives him the antidote at gunpoint. Dies for her troubles. She was also involved in Esther's attempted brainwashing.
- Becky, a young Old Town prostitute who is instrumental in getting Jackie Boy killed by Miho, although it is unclear if she does this on behalf of the other Girls or The Colonel, who she also works for as a spy. Her service to the Colonel is mainly because she didn't want her mother to discover that she was a prostitute, partly because he offered her a considerable sum of money and a new life. She seemingly dies when Old Town girls shoot her in the stomach during the shootout in The Big Fat Kill, but in the movie adaptation, she is only shot in the arm and escapes, only to encounter the Salesman while leaving the hospital, and it is implied he kills her. Portrayed by Alexis Bledel in the film adaptation. She is also among those who watch Wendy torture Marv before the group is persuaded of his innocence.

== Supporting characters ==
- Lucille, Marv's lesbian friend/parole officer and Hartigan's lawyer. Preyed on by Kevin- who makes her watch as he eats her left hand- and afterwards gunned down by police to cover up Cardinal Roark's proclivities with Kevin. Portrayed by Carla Gugino in the film adaptation.
- Shellie, a barmaid at Kadie's and Dwight McCarthy's occasional girlfriend. On the night that John Hartigan found the fully grown Nancy at Kadie's bar, she took a drunk and depressed Dwight back to her place out of pity. She was annoyed with him for not calling her for months during A Dame To Kill For, but helped Gail hide him from the cops. By The Big Fat Kill, they appear to have reconciled and have resumed a casual sexual relationship. While her taste in men leaves something to be desired, she is courageous enough to lie to the cops on Dwight's behalf and verbally defend herself against her abusive boyfriend 'Jackie Boy' when he and four of his friends force their way into her apartment. Portrayed by Brittany Murphy in the film adaptation.
- Kadie, a middle-aged, overweight transsexual that owns the eponymous bar where Nancy and Shellie work. She gives Marv drinks for free because he has killed a number of people for her. Although she has never been seen, she is often mistaken for Josie, an equally plump barmaid who serves drinks there along with Shellie. Next to Nancy and Shellie, Josie is the one who is most affectionate to Marv; when Marv assaults the bouncer during The Hard Goodbye for denying him entrance, she makes excuses for the bouncer: 'He's new here, Marv. He didn't know.' Portrayed by Evelyn Hurley in the film adaptation.
- Douglas Klum and Burt Schlubb / Fat Man and Little Boy, a pair of low-rent hit men with "delusions of eloquence" who use pretentious, pseudo-poetic words (sprinkled with malapropisms) in daily conversation to mask the fact that they're both incredibly stupid and incompetent at their chosen occupation. Real names are Burt Schlubb (Fat Man) and Douglas Klump (Little Boy). Both have been bested in unarmed combat by John Hartigan (twice in That Yellow Bastard) and Dwight McCarthy (The Babe Wore Red) and 'Fat Man' has been menaced by Marv (as a cameo in Silent Night). Their nicknames are references to the atomic bombs dropped on Hiroshima and Nagasaki in World War II. Portrayed by Nick Offerman (Schlubb) and Rick Gomez (Klump) in the film adaptation.
- Detective Bob, Hartigan's partner in That Yellow Bastard who betrays him to the Roarke family. He reappears in A Dame to Kill For, and has a new partner, Mort. He and Mort are the detectives that start looking for Dwight when Ava Lord blames him for being in her house. Later they search and interrogate people who are related to Dwight. Right after he and Mort discover Dwight's whereabouts, Mort is encouraged by Ava Lord to go to Old Town and kill Dwight, but Bob insists he not go there because of the danger. Bob is shot through the head by his partner in the car just when he is about to turn Mort in. In the film adaptation of "That Yellow Bastard", Bob's role is expanded and he is shown to regret betraying Hartigan, picking him up from Prison and giving him his first lead on his search for Nancy. Portrayed by Michael Madsen in the film adaptation and by Jeremy Piven in its sequel.
- Detective Mort, partners with Bob during A Dame to Kill For and an honest detective. Visits Hartigan in the hospital during That Yellow Bastard and tries to get Hartigan to give permission to clear Hartigan's name. Eight years later, picks up Hartigan at the prison after Hartigan's false confession. Seduced and corrupted by Ava Lord, and eventually takes Bob's, and his own, life. Portrayed by Christopher Meloni in the film sequel.

== Others ==
- Marv's Mother, who lives in the Housing Projects of Basin City, where Marv was born and raised. Having gone blind at an unspecified age, her hearing has improved to compensate. She keeps Marv's childhood room spotless, and seems to be unaware of some of his darker nocturnal habits. Portrayed by Lucina Paquet in the film adaptation.
- "Weevil" is a local informant and a regular at Kadie's. Portrayed by Tommy Nix in the film adaptation and Johnny Reno in its sequel.
- Stan, hitman who tries to bring Marv in. After taking a shot in the belly and the groin, he surrenders the identity of his benefactor, only to be killed and robbed of his "damn fine coat". Portrayed by Jason Douglas in the film adaptation.
- Padre, a priest who is the final link in the chain of people who attempted to put a hit out on Marv. He reveals that it was on the orders of Cardinal Roark, at which Marv initially scoffs. The Priest instructs him to investigate the Roark farm, and to ask himself if the corpse of a slut (Goldie) was worth dying for. Marv puts three bullets in his face, reiterating that she was "worth dying for. Worth killing for. Worth going to Hell for." Portrayed by series creator Frank Miller in the film adaptation.
- "The Painted Cop", a police captain with tribal tattoos on his face, who arrives at the farm with a squad of armed police to kill or capture Marv. When Lucille subdued Marv and attempted to surrender him so that he would not get anyone else killed, she was fatally sprayed with automatic fire for her trouble by the Painted Cop. After Marv wiped out the entire squad in vengeance and faced off against the ammo-less Painted Cop, it is assumed, if not virtually explicit, that Marv interrogates him (he talked after Marv showed him "all those pieces of himself",) then murders him with a hatchet and takes possession of his "damn fine coat". Marv also reveals that he "took his time" with him in revenge for his killing of Lucille. Portrayed by Ryan Rutledge in the film adaptation.
- Corporal Rivera, a hapless perimeter guard at the Cardinal's mission. Has his neck snapped by Marv. Portrayed by Jesse De Luna in the film adaptation.
- "Juicer", the prison warden in charge of Marv's execution. Portrayed by David H. Hickey in the film adaptation.
- Joey, a businessman going through an awkward marriage with a woman called Gloria and is resentful of people he believes are holding him back. He is also the subject of a private investigation job handed to Dwight. After he has his fun and provided plenty of photographic evidence, he is beaten by Dwight after threatening his mistress with a gun. Portrayed by Ray Liotta in the film sequel.
- Sally, an Old Town girl and Joey's mistress, who tries to kill her to cover-up his infidelity. Luckily Dwight, who was photographing him, smashes through a window and saves her. Portrayed by Juno Temple in the film sequel.
- Agamemnon, is a sort-of friend to Dwight, who gives Dwight photography jobs related to private investigation and lets him use his darkroom. Gets Dwight out of jams in exchange for food. Often seen wearing a "Kiss Me, I'm Greek" shirt. Most of his sentences end with, "I tell ya, I could write a book ..."
- Damien Lord, Ava's rich husband whom she left Dwight for. Whilst it is never clear how he came to be a millionaire, it is assumed it is extra-legal. The primary victim of Ava's schemes, and seems to be rather aware of her pathological nature. Portrayed by Marton Csokas in the film sequel.
- Molly, an Old Town girl who is also seemingly a doctor. She saved Dwight's life, at Gail's insistence, when he was seriously wounded by Ava Lord.
- Kelley, Sandy and Denise, a group of Old Town girls who were victims of a group of white slavers led by a man named Manuel. Though their fate was never revealed, Dwight presumably made sure their captors were dealt with accordingly.
- "Cowboy", a macho customer of Wendy's who has a penchant for "carving up" women with a large hunting knife. Needless to say, he gets what was coming to him, courtesy of Miho.
- "The Customer", a beautiful young woman and one of the many targets of the Salesman. Seemingly hired the Salesman to kill her, although he never found out whom or what she was running from. Portrayed by Marley Shelton in the film adaptation.
- Mary, the babe (who) wore red, who gets herself caught in a middle of a botched drug exchange and was then made a target of Fat Man and Little Boy, until Dwight saved her. Afterward, she becomes a nun.
- Kimberly, the little girl Marv saves in Silent Night. Held captive and was most likely going to be sold for sex, until Marv saved her at her mother's behest.
- The "Troops", Jackie Boy's gang who go with him on his ill-fated night out. All are just as drunk as Jack and think nothing of egging him on, no matter how much trouble it will cause. They are the first to be dispatched by Miho when Jack does "the dumbest thing in (his) whole life". Portrayed by Ethan Maniquis, Ken Thomas, Chris Warner and Iman Nazemzadeh in the film adaptation.
- Murphy, Maeve, Ronnie and Brian, a group of Irish mercenaries who are hired by Manute to recover Jackie Boy's head and kill Dwight McCarthy. Murphy (the group's leader) and Maeve are shot by Dwight McCarthy, and Ronnie has his head cut in half with a throwing star by Miho. Brian, the group's demolitions expert, was also killed by Miho after getting the drop on Dwight in the sewer. Portrayed by Arie Verveen (Murphy), Helen Kirk (Maeve), Jason McDonald (Ronnie) and Tommy Flanagan (Brian) in the film adaptation.
- Dallas, Old Town girl and Miho's driver. Gunned down by mercenaries. In the film adaptation, she is played by Patricia Vonne, Robert Rodriguez's sister and the same actress who plays Zorro Girl, an Old Town girl who dresses in a similar fashion to Zorro.
- Stuka, a wisecracking—and extremely durable—henchman of Manute's who has a swastika tattooed on his forehead. Miho shoots him twice with arrows in The Big Fat Kill; the first arrow goes completely through his torso but his only reaction is one of bemusement, although he does eventually admit "...it's starting to hurt a little now ... d'you think I should see a doctor?" He is killed by a second arrow (In the film, the second arrow goes through the back of his head, and pierces right through the swastika in his forehead; in the book, the second arrow goes through his neck). Portrayed by Nicky Katt in the film adaptation.
- Schutz, another of Manute's henchmen. He dies in The Big Fat Kill. Portrayed by Clark Middleton in the film adaptation.
- Davis, Works for Wallenquist and specializes in torturing people. Is particularly skillful at inflicting pain with the use of his hands, without the necessity of any tools. He is killed in "the big fat kill". He does not appear in the film and his role as torturer is taken by Manute.
- Lenny and Benny, twins who acted as hired muscle for Junior before his disfigurement by Hartigan. They are dispatched by Hartigan with ease. Portrayed by Scott Teeters in the film adaptation.
- Eileen, John Hartigan's wife. She only appears once, at the hospital, pleading with him to tell her that Senator Roark's cover-up is not true. She leaves, presumably gets divorced in the interim, and by the time of Hartigan's release eight years later, she has remarried and had two children. Portrayed by Babs George in the film adaptation.
- One of Hartigan's lawyers, referred to in the film as "Skinny Dude". His overall view of the case is far from optimistic. Portrayed by Marco Perella in the film adaptation.
- Commissioner Liebowitz, Commissioner of the Basin City Police Department. Brutally beats Hartigan upon his arrival in prison, and later takes bribes from The Colonel in Hell and Back. After his family is threatened, Liebowitz finally kills The Colonel and shuts down Wallenquist's human-trafficking operations. In the Long Bad Night segment original to the second movie, Liebowitz plays poker with Senator Roark and tries to warn off a young man bent on making Roark mad at him (although he does not stop Roark from killing the young man later on). Portrayed by Jude Ciccolella in the film adaptation and its sequel.
- Tammy, an Old Town "nurse" whom Liebowitz uses to taunt and torture Hartigan. Portrayed by Lisa Marie Newmyer in the film adaptation.
- Claire, Lucille's girlfriend who is first mentioned in The Hard Goodbye; she is not seen until That Yellow Bastard, and even then only fleetingly. She is a psychiatrist who provides Marv, via Lucille, with the pills he takes to control his "condition". According to Marv, she tried to analyze him once, but "got too scared".
- Johnny, a middle-aged man who falls in love with a sweet girl named Amy, and in order to finally be with her, he must kill her controlling father. Unfortunately, he falls victim to Amy and "Daddy's" sick sexual role-playing.
- Amy and Daddy; Amy seduces Johnny and convinces him to kill her "father", so that they can be happy together. Johnny is lured into Amy's sick trap, as "Daddy" is really her lover, and Amy's victims are used to get a rise out of "Daddy".
- Jim, a deep-thinking man and a former lover of Delia. As "the only man she has ever loved," he is killed by Delia as part of her initiation by the Colonel.
- The War Criminal, an emaciated, insane Nazi war criminal who survives on dog food and rats he kills in his gas oven. He participated in the Holocaust, and is murdered by The Janitor, a mysterious mercenary and possible Nazi hunter, who kills him the same way he kills the rats.
- Phil, a used car salesman. Mistaken for Eddie by Delia and killed (after she has sex with him). Delia is shocked to discover that Phil has murdered his wife Donna and hidden her body in the trunk of his car.
- Eddie Dubois, Delia's real target, who sold stolen jewelry without giving Wallenquist a cut of the profits. He avoids Delia's initial ambush due to a flat tire. Delia catches up to him on a train and kills him—after having sex with him, of course.
- Peggy, a single mother who hangs out in bars tempting men into buying her drinks, as she is an alcoholic and is frequently denied more drinks. A valuable source of info to Dwight in Family Values.
- Otto, the bartender of the diner in which Peggy hangs out.
- Bruno, a politician on Wallenquist's payroll. His murder at the hands of the Mafia, and the collateral damage that ensued, set Dwight on a mission to find his murderer.
- Vito, a Mafia mobster who kills Bruno and (accidentally) Carmen in Family Values. Forced to shoot his brother Luca. He is forced to drive Dwight and Miho to the home of his uncle, Don Giacco Magliozzi and is presumedly killed by Daisy.
- Spinelli, short Mafia muscle. Wears a hooded coat similar to a slicker. The first of Vito's thugs to be killed by Miho.
- Luca, Vito's brother and one of Magliozzi's hitmen. Dwight and Miho force Vito to shoot him.
- Vinnie, Mafia muscle. Incredibly racially bigoted, especially towards Japanese.
- Don Giacco Magliozzi, Leader of the local Mafia, residing in Sacred Oaks. Enemies with Wallenquist. Killed by Daisy at the conclusion of Family Values.
- Carmen, Old Town girl with a rough past; lesbian lover of Daisy. Unintentionally gunned down in the Magliozzi hit on Bruno, which sparks Dwight, Daisy and Miho's bloody vengeance on the Magliozzi family.
- Daisy, Carmen's lesbian lover. Avenges her death by killing the remaining Magliozzi family members.
- Dr. Fredric, a doctor in league with the Colonel. Kidnaps and overpowers Esther under the Colonel's orders after incapacitating Wallace with narcotics in Hell and Back. Mariah kills him and his companion, Orrin, to make sure that Wallace does not extract any valuable information from him.
- Orrin, Doctor Fredric's assistant and lover. Shoots and incapacitates Wallace with a strong tranquilliser whilst he and Fredric abduct Esther. Mariah kills him before killing Doctor Fredric.
- Manson and Bundy, two corrupt police officers, named after Charles Manson and Ted Bundy. They pick on a drugged Wallace, who in turn beats them and two other cops up with relative ease once he managed to flush the tranquilliser from his system. It would seem Manson is a post-operative female-to-male transsexual, as he claims he has not been a woman in nine years; consequently he takes any suggestion that he is not masculine, deliberate or otherwise, very personally. Bundy, whilst seeing Manson's over-the-top brutality as "harsh", does nothing to control his partner. They and the two other cops were shot and killed by Captain when he rescues a hallucinating Wallace from a frame-up masterminded by the Colonel's subordinate
- Captain, a loyal war buddy of Wallace's. Aids him in saving Esther, first by supplying him with his "heap", then by helping a hallucinating Wallace to snap out of his drugged state to catch up with Delia and Maxine, giving his life in the process during a gun battle with Gordo.
- Jerry, Captain's lover and a fellow war veteran. Good with missiles, but Wallace considers him a bad choice for missions requiring stealth. Agrees to help Wallace rescue Esther after Wallace assured him the Captain has not died in vain.
- Gordo, The Colonel's muscle. Works alongside Delia to try and set-up Wallace's death. Very dumb, and speaks and thinks in third-person. Was killed by Wallace after he mortally shot Captain.
- Josh Liebowitz, Liebowitz's son. He is lured away from his high school with the promise of sex by Mariah. She then breaks his arm, under orders from the Colonel, in an effort to remind Liebowitz of their power over him. The assault on Josh has the opposite effect and is the cause for Liebowitz's rejection of his corruption. Has a younger teenage sister, Hannah.
- Fargo, A friend of Dwight's who was murdered. He was later revealed to be into drug related activities and left a package for Dwight before he died.
- Mrs Mendoza, Wallace's land lady who is a retired nurse. She carries a snub nosed revolver and does not ask Wallace for the rent.
- Gabriel, a frequently-mentioned Star player for the Basin City Blues basketball team.

== Film series ==
Key
- A ^{Y} indicates the actor or actress portrayed the role of a younger version of their character.
- A ^{V} indicates the actor or actress lent only their voice for their character.
- A ^{C} indicates the actor or actress appeared only in a cameo appearance.
- A ^{P} indicates the actor or actress appeared only in photographic form.
- An ^{A} indicates an appearance through archival footage.
- A dark gray cell indicates the character was not in the film.

Character	Films		
Character	Frank Miller's Sin City	Frank Miller's Sin City 2: A Dame to Kill For	Frank Miller's Sin City 3: Hell and Back
Character	2005	2014	TBA
Nancy Callahan	Jessica Alba	Jessica Alba	Jessica Alba
Nancy Callahan	Makenzie Vega^{Y}	Makenzie Vega^{YP}	TBA
Dwight McCarthy	Clive Owen	Josh Brolin	Josh Brolin
Gail	Rosario Dawson	Rosario Dawson	Rosario Dawson
Marv Bernini Boy	Mickey Rourke	Mickey Rourke	TBA
Senator Ethan Roark	Powers Boothe	Powers Boothe	TBA
Detective John Hartigan	Bruce Willis	Bruce Willis	TBA
Miho	Devon Aoki	Jamie Chung	TBA
Manute	Michael Clarke Duncan	Dennis Haysbert	TBA
Detective Bob	Michael Madsen	Jeremy Piven	TBA
Detective Mort	Ron Hayden	Christopher Meloni	TBA
Wendy	Jaime King	Jaime King	TBA
Goldie	Jaime King	Jaime King	TBA
Dallas	Patricia Vonne	Patricia Vonne	TBA
Joey	Ray Liotta	Ray Liotta	TBA
Ethan Roark Jr. The Yellow Bastard	Nick Stahl	Nick Stahl^{AP}	TBA
Father Sam	Frank Miller	Frank Miller	TBA
SWAT Team Member, Sam's Friend	Robert Rodriguez	Robert Rodriguez	TBA
Kevin	Elijah Wood		TBA
Lieutenant Jack "Iron Jack" Rafferty / "Jackie Boy"	Benicio del Toro		TBA
Becky	Alexis Bledel		TBA
Cardinal Patrick Henry Roark	Rutger Hauer		TBA
"The Salesman"	Josh Hartnett		TBA
"The Customer"	Marley Shelton		TBA
Douglas Klump	Rick Gomez		TBA
Lucille	Carla Gugino		TBA
Shellie	Brittany Murphy		TBA
Burt Schlubb	Nick Offerman		TBA
Stan	Jason Douglas		TBA
Ava Lord		Eva Green	TBA
Johnny		Joseph Gordon-Levitt	TBA
Alarich Wallenquist		Stacy Keach	TBA
Dr. Kroenig		Christopher Lloyd	TBA
Sally		Juno Temple	TBA
Marcie		Julia Garner	TBA
Bertha		Lady Gaga	TBA
Gilda		Alexa Vega	TBA
Wallace			Johnny Depp

=== Original characters ===
- Johnny, Senator Roark's illegitimate son. Portrayed by Joseph Gordon-Levitt.

== See also ==
Characters

- Nancy Callahan
- John Hartigan
- Ava Lord
- Marv
- Dwight McCarthy

Other

- Sin City (film)
- Sin City: A Dame to Kill For
