= Miho (Sin City) =

- Sin City character
- First appearance: A Dame to Kill For (1993)
- Created by: Frank Miller
- Portrayed by: Devon Aoki (first film); Jamie Chung (second film)
- Publisher: Dark Horse Comics

In-universe information
- Gender: Female
- Affiliation(s): Dwight McCarthy; Old Town
- Residence: Basin City

Miho (ミホ) is a character in Frank Miller's Sin City graphic novel series. In the film adaptation of Sin City, she is portrayed by Devon Aoki. Jamie Chung replaces Aoki in the 2014 expansion, Sin City: A Dame to Kill For. An expert of martial arts, she is described as a teen ninja who never speaks and is often referred to as Little Miho.

== Character ==
Miho is a mute female assassin of Japanese descent (Miho is offended by anti-Japanese racial slurs, such as "Jap slut" and "Jap slag"; in response, she behaves in an even more sadistic way than she normally does). Along with Gail, she serves as an enforcer and defender of the city's Old Town. She is often referred to as "Deadly Little Miho" by the character Dwight McCarthy in his narrations. Despite residing in Old Town, there is nothing to suggest that she herself is a prostitute (contrary to the opinion expressed by some film critics such as Andrew Sarris and Ty Burr, as well as by IGN).

Miho is very small and light; she has long dark hair, a very slim figure, and dark eyes. Normally she dresses in a short, modified black kimono worn over a bra, and a belt into which she tucks all sorts of weapons. A wakizashi is sometimes shown hanging from her belt. In Family Values, her appearance changes drastically. She is drawn only with white and her body is devoid of shading (including her dark hair).

Miho uses Japanese swords of various sizes, and shuriken in the shape of the manji, as seen in The Big Fat Kill and Family Values. She is also skilled with the longbow and has various other small weaponry tucked in her clothing. She utilizes a wide array of weapons, such as katana, wakizashi and kusarigama. On the DVD commentary track for the film, Quentin Tarantino states that after he suggested that Miho's swords were made by Hattori Hanzō, writer/director Frank Miller enthusiastically agreed.

Much of Miho's past remains a mystery. Three years before the events of A Dame To Kill For, she was saved by Dwight during an attack by Tong gangsters. As Dwight himself explains to Goldie and Wendy, "three of the Tong who attacked Miho were dead by her hand. But the last two had her dead to rights. Point blank range." Because of this incident, she owes a debt of honor to Dwight. Subsequently, Dwight is the only male character she is ever shown to have any non-lethal interaction with, even taking orders from him at one point. They have some sort of friendship, as he is also the only character she ever shows any physical attraction or affection towards.

In a fight Miho typically uses her swords to "play" with her opponent (in Family Values Dwight likens her to a cat), often dodging her opponent's blows while hitting him/her (with seeming ease) in return. She would appear to be a modern-day master of traditional ninjutsu as she tends to rely on stealth, evasion, and counterattacks more than directly engaging an opponent. This puts to good use her acrobatic/gymnastic ability and knowledge of pressure points, veins, and arteries. She is also sometimes seen using roller-skates to get around, much as Carrie Kelley did as Catgirl in Batman: The Dark Knight Strikes Again, which was also written by Frank Miller.

Frank Miller has stated in the Sin City: Recut and Extended DVD commentary that Kevin and Miho are the supernatural beings in Sin City. Miller characterizes them as "demons"; Miho is a good "demon" and Kevin is an evil one. They share many similarities: neither ever speaks, nor is seen with mouth opened. They are the most skilled characters in martial arts (though they never fought Wallace), and never show any sign of pain. So far, Miho was never been shown seriously injured and defeated all her opponents with relative ease, although Dwight stated in A Dame to Kill For that he rescued her from a hopeless situation with Asian Tong gangsters.

== Appearances ==
Miho has appeared in four of the Sin City yarns (aside from the film adaptations):

- A Dame to Kill For (1993) - After Dwight is shot multiple times and he discovers Ava Lord has been manipulating him to commit murder, he flees to Old Town. He seeks refuge from Gail, and in order to gain the help of the Girls of Old Town, he tells the story of saving Miho's life from Tong gangsters. As according to honor, the girls are obligated to help him in his plan for revenge. Miho is instrumental during the fight with Manute at Ava Lord's estate, stopping him from reaching Dwight and crucifying him through the arms with her twin swords. This leads Manute to have a great disdain for the Old Town girls.
- The Big Fat Kill (1994-1995) - Miho is responsible for incapacitating and murdering Jackie Boy when he attempts to kidnap one of the Old Town girls. After Dwight discovers that Jackie Boy is a police officer, he attempts to prevent a war between the Old Town girls and the police by disposing of the body in the tar pits. Upon arrival, he is attacked by Irish mercenaries sent by Wallenquist, who steal Jackie Boy's severed head and leave Dwight to drown in the tar pits. As Dwight sinks beneath the surface of the pits, Miho dives in and rescues him.
- The Babe Wore Red and Other Stories (1994)
- Family Values (1997) - Miho and Dwight get involved in a mob war between the families of Don Magliozzi and Boss Wallenquist, after being told about a recent mob hit. Dwight is soon kidnapped by Vito, who is the nephew of Magliozzi, and is driven toward the Projects. Unknown to the hitmen is that Miho has been following Dwight to make sure that he is protected. Upon mention, Miho kills Spinelli, one of the goons, and they park in a hilltop rest area, overlooking the Projects. There, Miho "toys" with Vinnie, a hitman who spends the whole fight hurling slurs at her, as Dwight tells Vito to kill the other hitman, which is Vito's own brother Luca. After Miho and Dwight are through, they head straight to Sacred Oaks to confront Don Magliozzi, driven by Vito. Miho simply cuts through the guards and Dwight makes his appearance. He tells the Don he is going to die along with Vito for the accidental death of Carmen, one of the Old Town girls.

She was also supposed to appear in the video game adaptation of Sin City, which was canceled in 2008. An action figure based on the first film's version of the character was released by NECA.

== Reception ==
In 2011, UGO Networks featured Miho in their list of "25 Hot Ninja Girls" and together with Kevin at #1 in "Quiet as the Grave: The Silent Killers of Film and TV".

The character is noted as "pixie-like" and capable of "saving the occasional man (on behalf of the women who need him)", according to Dominique Mainon and James Ursini, who recall that Miller loved drawing the character and insisted that she was one of the rare ones in the book that does not talk a lot. The same authors found she was "superbly portrayed" by Aoki.

The character was noted for being "a non-speaking" one. A fact that likens her to Kevin. The fact that she does not speak made other commentators think that she "represents an ultraviolent, sword-wielding Amazon of Japanese origin who doesn't speak, i.e., who is possibly mute."

Miho is also noted for being the "most deadly woman in the city" and even "perhaps the most deadly person in the film". Samantha Lindop called her "a lethal ninja [who] has a compassionate side." George Larke Shaw wrote she is one the characters who exemplify the way the figure of the assassin has crossed gender boundaries in recent years, leading to the hit-girl type, and more specifically to the "girl assassin or teen ninja". Best Life listed her among the Most erotic executioners on the big screen". Kwai-Cheung Lo considered those characters including Miho, are modeled after female Hong Kong action heroes.

The fact that her ethnicity is clearly Asian is also noted, especially in the context of Neo-noir fiction. The character has been compared to Elektra but Véronique Sina considers that her graphic treatment and ethnicity could be an expression of the long-time interest of Miller in manga.

In the economy of the fiction, she functions as "[Dwight's] guide through a world he rarely gets to see" In an interview, Miller stated that although she had been conceived "originally [as] a background character", Miho had proved such a "scene-stealer" and "so fun to draw" that she eventually "grabb[ed] full pages and t[ook] most of the action".
