= Dwight McCarthy =

Fictional character in Sin City

- Sin City character
- Clive Owen as Dwight McCarthy in Sin City
- First appearance: A Dame to Kill For
- Created by: Frank Miller
- Portrayed by: Clive Owen (first film); Josh Brolin (second film)
- Publisher: Dark Horse Comics
- Josh Brolin as Dwight McCarthy in Sin City: A Dame to Kill For

In-universe information
- Full name: Dwight McCarthy
- Gender: Male
- Affiliation(s): The Girls of Old Town; Marv
- Residence: Basin City

Dwight McCarthy is one of the principal characters in Frank Miller's Sin City universe. He appears in A Dame to Kill For, The Big Fat Kill, Family Values, The Babe Wore Red and That Yellow Bastard. He is the character that appears the most in all the Sin City yarns. He was portrayed by Clive Owen in the 2005 film, and by Josh Brolin in the 2014 prequel.

== Appearance ==
In Dwight's first appearance in A Dame to Kill For, his head is shaved and he is nearing middle age. During the events of A Dame to Kill For, the Old Town girls perform facial reconstruction on him at Gail's behest after he suffers horrendous injuries. They change his facial appearance dramatically, and he allows his hair to grow again as well. By his next appearances in The Big Fat Kill and Family Values, he sports a more natural look.

In terms of clothing, in the first half of A Dame to Kill For he wears just a shirt and pants. Afterwards, he takes to wearing a black shirt and a trench coat. He wears red Converse sneakers both before and after his transformation; shown in color on the cover of The Big Fat Kill #1 and in the movie adaptation.

== Character history ==
Three years before A Dame to Kill For, Dwight rescues Miho from two Tong gangsters.

In the time span of That Yellow Bastard, Ava Lord leaves Dwight and marries another man. In That Yellow Bastard, it is on the night John Hartigan enters Kadie's that a drunk Dwight, after whining about Ava leaving him a month ago, goes home with Shellie and sleeps with her.

Prior to his first chronological appearance in A Dame to Kill For, Dwight worked for a time as a talented photographer for a Basin City newspaper. However, he was prone to reckless and violent behavior, further aggravated by alcoholism, which cost him his job. After getting sober and curbing his aggressive tendencies, he found work as a seedy private investigator, often taking pictures of adulterous men.

=== A Dame to Kill For ===
Dwight as he first appears in A Dame To Kill For.

Dwight sporting a new face courtesy of the Old Town girls later on in A Dame To Kill For

As the story begins, Dwight is struggling with maintaining a clean and safe lifestyle, as he is constantly enticed to revert to his previous, reckless ways. Ava Lord contacts Dwight and asks to meet at a seedy bar. Though it has been about four years since they last saw each other, Dwight is still embittered by her leaving him. Manute interrupts their meeting just as Ava mentions she might die soon. The next night, Dwight goes to Damien Lord's estate to check on her; however, Manute attacks and beats Dwight brutally. By the time Dwight makes it back to his apartment, Ava is there, where they sleep together after a nasty argument. Just as Manute shows up, Ava tells him she's being tortured by Manute and Damien. Dwight tries to fight him off, but gets thrown out of his apartment's window. On the street, Dwight sees Ava's frightened face as Manute's car drives past and Dwight finally snaps, reverting to his previously dangerous and violent behavior. Fearing for Ava's safety, he goes to Kadie's and recruits help from Marv, the neighborhood bruiser. Shellie lectures Dwight at having not seen nor heard from him in six months. Upon arriving at Damien's estate, Marv causes a commotion and distracts the security while Dwight looks for Damien. Marv fights Manute and takes out his right eye.

Dwight kills Damien in a struggle, and learns that Ava tricked him into doing so; she shoots him in the face and he falls out yet another window. Marv hears the gunshots, picks up Dwight's body and leaves the estate. In their getaway car, Dwight, barely alive, tells Marv to take him to Old Town. When an old flame, Gail, hears Dwight's voice and sees what has happened to his face, she begins to rehabilitate Dwight. After he has healed, Gail, Dwight, Miho and Shellie develop a plan to get revenge on Ava Lord. Gail and the others tell Shellie that Dwight is still alive, and brief her on what she should tell the cops. Ava, having inherited her late husband's fortune, joins forces with mob boss Wallenquist. Dwight, Miho, and Gail get into Ava Lord's estate. They encounter Manute, who, despite being shot six times by Dwight and crucified by Miho, manages to stay alive. Dwight, after listening to Ava's last, desperate lie, finally kills her.

=== The Big Fat Kill ===
Dwight in The Big Fat Kill. His face is now completely redone.

Dwight, sporting an improved face, is at Shellie's place when Jack Rafferty (otherwise known as Jackie-Boy) and his friends arrive to harass Shellie. Dwight 'talks' with Jackie-Boy in the bathroom — he threatens him with a razor and plunges his head into the toilet that Jackie-Boy has just urinated in — and scares him off. They leave Shellie's apartment, but Dwight follows them for fear that they might hurt another woman that night. Dwight follows them straight to Old Town, where Miho slaughters Jackie-Boy and his friends for threatening one of the Old Town girls. Dwight then discovers that Jack was in fact a Detective Lieutenant whom the papers call "Iron Jack". Dwight, in an attempt to prevent a costly war between the Old Town girls and the police, tries to dispose of Jackie-Boy's body in the tar pits. However, some Irish mercenaries that Wallenquist has sent shoot him. Dwight survives only because Jackie-Boy's badge blocked a bullet. He kills the assassins, but is attacked by more of them. He lands in the tar pits while the others cut off Jackie-Boy's head. Dwight sinks into the tar and prays to God not to let him die. Miraculously, he sees Miho swimming towards him. He pleas with her silently to save herself. However, Miho pulls him with her foot attached to a chain at the back of a car and she drags him just in time from the pits. Dallas, who was driving the car, announces that Gail has been kidnapped. Though the other mercenaries have left with Jackie-Boy's head, Miho has left one member of the gang alive, and Dwight tortures him for information. The Old Town girl that Jackie-Boy had his eyes on, Becky, sells them out to Wallenquist in an attempt to make money and get out of the prostitution game — this is how the Irish assassins knew where to ambush Dwight. Manute had captured Gail, when suddenly Miho fires an arrow with a deal attached: Jackie-Boy's head for Gail's life. The trade takes place in a narrow alley, and Dwight takes advantage of this to ambush Manute and his entourage. The Old Town girls, firing from the rooftops, leave no one alive.

=== Family Values ===
Dwight is on a mission from Gail to dig up information about a recent mob hit at a small diner. He goes into a bar near where the hit happened and tries to charm one of the local drinkers there named Peggy. Dwight also spots Fat Man and Little Boy, which makes his job easier later on. As Dwight keeps charming Peggy, she realizes he's not interested in any company that night and only looking for information behind the recent hit. It's revealed that Bruno, the target, was killed by Vito, one of Don Magliozzi's nephews and also one of his hitmen. This was done in retaliation on Don Magliozzi's part as Bruno had killed his beloved niece years ago. Going against his family's treaty with Mob Boss Wallenquist, Magliozzi orders Vito to kill Bruno, who is on Wallenquist's payroll, immediately. Afterwards, everyone's nervous about what Wallenquist will do and if there will be a mob war. With that information, Dwight leaves the bar and is confronted by Vito and some other hitmen who came when Fat Man and Little Boy alerted them someone was digging around for information.

Dwight is kidnapped by them and driven toward the Projects, but Dwight is more interested in their car, which he claims he will take possession of once they're all dead; none of them believe him. Unknown to the hitmen is that Miho has been following Dwight for protection. On the way, Vito tells his side of the story as to how he killed every living thing he saw, including a stray dog. Dwight is satisfied with this and orders Miho to make her appearance. She kills Spinelli, one of the goons, and they park in a hilltop rest area, overlooking the Projects. There, Miho toys with one of the hitmen as Dwight tells Vito to kill the other hitman, Vito's own brother Luca.

After Miho and Dwight are through, they head straight to Sacred Oaks to confront Don Magliozzi, driven by Vito. Miho cuts through the guards and Dwight makes his appearance. He tells the Don he is going to die along with Vito for the accidental death of Carmen, one of the Old Town girls. Dwight tells them Vito shouldn't have shot at the stray dog, since the angles were in a straight line to where Carmen was calling for a ride when Vito shot her. Carmen's lesbian lover, Daisy, arrives as Dwight walks away from the Don and his associates. Daisy guns them down as Dwight remarks there's going to be a mob war because of this, but that neither he nor the girls of Old Town will have cause to worry about it. Finally, he takes possession of Vito's car and drives off into the night.

=== Hell and Back ===
On page 165 of Hell and Back, Dwight is clearly seen driving his car next to Wallace and Delia.

== Personality ==
Dwight is first introduced as a man who lives in total abstinence in order to keep out of trouble. Having a history of bad tempers, wild drinking, and wild love affairs (as well as a mysterious, but seemingly significant, incident involving his father, briefly mentioned in A Dame to Kill For) he lives completely denying himself even a taste of what he refers to as "the fire". During this time he appears to be a tortured soul who is afraid even to rev the engine of his Mustang or grow his hair, all the while trying to not 'let the monster out.'

After being duped and betrayed by Ava Lord in A Dame to Kill For, he develops a new, nihilistic outlook on life. After killing Damien Lord, he constantly refers to himself as a dead man, hinting that he no longer lives the life he had prior to Ava's reappearance. The new Dwight, possibly the 'monster' he had tried to restrain, is far more confident in his self-worth and more at ease with allowing himself to indulge in pleasures and whims. There are times when this new Dwight is shown as being insane or at least not all there, most likely a result of Ava's influence and betrayal, it is most notable during the conversation between himself and the recently deceased Jackie Boy. Dwight also appears completely aware of his problems.

At all times Dwight is a model of chivalry, treating all women, especially the prostitutes of Old Town, with the utmost respect and offering them his protection. His passion for romance runs deep and a woman in need of help is the trigger for his involvement in all the stories in which he stars. Miller, on the special 2-Disc Sin City DVD has stated he is the story's "everyman": Rather than an anti-hero like Marv or a folk hero like John Hartigan, Dwight is simply someone who tries to do the right thing and find his place in the world. He also, in explaining the character to actor Clive Owen, described Dwight as a modern iteration of Philip Marlowe.

== Interpretation and reception ==
The character is one of the major protagonists of the series.

Kovacs and Marshall compared the character to that of Leonidas, both in Miller's and Plutarch's depictions. "“I like that (Dwight) is so multifaceted,” Brolin said. “The minute you make the decision that he is brutish and hypercool and exaggerated like a simian man, suddenly you see all the cracks and the weaknesses."

Harold Hellwig noted: "characters in Sin City (Marv, Hartigan, Dwight, among other lesser figures) attempt to save others while losing or almost losing their lives (Frank Miller says that Dwight is a Philip Marlowe character), all acting as chameleons in order to survive".
