= Family Values (comics) =

1997 graphic novel by Frank Miller

- Date: October 1997
- Page count: 128 pages
- Publisher: Dark Horse Comics

Creative team
- Writers: Frank Miller
- Artists: Frank Miller
- ISBN: 159307297X

Family Values is a graphic novel, and the fifth "yarn" in Frank Miller's Sin City series. It was first published in October 1997. Unlike the previous four stories, Family Values was released as a 128-page graphic novel rather than in serialized issues that would later be collected in a trade paperback volume.

== Plot ==
Dwight McCarthy is on a mission from Gail to dig up information about a recent mob hit at a small diner. After being hit on by a female cop (whom he manages to get rid of by pretending to be a bisexual masochist), he goes into a bar near where the hit happened and tries to charm one of the local drinkers there named Peggy.

Dwight also spots Fat Man and Little Boy, which makes his job easier later on. As Dwight keeps charming Peggy, she realizes he's not interested in any company that night and only looking for information behind the recent hit. She reveals that Bruno, the target, was killed by Vito, one of Don Magliozzi's nephews and hitmen. Don Magliozzi ordered the hit on Bruno, who murdered his beloved niece years before. This went against his family's treaty with mob boss Wallenquist, who had Bruno on his payroll. With that information, Dwight leaves the bar, to be confronted by Vito and some other Magliozzi hitmen, alerted by Fat Man and Little Boy.

The thugs kidnap Dwight, but he is more interested in Vito's car, swearing that it will be his once he kills all of them. Uninterested, Vito brags about killing every living thing at the diner, including a stray dog. Dwight then tells Miho, who has been following them, to strike; she kills Spinelli. They park in a hilltop rest area, overlooking the Projects. There, Miho toys with one of the hitmen as Dwight tells Vito to kill the other hitman; Vito's own brother Luca. After Miho and Dwight are through, they head straight to Sacred Oaks to confront Don Magliozzi.

As Miho massacres the guards, Dwight tells the Don he is going to die along with Vito, and reveals why: the accidental death of Carmen, one of the Old Town girls. Dwight tells them Vito shouldn't have shot at the stray dog, since the angles were in a straight line to a nearby phone booth where Carmen was calling for a ride. Carmen was killed by the gunfire. Carmen's lover, Daisy, arrives as Dwight walks away from the Don and his associates, and guns them down. Dwight remarks that the massacre will result in a mob war, but that neither he nor the girls of Old Town will have cause to worry about it. Finally, he takes possession of Vito's car and drives off into the night.

== Characters ==
- Dwight McCarthy, a criminal who takes it upon himself to take on the Magliozzi clan to avenge Carmen's death. He is also the protagonist of The Big Fat Kill, A Dame to Kill For and The Babe Wore Red, and appears in That Yellow Bastard.
- Miho, one of Old Town's prostitutes who is also a ninja assassin. She too appears in The Big Fat Kill and The Babe Wore Red.
- Vito, a mobster who kills Bruno and (accidentally) Carmen in Family Values. Forced to shoot his brother Lucca. Drives Dwight and Miho to the home of his uncle, Don Giacco Magliozzi.
- Spinelli, short Mafia muscle. Wears a hooded coat similar to a slicker. The first of Vito's thugs to be killed by Miho.
- Luca, Vito's brother and one of Magliozzi's hitmen. Dwight forces Vito to kill him.
- Vinnie, Mafia muscle. He is incredibly racist, especially towards Japanese.
- Don Giacco Magliozzi, leader of the local Mafia, residing in Sacred Oaks. He is main antagonist Herr Alarich Wallenquist's sworn enemy. The prostitute Daisy kills him at the conclusion of Family Values.
- Carmen, one of the Old Town Girls, portrayed in flashback. She ran away from her father's sexual abuse and began working as a prostitute in Old Town, where she fell in love with a woman named Daisy. She was killed in the crossfire when Vito shot up the diner, and inspired Dwight to take revenge.
- Daisy: Carmen's lover, who massacres the Magliozzi clan at the end of the story.
- Peggy: An alcoholic who supplies Dwight with information on Vito. In a flashback it is indicated she could be Bruno's wife, whom he cheated on. This would explain how she knew so much.
- Fat Man and Little Boy: Two loquacious mob hitmen. They also appear in That Yellow Bastard.

== Awards ==
- 1998:
  - Family Values won the "Best Graphic Album of Original Work" Harvey Award
