= Manute =

Manute may refer to:

- Manute Bol, Sudanese basketball player
- Manute, fictional character in the comic Sin City
