= Sin City =

Comic books series by Frank Miller

- Cover of The Hard Goodbye showing Marv walking through the rain
- First appearance: Dark Horse Presents Fifth Anniversary Special (April 1991)
- Created by: Frank Miller

Publication information
- Publisher: Dark Horse Comics
Title(s)
Dark Horse Presents Fifth Anniversary Special
Dark Horse Presents #51–62
The Big Fat Kill #1–5
A Dame to Kill For #1–6
Family Values
Hell and Back (A Sin City Love Story) #1–9
That Yellow Bastard #1–6
- Formats: Original material for the series has been published as a strip in the comics anthology(s) Dark Horse Presents and a set of limited series, graphic novels, and one-shot comics.
- Genre: Crime fiction, neo-noir, thriller
- Publication date: April 1991 – 2000
- Main character(s): Marv; John Hartigan; Gail; Dwight McCarthy; Nancy Callahan; The Roark Family; Wallace; Miho

Creative team
- Writer(s): Frank Miller
- Artist(s): Frank Miller

Reprints
- Collected editions
- The Hard Goodbye: ISBN 1-59307-293-7
- A Dame to Kill For: ISBN 1-59307-294-5
- The Big Fat Kill: ISBN 1-59307-295-3
- That Yellow Bastard: ISBN 1-59307-296-1
- Family Values: ISBN 1-59307-297-X
- Booze, Broads & Bullets: ISBN 1-59307-298-8
- Hell and Back: ISBN 1-59307-299-6

Sin City is a series of neo-noir comics by American comic book writer-artist Frank Miller. The first story originally appeared in Dark Horse Presents Fifth Anniversary Special (April 1991), and continued in Dark Horse Presents 51–62 from May 1991 to June 1992, under the title of Sin City, serialized in thirteen parts. Several other stories of variable lengths have followed. The intertwining stories, with frequently recurring characters, take place in Basin City.

A film adaptation of Sin City, co-directed by Robert Rodriguez and Miller, was released on April 1, 2005. A sequel, Sin City: A Dame to Kill For, was released on August 22, 2014.

== Publication history ==
Writer-artist Frank Miller rose to fame within the American comics industry with his 1981–1983 work on Marvel Comics' Daredevil, and the 1986 DC Comics miniseries The Dark Knight Returns, both of which exhibited subtle elements of film noir. Miller's venture into the film noir genre deepened with his creator-owned series Sin City, which began publishing in serialized form in the Dark Horse Comics anthology series Dark Horse Presents #51–62. The story was released in a trade paperback and later re-released in 1995 under the name Sin City: The Hard Goodbye.

In a 2016 interview with the Kubert School, Miller explained his inspiration for Sin City thus:

I've been a fanatic for a long time for old crime movies and old crime novels. But it started with the movies. And the old Cagney movies. Bogart and all that. I loved just how the morals of the stories are. They're all about right and wrong. But in Sin City in particular I wanted them all to happen to in a world where virtuous behavior was rare, which greatly resembled the world I lived in. It's kinda like the old Rolling Stones song, where every cop's a criminal, and all the sinners are saints, where the lowlifes would often be heroic, and the most stridently beautiful and sweet women would be prostitutes. I wanted it to be a world out of balance, where virtue is defined by individuals in difficult situations, not by an overwhelming sense of goodness that was somehow governed by this godlike Comics Code.

The film noir influence on the series' artwork is seen in its use of shadow and stark backgrounds. Black and white are the sole colors most of the time, with exception of red, yellow, blue, and pink, of which limited use is made in some stories to draw attention to particular characters.

The writing style also draws heavily on detective and crime pulp fiction.

Miller's Sin City work challenges some conventions of comic book form. The letters of onomatopoeic words like "blam" are often incorporated into scenes via lighting effects, or are suggested by the negative space between panels, or are created by the outline of the panels themselves. This is especially evident in early "yarns," such as The Hard Goodbye, which were more experimental.

On April 28, 2022, it was officially announced that Miller was launching the comic book publishing company Frank Miller Presents (FMP), with one of his initial contributions being a Western tale set in Sin City's past, titled Sin City 1858.

== Setting ==
An example of Frank Miller's use of high contrasts in Sin City

Basin City, almost universally referred to by the nickname "Sin City", is a fictional town in the Western United States. The climate is hot and arid, although Sacred Oaks is characterized as being heavily wooded. A major river runs through the city, which has an extensive waterfront. Usually twice a year, a major downpour comes, and the city is prone to heavy snowfall in the winter. Desert lizards and palm trees are common, while tar pits, desert areas, mountain ranges and flat farmland make up the landscape around the city.

The Basin City Police Department are more or less along the lines of paramilitary or SWAT, as they have to deal with incredibly high crime rates among criminals and civilians alike, which is why they have access to what most would consider "heavy weaponry" and full body armor. Those who make up the force have been described as commonly being lazy, cowardly and/or corrupt. Only a handful of the cops are honest, though frequently the wealthy of the city bribe the corrupt members of the police into performing their duty (usually as a result of some crime being committed or threatened against a member of their family).

During the California Gold Rush, the Roark family "imported" a large number of attractive women to keep the miners happy, making a fortune and turning a struggling mining camp into a thriving, bustling city. Over the years, as the Roark family migrated into other areas of business and power, these women ended up forming the district of Old Town, the prostitute quarter of the city where they rule with absolute authority. In addition, the people charged with governing the city, most of them from the Roark line, remained in power for generations, running it as they saw fit.

As the various yarns progress, the audience gradually becomes familiar with key locations in and around Basin City:

- The Projects, the run-down and poor side of Sin City, are a tangle of high-rise run-down and desolated apartments where crime runs rampant with no police inside. Its inhabitants have apparently evolved their own independent society with almost no legal contact with the outside world and SWAT teams rarely go in The Projects. Marv was born in the Projects, and currently resides there. Dwight avoids The Projects and hates the neighborhood.
- The Docks, a collection of wharfs and warehouses that are local to the Projects, since The Docks overlook The Projects. Hartigan and Roark Junior have their first confrontation here in That Yellow Bastard, and Marv drives a stolen police car off one of the piers at the beginning of The Hard Goodbye.
- Kadie's Club Pecos is a strip club and bar in Old Town, where Nancy Callahan and Shellie work, and where Dwight McCarthy and Marv spend their spare time. Despite being filled with drunk and violent men, Kadie's bar is one of the safest areas in Sin City since it is heavily guarded by prostitutes and their protectors. Marv, who possesses an extraordinarily high sense of chivalry, protects the female employees of Kadie's from any violence that makes its way inside.
- Roark Family Farm (a.k.a. "The Farm") is located at North Cross and Lennox on the hills outside Basin City and shows up in several stories, including The Hard Goodbye, That Yellow Bastard, The Babe Wore Red and Hell and Back. It was also home to Kevin, a serial killer with ties to the Roark family. Marv burns down one of the buildings, and the Farm is abandoned sometime after the initial Sin City storyline. The Farm is the only location in the comic books that is outside Basin City.
- Old Town is the red-light district, where the city's population of prostitutes reside. Old Town is run by Goldie and Wendy. Old Town is off limits to the police. Though willing to engage in almost any sexual act for the right price, the women of Old Town show no mercy to those who "break the rules," and back up their independence with lethal force. The mafia families and pimps who were into Old Town's business were thrown out of the neighborhood.
- Sacred Oaks is the home to the rich and powerful of Sin City. This suburb is located on the outskirts of Basin City as a protection. A university is located in Sacred Oaks, and the entire area is patrolled by armed employees of its wealthy inhabitants, mostly SWAT teams.
- Basin City Central Train Station, which has a direct connection to Phoenix. It is located in the outskirts near The Docks and it is considered one of safer places.
- Mimi's, a small run-down motel on the far outskirts of Basin City, with only few rooms and a place where young couples have sex. Nancy and Hartigan hid in Mimi's where she confessed her love to him. Junior also attacked Hartigan here and left him to die, although he saved himself.
- The Santa Yolanda Tar Pits, an abandoned amusement park of sorts outside the city, where several tar pits are located and dinosaur bones were excavated at some time. After a "big-budget dinosaur movie" caused a sensation, the county put up concrete statues of dinosaurs there to draw crowds. However, after an old lady fell through a railing into one of the pits and had a heart attack, the place was shut down indefinitely. They are frequently used as a place to dump things that people don't want found; high-schoolers also tend to sneak in there a lot. This is where Delia tells Phil to drive in Wrong Turn and where Dwight takes the corpses of Jackie Boy and his friends in The Big Fat Kill. Frank Miller has admitted the main reason the Tar Pits exist is as an excuse to draw the dinosaur statues.

== Characters ==
=== Individuals ===
- Marv
- Dwight McCarthy
- Nancy Callahan
- Gail
- Miho
- Detective John Hartigan
- Wallace

=== Organizations ===
Because a large majority of the residents of Basin City are criminals, there are several organizations and cartels central to the stories who are vying for monopoly over the various criminal enterprises in the city. Listed below are crime syndicates, gangs and other low-lifes who figure heavily in the Sin City mythos.

The Basin City Police Department: Police officers are among those involved in criminal activity in Basin city, often receiving bribes to turn a blind eye. A few choose not to partake in these endeavors, but they are still unable(or unwilling) to curtail the criminal actions of the others. Notable characters in the series who are police include Detective John Hartigan, his partner Bob, Lieutenants Jack Rafferty and Mort, Commissioner Liebowitz, and Officers Manson and Bundy from Hell and Back.

Roark family: A dynasty of corrupt landowners and politicians whose influence over Basin City has stretched as far back as the days of the Old West. Famous Roarks of this generation include a senator, a cardinal, an attorney general, and Roark Junior, 'That Yellow Bastard'.

The Girls of Old Town: Populating the region of Basin City known as Old Town is a group of women in the world's oldest profession, having made a truce with the cops to allow them to govern and police themselves. As of A Dame to Kill For, they were led by the twins, Goldie and Wendy.

Wallenquist Organization: A powerful crime syndicate led by Herr Wallenquist, a mysterious crime lord with a broad range of criminal enterprises to his name. Although they are one of the city's two "normal" criminal organizations, the Wallenquist management seems to be the most peaceful and forgiving of the various leaders. It is unknown which crime rings they hold.

Magliozzi Crime Family: The undisputed heads of the local Cosa Nostra, the Magliozzi family seems to be the purest example of "true" Mafia lifestyle. While they appear in only one story, it is hinted that the Mafia influence in Basin City's underworld is a lot larger than just their family and that there are more families.

Other groups that have been seen or mentioned in the comics include:

Tong gangsters: Mentioned, but not seen as of A Dame to Kill For. Miho's life was saved by Dwight when he secretly protected her during a fight with several Tong gangsters in a dark alleyway.

White slavers: Mentioned, but not seen as of A Dame to Kill For. Led by a man named Manuel, whose brothers were also involved. Were "taken care of" by Dwight prior to the events of A Dame to Kill For.

Irish mercenaries: Seen during The Big Fat Kill, most of them are evidently former IRA members, as implied by one of the mercenaries referring to his glee at blowing up a public house (British pubs were targeted by the IRA). All are killed by Dwight and Miho.

== Sin City yarns ==
These are the individual stories, usually referred to as "yarns," set in Frank Miller's Sin City universe. They were first published by Dark Horse Comics between April 1991 and April 2000.

=== Order of publication ===
Title	Pages	Date	Place of publication
The Hard Goodbye	194	April 1991 - May 1992	Under the title Sin City in Dark Horse Presents Fifth Anniversary Special and Dark Horse Presents #51-62
The Customer Is Always Right	3	August 1993	San Diego Comic Con Comics #2 (later republished in The Babe Wore Red and Other Stories one-shot)
A Dame to Kill For	205	November 1993 - May 1994	A Dame to Kill For #1-6
And Behind Door Number Three...	4	November 1994	The Babe Wore Red and Other Stories one-shot
The Babe Wore Red	24	November 1994	The Babe Wore Red and Other Stories one-shot
The Big Fat Kill	160	November 1994 - March 1995	The Big Fat Kill #1-5
Fat Man and Little Boy	4	July 1995	San Diego Comic Con Comics #4 (later republished in the Lost, Lonely & Lethal one-shot)
Silent Night	26	November 1995	Silent Night one-shot
That Yellow Bastard	210	February 1996 - July 1996	That Yellow Bastard #1-6
Daddy’s Little Girl	8	July 1996	A Decade of Dark Horse #1
Rats	7	December 1996	Lost, Lonely & Lethal one-shot
Blue Eyes	14	December 1996	Lost, Lonely & Lethal one-shot
Wrong Turn	23	March 1997	Sex & Violence one-shot
Wrong Track	3	March 1997	Sex & Violence one-shot
Just Another Saturday Night	17	August 1997	Just Another Saturday Night one-shot
Family Values	123	October 1997	Family Values graphic novel
Hell and Back	291	July 1999 - April 2000	Hell and Back #1-9

=== Collected editions ===
The stories have been collected into a number of trade paperbacks and hardcover editions. There is also a collection of art, The Art of Sin City.

In 2016, Dark Horse Comics released an ambitious, oversized edition titled Frank Miller’s Sin City The Hard Goodbye Curator’s Collection. This 15 x 21 inch book reprints the entire first storyline, scanned and reproduced exactly from the original art at 1:1 size. When referencing the production process in an interview with Michael Dooley for Print Magazine, editor/designer John Lind gave the anecdote, “When Frank and I first reviewed some of the scanned pages from Sin City, he pulled one aside and said, ‘You can see details in some of the scans where you can tell what the humidity was like when I was lettering because you can see the smudging from my hand.’ That type of reaction represents the level of detail I'm working hard to achieve with the production.”

==== Trade paperbacks ====
Name	Contents	ISBN
The Hard Goodbye	Episodes #1–13 of 13 from Dark Horse 5th Anniversary Special and Dark Horse Presents issues #51–62	ISBN 1-59307-293-7
A Dame to Kill For	Issues #1–6 of 6	ISBN 1-59307-294-5
The Big Fat Kill	Issues #1–5 of 5	ISBN 1-59307-295-3
That Yellow Bastard	Issues #1–6 of 6	ISBN 1-59307-296-1
Family Values	128-page original graphic novel	ISBN 1-59307-297-X
Booze, Broads, & Bullets	Collects the 11 shorter yarns: Just Another Saturday Night, Fat Man and Little Boy, The Customer Is Always Right, Silent Night, And Behind Door Number Three..., Blue Eyes, Rats, Daddy's Little Girl, Wrong Turn, Wrong Track, and The Babe Wore Red.	ISBN 1-59307-298-8
Hell and Back	Issues #1–9 of 9	ISBN 1-59307-299-6

==== Hardcovers ====
Name	Contents	Release date	ISBN
Frank Miller's Sin City Library Set Vol. 1	The Hard Goodbye, A Dame to Kill For, The Big Fat Kill, and That Yellow Bastard	December 2005	978-1-59307-421-0
Frank Miller's Sin City Library Set Vol. 2	Family Values, Booze, Broads and Bullets, Hell and Back, and The Art of Sin City	June 2006	978-1-59307-422-7
Big Damn Sin City	The Hard Goodbye, A Dame to Kill For, The Big Fat Kill, That Yellow Bastard, Family Values, Booze, Broads and Bullets, Hell and Back, and The Art of Sin City	June 2014	978-1-61655-237-4
Frank Miller's Sin City Vol.1: The Hard Goodbye Curator's Edition	The Hard Goodbye scanned from the original artwork in Frank Miller's archives and reproduced at full size. Introduction by Robert Rodriguez, with an afterword by Mike Richardson and an interview about the artistic process with Frank Miller.	August 2016	978-1-5067-0070-0
Frank Miller's Sin City Vol.1: The Hard Goodbye Deluxe Edition	Episodes #1–13 of 13 from Dark Horse 5th Anniversary Special and Dark Horse Presents issues #51–62	November 2021	978-1-5067-2837-7
Frank Miller's Sin City Vol.2: A Dame to Kill For Deluxe Edition	Issues #1–6 of 6	December 2021	978-1-5067-2838-4
Frank Miller's Sin City Vol.3: The Big Fat Kill Deluxe Edition	Issues #1–5 of 5	February 2022	978-1-5067-2839-1
Frank Miller's Sin City Vol.4: That Yellow Bastard Deluxe Edition	Issues #1–6 of 6	May 2022	978-1-5067-2840-7
Frank Miller's Sin City Vol.5: Family Values Deluxe Edition	128-page original graphic novel	June 2022	978-1-5067-2841-4
Frank Miller's Sin City Vol.6: Booze, Broads and Bullets Deluxe Edition	Collects the 11 shorter yarns: Just Another Saturday Night, Fat Man and Little Boy, The Customer Is Always Right, Silent Night, And Behind Door Number Three..., Blue Eyes, Rats, Daddy's Little Girl, Wrong Turn, Wrong Track, and The Babe Wore Red.	October 2022	978-1506722870
Frank Miller's Sin City Vol.7: Hell and Back Deluxe Edition	Issues #1–9 of 9	December 2022	978-1506722955

== Adaptations ==
=== Films ===
A film adaptation of Sin City, co-directed by Robert Rodriguez and Frank Miller, was released on April 1, 2005. A sequel, Sin City: A Dame to Kill For, was released on August 22, 2014.

=== Television ===
Dimension Films planned to develop a soft reboot of the series for television; Stephen L’Heureux who produced the second film was to oversee the series with Sin City creator Frank Miller. The new TV series would feature new characters and timelines and be more like the comics rather than the films. On November 15, 2019, Legendary Pictures bought the rights for the television series.

== Reception ==
Larry Snelly reviewed Sin City in White Wolf Inphobia #53 (March, 1995) and stated that "Sin City [...] scratches below the surface to reveal important issues [...] It makes you wonder if we've created our own 'sin cities' as we, as a society, value beauty over integrity."

=== Awards ===
- 1993:
  - The Hard Goodbye won the "Best Graphic Album: Reprint (Modern Material)" Eisner Award
  - Frank Miller won the "Best Penciller/Inker, Black & White Publication" Eisner Award, for The Hard Goodbye
  - Frank Miller won the "Best Writer/Artist" Eisner Award, for The Hard Goodbye
  - Sin City won the "Best Graphic Novel Collection" UK Comic Art Award
- 1994:
  - Frank Miller won the "Best Writer/Artist" UK Comic Art Award for his work on Sin City
- 1995:
  - A Dame to Kill For won "Best Limited Series" Eisner Award
  - "The Babe Wore Red," won "Best Short Story" Eisner Award
- 1996:
  - The Big Fat Kill won the "Best Limited Series" Eisner Award
  - The Big Fat Kill won the Favorite Limited Series Comics Buyer's Guide Fan Award
  - Sin City won the "Best Continuing or Limited Series" Harvey Award
- 1998:
  - That Yellow Bastard won the "Best Graphic Album-Reprint" Eisner Award
  - Family Values won the "Best Graphic Album of Original Work" Harvey Award
- 2000:
  - Hell and Back (A Sin City Love Story) won the "Favourite Black & White Comicbook" Eagle Award

== See also ==
- Sin City (film)
- Sin City: A Dame to Kill For
