= Marv (Sin City) =

Fictional character from Sin City

- Sin City character
- Mickey Rourke as Marv in the 2005 film adaptation
- First appearance: The Hard Goodbye
- Created by: Frank Miller
- Portrayed by: Mickey Rourke
- Publisher: Dark Horse Comics

In-universe information
- Full name: Marvin (Last name Unknown)
- Gender: Male
- Affiliation(s): Dwight McCarthy; Nancy Callahan; Goldie and Wendy
- Residence: Basin City

Marvin "Marv" is a fictional character in the graphic novel series Sin City, created by Frank Miller. In the 2005 film adaptation and its 2014 sequel, he is played by Mickey Rourke. He first appears as the main protagonist in The Hard Goodbye and follows with appearances in A Dame to Kill For, Just Another Saturday Night, and Silent Night. He makes a brief cameo in Blue Eyes (as featured in Lost, Lonely, and Lethal).

Marv has been well received both as a comic book character and a film character.

== Appearances in the Sin City series ==
Marv is one of the major characters of the series, and he appears or is mentioned in nearly every book. He is the protagonist of the first Sin City "yarn", The Hard Goodbye, as well as two shorter installments, Silent Night and Just Another Saturday Night. He also has a supporting role in A Dame to Kill For.

=== The Hard Goodbye ===
The Hard Goodbye begins as Marv has sex with a beautiful blonde prostitute named Goldie, only to wake up to find her dead and himself framed for her murder. He escapes from the cops and vows that he will avenge Goldie's death, killing his way through a chain of small-time thugs before learning the identity of Goldie's killer to be a mute and cannibalistic serial killer named Kevin. Kevin is the ward of Cardinal Patrick Henry Roark, and he is thus under the protection of the powerful Roark family.

Marv finds Kevin, but he is knocked out and finds himself in Kevin's basement, which is decorated with the heads of prostitutes mounted on the mantle. Marv also discovers that his parole officer, Lucille, is Kevin's next intended victim; he has already eaten her hand. He escapes with Lucille, who is killed by a squad of Sin City police. Marv, hearing from Lucille that Goldie was a prostitute, heads off to Old Town for more information before being ambushed by Goldie's twin sister Wendy, who also believed that Marv killed her sister. Marv convinces Wendy of his innocence and reluctantly takes her along to the infamous Roark family farm to subdue Kevin. Knocking Wendy out so she would not witness what will occur next, Marv inflicts the most brutal form of death he can imagine: sawing off Kevin's legs and leaving him to be eaten by his own pet wolf. Marv then finds Cardinal Roark, who admits that he and Kevin had been killing and cannibalizing prostitutes together and that Kevin killed Goldie for knowing too much. Marv kills Roark in an unspecified (but presumably grisly) manner before the police burst in and shower Marv with bullets.

Marv survives, however, creating a problem for the Roark family and the corrupt police force as he possesses knowledge that would have the city implode. The police threaten to kill Marv's mother unless he confesses to the murders that Roark and Kevin committed; Marv agrees, but only after breaking an attorney's arm in three places. He has a steak and a beer for his last meal. He is sentenced to die in the electric chair. Before his execution, Wendy visits him one last time to thank him for everything he has done. Marv goes to the chair, but survives the first jolt, defiantly saying to his executioners: "Is that the best you can do, you pansies?" They have to pull the switch again to finish him off, announcing "He's gone".

=== A Dame to Kill For ===
In A Dame To Kill For, a prequel to The Hard Goodbye, Marv becomes a sidekick of sorts to his good friend Dwight McCarthy by agreeing to help him rescue his former lover Ava Lord. When it is revealed to be a set-up, he rushes a mortally wounded Dwight to Old Town, where he is taken in by his former 'associate' Gail. Shortly afterwards, Marv becomes involved with Goldie.

=== Silent Night ===
In Silent Night, Marv rescues a young girl from sex traffickers. The story is told with almost no dialogue.

=== Just Another Saturday Night ===
In Just Another Saturday Night, Marv wakes up on the side of a highway, surrounded by dead men, and tries to piece together how he got there.

== Physical appearance ==
Marv is depicted as an extremely imposing, 7-foot-tall (2.1 m) man with a flattop buzzcut, a falcon-like nose and a heavily scarred face, making him unappealing to the opposite sex. He has a massive frame and is distinctly broad-shouldered, generally towering over his fellow characters. He is usually seen dressed in an overcoat, white undershirt, leather pants and combat boots.

== Personality ==
In the book Sin City: The Making of the Movie, creator Frank Miller describes the creation of Marv as a juxtaposition of his two biggest influences: film noir and medieval stories. The result was the idea for a character he called "Conan in a trench coat."

In the film Sin City his good friend Dwight remarks "most people think Marv is crazy. He just had the rotten luck of being born in the wrong century. He'd be right at home on some ancient battlefield swinging an axe into somebody's face. Or in a Roman arena, taking his sword to other gladiators like him."

Even for someone his size, Marv has an unusual level of speed which, coupled with his well developed fighting skills, incredible strength and pain tolerance, allow him to bring down nearly anyone who challenges him or breaks his personal code of ethics with startling ease. He notes with a measure of grudging respect in The Hard Goodbye that Kevin is the only person to ever successfully sneak up on him. Marv is also fond of long trench coats, and immediately prior to killing someone in possession of such a coat, he often remarks something to the effect of "That's a damn fine coat you're wearing", after which he takes their coat, especially if the one he had was damaged.

He suffers from an unnamed mental condition that causes him to "get confused", which, judging from his own awareness of his illness and the effects it is shown to have, probably involves short-term memory loss and possibly hallucinations. He also fears "turn[ing] into what they always said [he] was gonna turn into- a maniac, a psycho killer." Lucille, his parole officer, supplies him with medication (presumably antipsychotics) through her girlfriend Claire to control these effects of his condition. Claire, a psychiatrist, once tried to analyze him, but he claims she got "too scared."

Marv has convinced himself that he doesn't have a particularly high intellect, but he shows a surprising amount of intelligence when needed, noticeably an ability to logically deduce confusing and complex events quite accurately, sometimes based on scarce or conflicting information, and his skills in combat also imply a degree of intelligence from a tactical viewpoint. However, in most situations he just smashes his way through conflicts, such as kicking down a door and sending police flying, or charging a squad of heavily armed cops whilst only armed with a hatchet. In at least one instance, after being tied to a chair by Gail, who states that knots are her specialty, she and the rest of the girls of Old Town are startled to find out Marv was able to untie himself while being beaten by her, all without anyone in the room even noticing.

Marv has a well-developed skill and a strong appetite for torture. He never blinks, nor seems to think twice about inflicting the slowest, most creatively painful death he can possibly implement on his worst enemies. He often speaks in a soft, plain-spoken, calm, almost nonchalant demeanor, showing no sign of hesitation or fear, even while committing gruesome killings. Marv shows little to no fear in dangerous situations, even when heavily outnumbered, and faces them with a dry laconic humor. In The Hard Goodbye, instead of panicking when cornered by several members of the SWAT team, upon being asked to open the door, he lights up a cigarette and very calmly states "I'll be right out.", before successfully fighting his way out of the building.

While Marv has no compunction about maiming and killing anyone he feels has wronged him or those close to him, even he has his limits. He is deeply afraid of winding up as "a maniac [or] a psycho killer" (as mentioned previously). Marv will only kill someone if, as he himself puts it, "I know for sure I ought to." He makes it a point to avoid unnecessarily hurting or killing those who have not earned it in his eyes, and also notes with some amusement that he enjoys confrontations with paid hitmen, since he never feels guilty about what he does to them. A perfect example of his resolve to avoid causing unnecessary harm is when he knocks out Wendy rather than let her watch him dismember Kevin; he believed Wendy witnessing Kevin's dismemberment would cause her a lifetime of nightmares, and would therefore be unnecessarily hurting her, a belief which also superseded his otherwise ironclad rule against hitting women. He also adheres unrelentingly to his own personal code of honor, which dictates the repayment of debts and chivalry towards women, stating that "it really gets my goat when guys rough up dames", even refusing to lay a finger on Gail, who wrongly believed he had killed several prostitutes under her employ, after she tied him to a chair and tortured him for information. He also highly values kindness, often going out of his way to repay kindness shown to him. As such, he will defend anyone whom he considers a friend or has shown him kindness until he is no longer capable, or he feels the debt has been repaid, whichever comes first. As a devout Catholic, Marv condones the violence and blood on his hands, both figurative and literal, as justice against those who would do evil in the world, even if Marv's personal brand of justice might fly in the face of Catholic teachings. It may be best paraphrased as "It may be God's job to judge a man's evil deeds, but it Marv's job to arrange the meeting." noting that some things in this world are, in Marv's own words, "worth going to Hell for".

Marv is shown to have a platonic relationship with Nancy, being a sort of guardian angel to her, especially after an incident in which "some frat boyfriend of hers roughed her up". Another platonic relationship is with his social worker, Lucille, who is a lesbian. While Marv has no objections to her being a homosexual, or to homosexuality in general, he simply cannot fathom why Lucille is a lesbian, stating "that with a body like hers, she can have any man she wanted." Marv also has a soft spot for children, suggested when he rescues a little girl from pimps in Silent Night, as well as for animals, as shown when he knocks out, rather than kills, Kevin's wolf, which he only does as a matter of necessity to maintain the element of surprise, since Kevin's wolf had otherwise done nothing to wrong him. Throughout the story, Marv often shows a good-natured, humorous side, unresentful of even the worst that fate can throw at him and often showing a wry laconic sense of humor at the absurdity of his situations.

The one woman Marv loves above all others is his mother. His mother, who is blind, has a nigh-supernatural sense of hearing, and can hear Marv tip-toeing around the house, even when he is completely silent. She dotes on her only son, keeping his room exactly as he left it when he moved out, and shows concern for him when people come looking for him. He, in turn, treats her with great respect and is very protective of her, doing his best to keep her from harm or anyone who would even threaten to hurt her. For instance, when an assistant DA threatens her life after he refuses to sign a false confession, Marv signs it (after fracturing the assistant DA's arm in three places)

Marv in Silent Night

== Movie appearance ==
Marv is played by Mickey Rourke in the first film adaptation; Rourke took to the role despite the heavy amount of make-up work required and the minimal use of sets and even other actors. Because of the speed at which the film was shot (and the fact that most of the cast who appeared in multiple stories hadn't yet been cast), several of the people Rourke is seen interacting with weren't necessarily there during the day it was shot. During the scenes at Kadie's, he never met or interacted with Brittany Murphy, Clive Owen or Jessica Alba, all of whom were yet to be cast or scheduled for filming; those scenes were all shot on different days several months later. Similarly, Rutger Hauer and Elijah Wood never met Rourke either. Hauer was one of the last people to be cast and his scene was shot months after The Hard Goodbye had finished principal photography. Wood and Rourke were shot fighting each other's respective stunt doubles.

He also makes a cameo appearance in the segment That Yellow Bastard at the same bar where John Hartigan goes to look for Nancy Callahan, just as featured in The Hard Goodbye.

Rourke reprises his role as Marv in the 2014 sequel, Sin City: A Dame to Kill For. The actor stated that he had liked playing the character but, being claustrophobic, hated the long time spent for make up.

Rourke's portrayal of the character was very popular among audiences and critics, winning awards from the Academy of Science Fiction, Fantasy & Horror Films, Online Film Critics Society, Chicago Film Critics Association, and the Irish Film and Television Awards. On the Sin City DVD, Frank Miller commented that "After [the interview] with Rourke, I was only able to get down one note: 'He IS Marv!'"

== Merchandising ==
In 1999, Marv's likeness was captured in the form of three McFarlane Toys action figures, all depicting scenes from "The Hard Goodbye." One comes with Kevin's severed head and a gun, while another figure was made with bandages on his face. The latter also comes in black and white and a gun, while the other, known as "Death Row Marv", comes with an electric chair.

Death Row Marv was comparably rare to most other action figures on the market, as it was offered exclusively to comic book specialty stores and was not made available to larger chains such as Toys R Us and Walmart. Despite the fact that this was a collectible marketed solely towards adults, it caused a considerable amount of controversy.

In 2005, the license for Sin City toys has been acquired by NECA, who has also done their own versions of "Death Row Marv".

In 2007, Marv was announced to be in the second series of Marvel Toys' Legendary comic book heroes action figure line. Shortly afterward, another company, Dynamic Forces announced a full series of Sin City comic figures, which will start with a repaint of the Marvel Toys Marv figure.

== In popular culture ==
Marv and the film adaptation of Sin City was parodied in the Robot Chicken episode "Bionic Cow". Marv is portrayed as a gruff, mean spirited protector of cats and old women in Virtue City. He is voiced by Hugh Davidson.

== Reception and interpretation ==
The character is central to the series in Miller's own view: "He is part of the heart and soul of what Sin City is.[...] It's hard to imagine Sin City without Marv." Writing for The Detroit News, Adam Graham noted "drifting through them all [of the several semi-connected stories] is Mickey Rourke's hulking Marv character. A mass of bulk piled high into a brick wall of a man, his face flattened as though he was walloped by a cartoon anvil, Marv is the sadistic, beat up mascot of Sin City, where it is always dark and forever raining. Marv's worn, weary mug is the embodiment of Miller's dour worldview."

Marv is also the first character introduced chronologically.

Marv was described as "a sociopath with a heart of gold" or an "avenging angel thug" by The Columbus Dispatch. David Edelstein, of Slate, called Marv "a brutish and cynical barfly—Bukowski on steroids".

Marv belongs, with Dwight McCarthy, to the "bitter loners shunned by society who use acts of extreme violence to take revenge on the people who have hurt them or their loved ones." He was also called "a noir superman" and is generally described as a typical antihero. Harold Hellwig noted: "characters in Sin City (Marv, Hartigan, Dwight, among other lesser figures) attempt to save others while losing or almost losing their lives [...] all acting as chameleons in order to survive." The three main protagonists of the series are described as "dark, dangerous, but sentimental heroes".

"Sin City explores the concept of a “good madman” in the character of Marv, who is governed by a moral code of protecting women and children yet driven by intense homicidal urges. Marv's actions in The Hard Goodbye are not fueled by any selfish desire but a fixation on the complete removal of a perceived evil force, so Marv essentially ceases to be a man and becomes a force of pure violence", wrote Joseph Romito.

Marv has been well received both as a comic book character and a film character. Marv was ranked as the 24th greatest comic book character in Wizard magazine. Empire magazine also ranked Marv as the 26th greatest comic book character of all time writing that "Marv is a grade A patsy, the fall guy, the hapless hero at the center of a conspiracy that he can't even begin to understand but with a traditional Miller tweak... [he is] a force of nature, cutting a path through the corrupt power-brokers of the city, until his pound of flesh (and more) has been exacted." Also in 2008, Empire magazine ranked Marv as the 82nd greatest film characters: "He ain't too bright, but it turns out that Marv, despite his seemingly indestructible (if bandage-swathed) exterior, has a soft center." IGN also listed Marv as the 75th greatest comic book hero of all time, writing that "Sin City is a place where only the strong and sadistic can survive. Marv is a little of both, but he also has a noble streak and an unbreakable sense of loyalty towards those few people who can see beneath his craggy exterior and recognize the good man within."

The portrayal of Marv "earned Rourke recognition" and "capitalized on his drastic physical transformation from sex symbol to almost monstrous freak", noted Rebecca Bell-Metereau.

Although the character "is never actually identified as a mutant, but the superhuman level of abuse he can endure" allows the viewer to liken him to one, according to Dan Rampala. Nicolas Suppa of CBR noted that, in that regard, Marv has "supernatural strength [and] phenomenal detective abilities" which would have him "fit well in the DC Universe because he has hulk-like qualities. He's big, he's mean, and he's angry. However, off the battlefield he feels nothing but pain and remorse and goes to great lengths to protect those he loves."

His "association with a vivid color" pairs him, as the defender of women, with Ethan Roark Jr. (Junior), the killer of women, noted David Roche and Maurice Christelle.

Les Cahiers du cinéma wrote that the character, "an oversized dumb brute [...] with a face studded with scars", is interpreted by Rourke as if through an "inner drift" while, regarding the original version, Denson, Meyer & Stein found that to create "dark looming figures like Marv" Miller "draws on the visual power which the expressionist film directors from Germany explored most forcefully".

The Companion to American Literature sees in Marv "the only truly moral person of the story" and find that the treatment of the character exemplifies Miller's breakthrough in characterization and visual techniques.
