= Fender Bender (film) =

2016 American film by Mark Pavia

- Directed by: Mark Pavia
- Written by: Mark Pavia
- Produced by: Joshua Bunting; Jordan Fields; Gus Krieger; Carl W. Lucas
- Starring: Makenzie Vega; Dre Davis; Cassidy Freeman; Kelsey Leos Montoya; Harrison Sim; Bill Sage
- Cinematography: Tyler Lee Cushing
- Edited by: Lana Wolverton
- Music by: Nightrunner
- Production companies: Brainstorm Media; EchoWolf Productions
- Distributed by: Shout! Factory
- Release date: 23 May 2016
- Running time: 91 minutes
- Country: United States
- Language: English

Fender Bender is a 2016 American slasher film by writer and director Mark Pavia. Fender Bender is the first film co-produced with ChillerTV and Shout! Factory. It went into production on November 4, 2015. Shout! Factory developed, financed, and distributed the film and it premiered on ChillerTV June 3, 2016, after a limited theater release on May 23, 2016. The film was shot in Albuquerque, New Mexico, but is set in Colorado, and follows a 17-year-old girl being stalked by a serial killer.

== Plot ==
Hilary (Makenzie Vega), a 17-year-old girl, gets into a fender bender shortly after obtaining her driver's license. She innocently provides all of her information to the other driver (Bill Sage). When Hilary returns home, her parents are angry at her, though the stranger rear-ended her. As a result, they go on holiday without her, leaving her alone and vulnerable. Hilary invites her friends, Rachel and Erik, over and receives a text from the stranger. She has unwittingly become his next victim as the mysterious driver stalks her suburban home later that stormy night, while she, Erik, and Rachel defend themselves. Complicating matters is Hilary's ex-boyfriend, who appears on the doorstep drunk.

== Cast ==
- Makenzie Vega as Hilary Diaz
- Dre Davis as Rachel
- Cassidy Freeman as Jennifer
- Kelsey Montoya as Erik
- Harrison Sim as Andy
- Steven Michael Quezada as Mario
- Lora Cunningham as Olga
- Bill Sage as the Driver

== Release ==
Fender Bender was released by Shout! Factory on June 3, 2016, airing on Chiller TV. Shout! Factory released the film on Blu-ray and DVD format on October 4, 2016.

== Reception ==
Felix Vasquez Jr. of Cinema Crazed stated that he was "expecting almost nothing and was shocked at how effective it was in the end. It's a solid stalk and chase slasher film mixing Death Proof and The Hitcher and director Pavia delivers a strong genre entry suitable for a lazy Friday night and some beers." Jake Dee of The Joblo Network rates the film a 5 out of 10 citing lack of originality and "over-trampled" "Halloween-like tropes" as drawbacks while redemption comes in the slick pacing and ever increasing gore and violence culminating in its avoidance of a pat Hollywood ending which "make the movie a bit better than perhaps it should be."
