= Sin City: A Dame to Kill For =

2014 film directed by Robert Rodriguez and Frank Miller

- Theatrical release poster
- Directed by: Robert Rodriguez; Frank Miller
- Written by: Frank Miller
- Based on: Sin City by Frank Miller
- Produced by: Robert Rodriguez; Boriss Teterevs; Aaron Kaufman; Stephen L'Heureux; Sergei Bespalov; Alexander Rodnyansky; Mark Manuel
- Starring: Mickey Rourke; Jessica Alba; Josh Brolin; Joseph Gordon-Levitt; Rosario Dawson; Bruce Willis; Eva Green; Powers Boothe; Dennis Haysbert; Ray Liotta; Jaime King; Christopher Lloyd; Jamie Chung; Jeremy Piven; Christopher Meloni; Juno Temple
- Cinematography: Robert Rodriguez
- Edited by: Robert Rodriguez
- Music by: Robert Rodriguez; Carl Thiel
- Production companies: Dimension Films; Aldamisa Entertainment; Troublemaker Studios; Miramax; Demarest Films; Solipsist Films; A.R. Films; The Fyzz Facility
- Distributed by: The Weinstein Company
- Release dates: August 19, 2014 (TCL Chinese Theatre); August 22, 2014 (United States)
- Running time: 102 minutes
- Country: United States
- Language: English
- Budget: $65 million
- Box office: $40.7 million

Sin City: A Dame to Kill For (also known as Frank Miller's Sin City: A Dame to Kill For) is a 2014 American action crime anthology film and follow-up to the 2005 film Sin City. Directed by Robert Rodriguez and Frank Miller, the script is written by Miller and is primarily based on the second book in the Sin City series by Miller, A Dame to Kill For.

One of the smaller plots of the film is based on the short story "Just Another Saturday Night", which is collected in Booze, Broads, & Bullets, the sixth book in the comic series. Two original stories ("The Long Bad Night" and "Nancy's Last Dance") were created exclusively for the film written by Miller. The film stars an ensemble cast including returning cast members Mickey Rourke, Jessica Alba, Rosario Dawson, Jaime King, Powers Boothe (in his final film role), and Bruce Willis. Newcomers to the series include Josh Brolin, Joseph Gordon-Levitt, Eva Green, Dennis Haysbert, Ray Liotta, Christopher Lloyd, Jamie Chung, Jeremy Piven, Christopher Meloni, Stacy Keach, Lady Gaga, Alexa Vega, Julia Garner, and Juno Temple.

The film premiered at the TCL Chinese Theatre on August 19, 2014 and was released by The Weinstein Company on August 22, 2014, on 2D, 3D and RealD 3D. Unlike the first film, A Dame to Kill For underperformed at the box office, grossing $40.7 million against its $65 million production budget, and received mixed reviews from film critics.

== Plot ==
=== "Just Another Saturday Night" ===
Marv regains consciousness on a highway overlooking The Projects, surrounded by several dead young men and a crashed police car, with no memory of how he got there. He retraces his steps, recalling that since it's Saturday, he watched Nancy Callahan dance at Kadie's Saloon. Stepping outside, he encounters four rich frat boys burning a homeless man alive. When Marv intervenes, the leader of the frat boys shoots him in the arm, calling him "Bernini Boy", which Marv mishears as "Bernie". They flee, and Marv follows them, stealing a police car on the way, which he crashes into their car, leading to his blackout and memory loss. He follows the two surviving frat boys into The Projects, the neighborhood where he grew up. With the assistance of the deadly residents lurking in the shadows, he dispatches the frat boys. He questions the leader about being called "Bernini Boy", and learns that it is the brand of coat he is wearing. After slitting the boy's throat, he considers his coat and realizes he cannot remember how he acquired it.

=== "The Long Bad Night (Part I)" ===
Johnny, a cocky young gambler, arrives in Sin City and heads to Kadie's place. He immediately hits the jackpot on multiple slot machines. Taking a young waitress, Marcie, with him as a good luck charm, he buys into the backroom poker game led by the all-powerful Senator Roark. Johnny repeatedly wins in the high-stakes game, and cleans the senator out. One other player, the corrupt police lieutenant Liebowitz, warns him to flee the city. Instead, Johnny takes Marcie out for a night on the town. He walks her home, and Roark's goons suddenly attack him. He fights them off, and tells Marcie to meet him at a hotel, and he is escorted into Roark's limousine. In payment for the humiliation he suffered at the card game, Roark takes back his money, and uses a pair of pliers to break the fingers of Johnny's playing hand. They toss Johnny out of the car, and the senator shoots him in the leg. Roark reveals that he recognized Johnny as his illegitimate son. However, he remarks that he only considered his dead son Roark Jr., his flesh and blood. He leaves Johnny alive, preferring to let him suffer, and Johnny swears revenge.

=== "A Dame to Kill For" ===
Years before "The Big Fat Kill", Dwight McCarthy attempts to put his violent past behind him, working as a private detective and leading a life of complete sobriety, and struggles daily to refuse his inner demons. After saving the life of Sally, a prostitute who is nearly murdered by her businessman lover, he receives an unexpected phone call from his former lover Ava Lord, who left Dwight four years prior for a wealthy tycoon, Damien Lord. She begs him to meet her at Kadie's saloon, and despite his embittered feelings, he agrees. When Ava arrives, she begs forgiveness for leaving him, and implies she is afraid for her life before her massive chauffeur, Manute, arrives to escort her home. Unable to get her out of his mind, Dwight sneaks into Damien Lord's estate, where he observes Ava swimming, but is caught and beaten. Dwight is returned home, where a nude Ava waits for him. He tries to throw her out, but can't resist her and they make love. She tells him that Damien and Manute torture her physically and mentally, and she knows Damien will kill her soon. Manute arrives and viciously beats a naked Dwight, sending him out the window with a single punch.

Determined to rescue Ava, Dwight recruits Marv to help him, and they mount an assault on Lord's compound. Marv attacks Manute, putting him in traction, and tearing out his eye. Dwight confronts Damien Lord, who denies Ava's accusations, and an enraged Dwight beats him to death. As he reacts in horror, Ava appears and shoots Dwight several times, taunting him, and thanking him, for helping her murder her husband, and take over his fortune. She shoots him in the face and forces him to fall out of a window, where Marv rescues him and takes him to Old Town. Dwight's old flame, Gail, recognizes him and saves his life. With the help of Gail, and the deadly assassin Miho, Dwight undergoes reconstructive surgery on his face, and plots his revenge.

Meanwhile, two detectives, Mort and Bob, investigate Damien's death. Ava claims Dwight was an obsessive ex-lover, and he killed her husband in a jealous rage. Bob is skeptical, but Ava seduces Mort, who believes her every word. They begin an affair and Ava pressures him to find and kill Dwight. When Mort, obsessed with Ava, attempts to track Dwight down in Old Town, an action that would break the truce between the police and the prostitutes, Bob attempts to stop him. An enraged Mort shoots Bob in the face, then commits suicide afterward. Out of options, Ava reluctantly partners with the mob boss Wallenquist.

Dwight, with his face newly reconstructed, is accompanied by Gail and Miho, posing as Wallenquist's man from Texas. Inside Ava's estate, however, Manute sees past the new face, and captures Dwight. Gail and Miho strike from Dwight's car, and Dwight shoots Manute with a hidden .45 he had up his left sleeve. Six bullets fail to kill him, and Manute aims shakily at Dwight, as Ava unexpectedly grabs one of Manute's guns, shooting Manute several times. She attempts to convince Dwight to pair with her, and that the pain he suffered revealed his true intentions, but Dwight shoots her mid-kiss, and she dies in his arms.

=== "Nancy's Last Dance" ===
Four years after "That Yellow Bastard", Nancy Callahan is in a deep depression over John Hartigan's death. She is obsessed with getting revenge on Senator Roark for having driven Hartigan to kill himself. As she wallows in despair, the ghost of Hartigan watches over her, unable to reach her but still attempting to help. On the same night that Johnny joins the backroom poker game, Nancy attempts to shoot Roark from the stage of Kadie's, but she can't bring herself to pull the trigger.

Nancy hallucinates a visit from Roark, and shortly thereafter cuts her hair and smashes a mirror, using its shards to cut her face. She decides to get Marv to help her kill Roark by showing him the scars, and making him believe that Roark was responsible. As they step out of the club, they meet a motorcycle gang that are there to shoot up the place. Marv kills two, but leaves their leader for Nancy to finish off. The pair mount an assault on Roark's compound. Marv slaughters Roark's bodyguards, while Nancy picks off the guards with a crossbow. Marv is wounded, but Nancy continues alone to confront Roark. Roark shoots her first in the side, then the leg, and is about to finish her off. Suddenly, Hartigan's ghost appears in the mirror, startling Roark long enough for Nancy to recover and kill him.

== Cast ==
- Mickey Rourke as Marv
- Jessica Alba as Nancy Callahan
- Josh Brolin as Dwight McCarthy
- Joseph Gordon-Levitt as Johnny
- Rosario Dawson as Gail
- Bruce Willis as John Hartigan
- Eva Green as Ava Lord
- Powers Boothe as Senator Ethan Roark
- Dennis Haysbert as Manute
- Ray Liotta as Joey
- Stacy Keach as Alarich Wallenquist
- Jaime King as Goldie and Wendy
- Christopher Lloyd as Dr. Kroenig
- Jamie Chung as Miho
- Jeremy Piven as Detective Bob
- Christopher Meloni as Detective Mort
- Juno Temple as Sally
- Marton Csokas as Damien Lord
- Jude Ciccolella as Commissioner Liebowitz
- Julia Garner as Marcie
- Lady Gaga as Bertha
- Alexa Vega as Gilda
- Patricia Vonne as Dallas
- Frank Miller as Sam
- Robert Rodriguez as Sam's Friend

== Production ==
In 2005, after Sin City was released, Rodriguez announced plans for a follow-up film that would feature many of the same characters. He planned for the film to be based on A Dame to Kill For. Miller said the film would be a prequel and a sequel with interlinking stories both before and after the first film. Miller, who was writing the screenplay in 2006, had anticipated for production to begin later in the year. However, Rodriguez had also said that official casting would not start until the script was finalized and in the studio's hands. At the 2007 Comic-Con, Frank Miller confirmed that he and Robert Rodriguez had completed a script, but blamed the Weinstein brothers for the delay.

During the 2011 San Diego Comic-Con, Rodriguez stated that the script for Sin City 2 was nearing completion and that it was his hope that shooting could begin before the end of the year. Rodriguez said that Sin City 2 would comprise A Dame to Kill For, "Just Another Saturday Night", and two original stories Sin City creator Miller had written for the film, one new story reportedly titled "The Long Bad Night". In August 2011, Rodriguez stated that the script was almost completely finalized and that he had already received funding for the film, and that production would commence once the script was finalized. In September 2011, it was revealed that William Monahan had been brought in to add the finishing touches to Miller's screenplay. In March 2012, Rodriguez announced that production on Sin City 2 would begin in mid-2012. He also mentioned that the cast would be "of the same caliber and eclecticism" as the previous film. It was also announced the film would be released in 3D.

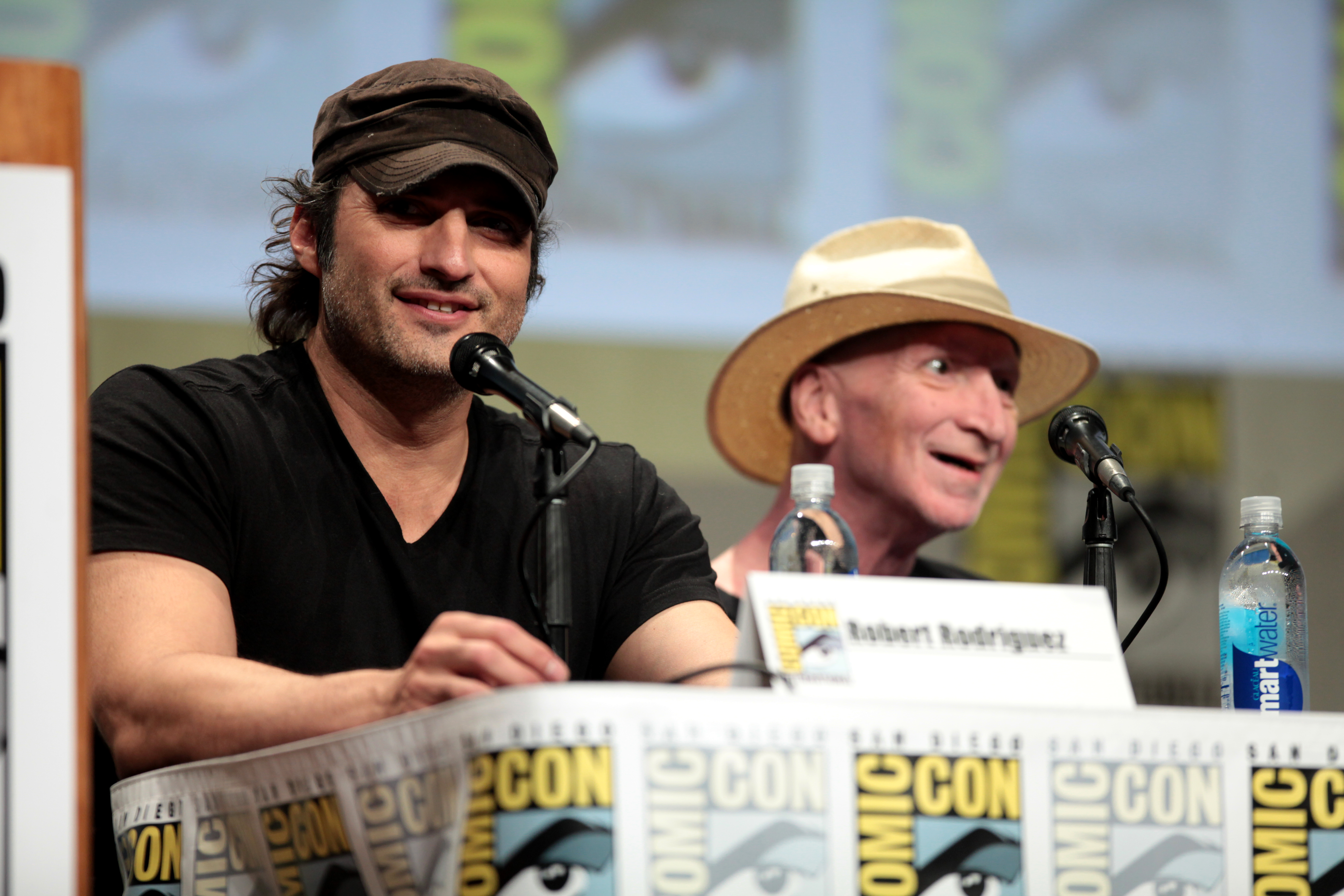
Rodriguez and Miller at a panel for the film at San Diego Comic-Con in July 2014

On April 13, 2012, the film was confirmed, in addition to the new title, Sin City: A Dame to Kill For. The film was expected to go into production in the summer of 2012, but principal photography began near the end of September 2012. On June 17, 2013, the film's release date was pushed back from October 4, 2013, to August 22, 2014. Rodriguez later explained that the film was always intended for release in 2014 and that they were merely holding the October date for Machete Kills. In May 2014, the Motion Picture Association of America banned a poster of the film featuring Eva Green due to nudity visible through a sheer gown.

=== Casting ===
During initial pre-production following release of the first film in 2005, Angelina Jolie was said to be Rodriguez's first choice in the role of Ava, so much so that he was delaying production to correspond with her pregnancy, according to Rosario Dawson; but subsequent articles throughout the years stated that other rumored frontrunners in addition to Jolie were Salma Hayek, Rose McGowan, and Rachel Weisz. On January 29, 2013, it was officially announced that Eva Green had been cast in the role.

On October 29, 2012, it was confirmed that Devon Aoki would not return to reprise her role as Miho due to her second pregnancy, and that Jamie Chung would take over the role in the second film. On December 5, 2012, it was announced that Dennis Haysbert would replace Michael Clarke Duncan (who died before production began) as Manute.

On January 7, 2013, it was confirmed that Joseph Gordon-Levitt was cast as new character Johnny, described as "a cocky gambler who disguises a darker mission to destroy his most foul enemy at his best game". The character is not to be confused with another character named Johnny, featured in the short story "Daddy's Little Girl". The following day, it was reported that Josh Brolin was cast as Dwight. On January 29, 2013, it was revealed which characters new cast members Ray Liotta, Juno Temple, Christopher Meloni, and Jeremy Piven would play (their casting was announced much earlier, but their roles unspecified). Liotta was cast as Joey Canelli, a married businessman who is cheating on his wife. Temple was cast as Sally, Joey's mistress and a girl from Old Town. Meloni was cast as Mort, Bob's new partner and one of the few honest cops of Basin City. Piven replaces Michael Madsen as Bob (although Madsen was initially announced to be returning during pre-production). The same day, it was announced that Julia Garner was cast as Marcie, a young stripper who crosses paths with new character Johnny. On February 5, it was announced that Stacy Keach had been cast as villain Wallenquist.

== Release ==
The film premiered at the TCL Chinese Theatre on August 19, 2014. The film was released in the United States on August 22, 2014.

=== Box office ===
Sin City: A Dame to Kill For grossed $13.8 million in North America and $26.9 million in other countries for a worldwide total of $40.7 million, against a production budget of $65 million.

In North America the film earned $2.6 million on its opening day and $6.3 million on its opening weekend, finishing eighth for the weekend. After the poor opening weekend, news sources universally called the film a major box office failure, citing the causes as lackluster marketing, weak reviews and diminished interest from a nine-year gap between the two Sin City films. In its second weekend, the film dropped to number 14, grossing $2.9 million over the four-day holiday. In its third weekend, the film dropped to number 16, grossing $691,410.

=== Critical response ===
On the review aggregator website Rotten Tomatoes, 42% of 189 critics' reviews are positive, with an average rating of 4.3/10. The website's consensus reads: "A Dame to Kill For boasts the same stylish violence and striking visual palette as the original Sin City, but lacks its predecessor's brutal impact." Metacritic, which uses a weighted average, assigned the film a score of 46 out of 100, based on 38 critics, indicating "mixed or average" reviews. Audiences polled by CinemaScore gave the film an average grade of "B-" on an A+ to F scale.

Alonso Duralde of The Wrap gave the film a negative review, saying "This is Rodriguez's second sequel in a row in which he turns sex, violence and exploitation into an occasion for dullness. For a film loaded with decapitations and gun-toting ladies in bondage gear, Sin City gets really tedious really quickly." Justin Chang of Variety gave the film a negative review, saying "Rare indeed is the movie that features this many bared breasts, pummeled crotches and severed noggins and still leaves you checking your watch every 10 minutes." Todd McCarthy of The Hollywood Reporter gave the film a positive review, saying "As an exercise in style, it's diverting enough, but these mean streets are so well traveled that it takes someone like Eva Green to make the detour through them worth the trip." Soren Anderson of The Seattle Times gave the film two out of four stars, saying "This new Sin City features the signature characteristics and many of the original's characters but seems less adventurous. It feels a little flabby and self-satisfied. The element of surprise is gone." Peter Travers of Rolling Stone gave the film two out of four stars, saying "Sin City: A Dame To Kill For doesn't explode onscreen the way the first one did. Miller's monochrome palette, splashed with color that shines like a whore's lip gloss, doesn't startle as it once did." Peter Hartlaub of the San Francisco Chronicle gave the film one out of five stars, saying "It is, in almost every way, inferior to its predecessor. It's poorly paced and repetitive."

Amy Nicholson of LA Weekly gave the film a C−, saying "Eva Green is sexy, funny, dangerous and wild — everything the film needed to be — and whenever she's not on screen, we feel her absence as though the sun has blinked off." Bill Goodykoontz of The Arizona Republic gave the film two and a half stars out of five, saying "This is a great cast, but with the few exceptions they simply serve the effects." Kristin Tillotson of the Star Tribune gave the film two and a half stars out of five, saying "Sin City: A Dame to Kill For is worth the watch if you expect nothing more than disparate comic-strip frames of action. But nine years in coming, this follow-up ultimately fizzles." Stephanie Merry of The Washington Post gave the film two out of four stars, saying "The aesthetic quality is still there, even if there haven't been too many great leaps since Rodriguez unveiled Sin City in 2005. But the stories aren't nearly as engrossing." Joe Williams of the St. Louis Post-Dispatch gave the film two and a half stars out of four, saying "As in the first film, there are judicious stabs of color. And Alba is a showstopper in a fringed cowgirl outfit. But nine years wiser, we know that pretty things aren't always worth killing for." Claudia Puig of USA Today gave the film two out of four stars, saying "The cartoonish mayhem in Sin City: A Dame to Kill For aims for a film noir sensibility, but too frequently the script simply resorts to anachronistic scenes of Jessica Alba twerking." Rafer Guzman of Newsday gave the film two out of four stars, saying "The movie's trademark mix of live action and drawing techniques (white silhouettes, reddened lips, an abundance of venetian blinds) looks fantastic. If it's depth you want, you've knocked on the wrong door."

Tom Russo of The Boston Globe gave the film two and a half stars out of four, saying "As usual with Sin City, much of the vibe is about echoing genre touchstones, while the look isn't quite like anything else the digital age has seen." Peter Howell of the Toronto Star gave the film two and a half stars out of four, saying "It's a town of bad women and worse poets, where the fists are hard, the talk is tough but nothing is for real - and nothing doesn't add up to much." Jeannette Catsoulis of The New York Times gave the film a negative review, saying "Punishingly stylized, this marriage of comic-book panels and hard-boiled dialogue has a heaviness that can't be explained solely by its cynicism or lack of wit. It's a blunt instrument whose visual shadings far surpass the kill-or-be-killed storytelling." Betsy Sharkey of the Los Angeles Times gave the film a negative review, saying "The greatest sin of Frank Miller's Sin City: A Dame To Kill For is the way its high style is brought low -- visually stunning, but emotionally vapid, unrelentingly violent, its splendiferous comic book cast mostly squandered." Liam Lacey of The Globe and Mail gave the film two out of four stars, saying "If you showed the Sin City midnight world in smaller doses, as a weekly series on late-night cable television, the slick graphics and cold kink might be more compelling." James Berardinelli of ReelViews gave the film three out of four stars, saying "For those who appreciated Robert Rodriguez and Frank Miller's 2005 campy, kinetic film noir homage, Sin City, the 2014 follow-up, Sin City: A Dame to Kill For is unlikely to disappoint."

=== Home media ===
Sin City: A Dame to Kill For was released on November 18, 2014, on Blu-ray 3D, Blu-ray and DVD. The special features include "The Movie In High-Speed Green Screen—All Green Screen Version", "Makeup Effects Of Sin City With Greg Nicotero", "Stunts Of Sin City With Jeff Dashnaw", and "Character Profiles".

== Cancelled sequel ==
Wallace was set to appear in Sin City 3, which was to be directed by Rodriguez and Frank Miller. Rodriguez said he wanted Johnny Depp to play the part. Depp was originally supposed to play the part of Benicio del Toro's Jack "Jackie Boy" Rafferty; however, filming of Sin City conflicted with that of Depp's projects at the time. Depp expressed great interest in being a part of the Sin City franchise.

Frank Miller revealed at the 2014 Comic-Con that he and director Robert Rodriguez had discussions about a potential third Sin City film. Miller said at the event, "So you better show up for number two, or they won't pay for it". Due to the poor box office numbers for Sin City: A Dame To Kill For, and mixed reception of the film, plans for the third Sin City film were cancelled.

== TV series ==
Dimension Films planned to develop a soft reboot of the series for television; Stephen L'Heureux, who produced the second film, was to oversee the series with Sin City creator Frank Miller. The new television series would feature new characters and timelines and be more like the comics rather than the films. On November 15, 2019, Legendary Pictures bought the rights for the television series.
