= Slag (disambiguation) =

Slag is a by-product of smelting ore.

Slag may also refer to:

== Arts, entertainment, and media ==
- Slag (play), an early play by David Hare
- Slag (video game), a 1980 game for the TRS-80
- Slag (Transformers), a fictional character in the Transformers series
- The Slag brothers, characters in the American animated television series Wacky Races

== Other uses ==
- Slag (welding), a by-product of some arc welding processes
- Slag, a pejorative British term for slut
- Slag, an alternative name for spoil tip, mining waste

== See also ==
- "Slag off" (Irish), see Insult comedy
