= Makenzie Vega =

American actress (born 1994)

- Born: Makenzie Jade Vega; February 10, 1994 (age 32); Los Angeles, California, U.S.
- Occupation: Actress
- Years active: 1999–present
- Spouse: Blair Norfolk (m. 2017)
- Children: 2
- Relatives: Alexa Vega (sister); Carlos Pena Jr. (brother-in-law)

Makenzie Jade Vega Norfolk (born February 10, 1994) is an American actress. She is known for her role as Grace Florrick on The Good Wife and as the 11-year-old counterpart of Nancy Callahan in Sin City.

== Life and career ==
Vega was born on February 10, 1994, in Los Angeles, California. Her father, Baruch Vega, is a Colombian fashion photographer who was an informant for the Drug Enforcement Administration, and her mother, Gina Rue, is an American former model. She is the younger sister of actress Alexa PenaVega.

At age five, Vega played one of the children of Teddie Cochran (Geena Davis) in The Geena Davis Show. In 2000, she was cast as Annie, the Campbells' precocious daughter, playing opposite Nicolas Cage and Téa Leoni in The Family Man. The following year, Vega was seen again playing Chloe in Made which starred Vince Vaughn, Jon Favreau and Famke Janssen. In 2004, she played Diana Gordon, daughter of Dr. Lawrence Gordon (Cary Elwes) and Alison Gordon (Monica Potter) in the horror film Saw. That same year, Vega portrayed Sal in Chestnut: Hero of Central Park. The following year, she played young Nancy Callahan, alongside Bruce Willis in Sin City. Vega then appeared in Just My Luck as Katy, starring Lindsay Lohan and Chris Pine, and also in the summer blockbuster X-Men: The Last Stand as the Prison Truck Little Girl, a disguise of Mystique.

Vega played Grace Florrick, the daughter of Alicia Florrick (Julianna Margulies), in the CBS drama The Good Wife; she was a regular cast member through six of the show's seven seasons, and was recurring cast member in the seventh and final season, with Grace providing critical plot elements to the series' finale. In 2015, Vega was cast in the lead role in the thriller film Fender Bender, which premiered on the Chiller channel in June 2016.

== Personal life ==
Vega married Australian model Blair Norfolk on February 4, 2017, in a secret wedding, which the couple announced publicly three weeks after. Their daughter, Marlo, was born on December 19, 2020. Vega gave birth to a second daughter in February 2025.

== Filmography ==
=== Film ===
Film roles
Year	Film	Role	Notes
2000	The Family Man	Annie Campbell	
2001	Made	Chloe	
2004	Saw	Diana Gordon	
2004	Chestnut: Hero of Central Park	Sal	
2005	Sin City	Young Nancy Callahan	
2006	Just My Luck	Katy Hardin	
2006	X-Men: The Last Stand	Prison Truck Little Girl	
2007	In the Land of Women	Paige Hardwicke	
2014	Code Academy	Sheridan	Short film
2016	Fender Bender	Hilary	
2022	Exploited	Lexi	

=== Television ===
Television roles
Year	Title	Role	Notes
1999	Dr. Quinn: Revolutions	Maria	Television film
2000–2001	The Geena Davis Show	Eliza Ryan	Main role; 22 episodes
2006	Justice	Mary Nicks	2 episodes Uncredited for 1 episode
2007	Ghost Whisperer	Becca Cahill	Episode: "All Ghosts Lead to Grandview"
2009	ER	Vera	Episode: "I Feel Good"
2009–2016	The Good Wife	Grace Florrick	Main role (seasons 1–6); recurring role (season 7); 103 episodes
2014	The Assault	Sam Gleason	Television film
2016	Heartbeat	Gloria Gonzalez	Episode: "The Inverse"
2016	Pretty Little Dead Girl	Emma Miller	Television film
2018	Tomboy	Tori	Television film
2018	The Beach House	Toy Sooner	Television film
2018	13 Reasons Why	Sarah Carlin	2 episodes
2018	Love, of Course	Cara Andolini	Television film
2020	InstaPsycho	Kelly Ryan	Television film

=== Awards and nominations ===
Year	Award	Category	Nominated work	Result
2001	Phoenix Film Critics Society Awards	Best Performance by a Youth in a Leading or Supporting Role	The Family Man	Nominated
2001	Young Artist Awards	Best Performance in a Feature Film – Young Actress Age Ten or Under	The Family Man	Won
2001	Young Artist Awards	Best Performance in a TV Series (Comedy or Drama) – Young Actress Age Ten or Under	The Geena Davis Show	Nominated
2010	Young Artist Awards	Best Performance in a TV Series – Recurring Young Actress	The Good Wife	Nominated
2010	Screen Actors Guild Awards	Outstanding Performance by an Ensemble in a Drama Series	The Good Wife	Nominated
2011	Young Artist Awards	Best Performance in a TV Series (Comedy or Drama) – Supporting Young Actress	The Good Wife	Nominated
2011	Screen Actors Guild Awards	Outstanding Performance by an Ensemble in a Drama Series	The Good Wife	Nominated
2012	Screen Actors Guild Awards	Outstanding Performance by an Ensemble in a Drama Series	The Good Wife	Nominated
