= Nancy Callahan =

Fictional character from Sin City

- Sin City character
- Jessica Alba as Nancy Callahan in Sin City
- First appearance: The Hard Goodbye
- Last appearance: Sin City: A Dame to Kill For
- Created by: Frank Miller
- Based on: "Dirty" Harry Callahan by Harry Julian Fink & R. M. Fink
- Portrayed by: Jessica Alba; Makenzie Vega (young)

In-universe information
- Alias: Cordelia
- Gender: Female
- Occupation: Stripper
- Significant other: John Hartigan
- Affiliation(s): John Hartigan; Marv
- Residence: Basin City

Nancy Callahan is a fictional character from the graphic novel series Sin City, created by Frank Miller, based on "Dirty" Harry Callahan by Harry Julian Fink and R. M. Fink. She first appeared in "The Hard Goodbye" before becoming a more prominent character in later stories, most notably That Yellow Bastard.

Nancy is a stripper working at Kadie's Bar, a popular Basin City strip club populated by several key characters. She is depicted as a sensitive, strong willed, caring woman who occasionally becomes involved in the town's criminal underworld. Her full history is explained in That Yellow Bastard , in which she is rescued from Roark Junior by John Hartigan, and becomes a target of the corrupt Roark family.

== Appearances ==
=== That Yellow Bastard ===
At the age of 11, Nancy is kidnapped by Ethan Roark Junior, a serial killer & rapist of young girls who has already claimed three victims. Hartigan, a police officer one day from retirement, defies his corrupt partner, Bob, and pursues Junior.

Hartigan defeats Junior's bodyguards before pursuing him to the town docks, where he shoots Junior in the ear, hand, and genitals, sending him into a coma. Suddenly, Bob appears and shoots Hartigan several times in the back, moments before the police arrive; during this time, Nancy comforts Hartigan and subsequently visits him in the hospital. Unfortunately, Junior's father, a powerful Senator, blackmails Hartigan, threatening to murder his family and any significant other if he exposes Junior to the media. As a result, Hartigan warns Nancy (who is forbidden from testifying) to stay away, although she promises to write him weekly letters.

Hartigan is charged with Junior's crimes and imprisoned for eight years, but Nancy remains true to her promise, writing him one letter per week. Over the years, Nancy matures into a young woman, attempting to fall in love but unable to deny her true feelings for Hartigan. She is eventually hired at Kadie's Bar, where she works as a stripper while attending law school in an attempt to become a lawyer. Hartigan, believing Nancy has been captured by Senator Roark as a result of faked evidence, confesses to Junior's crimes and is immediately set free. Hartigan then discovers Nancy at Kadie's Bar, only to realize Junior, hideously deformed after being revived by treatments outside of modern medicine, has followed him, having simply made Hartigan think that Nancy had been discovered so that he could lead them to her. Nancy forces herself onto Hartigan, repeatedly kissing him until he warns her of Junior's presence.

They flee the bar, but Junior appears and attempts to shoot them. Hartigan defeats him, however, believing him to be dead. Upon arriving at Mimi's Motel, Nancy confesses her love to Hartigan and continues kissing him, although he strongly disapproves of her actions due to the distinct age gap between them, commenting that he's old enough to be her grandfather. Junior, having been merely wounded in the incident, reappears; he strips and binds Hartigan, leaving him to die from hanging. He plans to take Nancy to the Roark family's farmhouse, where he will finally achieve revenge by torturing, raping, and killing her.

Junior departs with Nancy, taking her to the farm; although they are briefly delayed by engine trouble, they nevertheless arrive well before Hartigan, who has escaped his bindings and is currently nearing the farm. Once there, Junior begins whipping Nancy, who refuses to scream. As Junior flies into a rage, Nancy realizes that he is impotent unless his victims are screaming in fear. She mocks him, making him even angrier. Just then, Hartigan arrives, defeats Junior's bodyguards and corners Junior, who momentarily appears to gain the upper hand; however, Hartigan stabs him in the chest, castrates him with his bare hands, and beats him to death.

Following Junior's death, Hartigan informs Nancy of his plans to arrest Senator Roark. After she leaves, however, Hartigan commits suicide to protect Nancy from the Senator's wrath.

=== Other appearances ===
Nancy briefly appears in a number of other Sin City stories, usually as a background character in Kadie's Bar. She appears dancing in A Dame to Kill For, and again in Just Another Saturday Night, where she appears with Hartigan in a flashback to That Yellow Bastard. She also appears twice in The Hard Goodbye, once performing her exotic dance and again towards the novel's conclusion; local misfit Marv asks her to drive Wendy, an Old Town prostitute, to the local airport. Chronologically, this scene happens after the events of That Yellow Bastard.

== In other media ==
Nancy is portrayed as an adult and child by Jessica Alba and Makenzie Vega respectively in the 2005 film adaptation.

=== Nancy's Last Dance ===
Alba reprised the role in the 2014 sequel Sin City: A Dame to Kill For and has a larger role in "Nancy's Last Dance", one of the four separate stories in the film. "Nancy's Last Dance" is set four years after the events of That Yellow Bastard.

The segment depicts Nancy, still working at Kadie's, having been in a deep depression since Hartigan's death. As she wallows in alcoholic despair, Hartigan's ghost watches over her, but is unable to reach her. She is obsessed with getting revenge on Senator Roark for having driven Hartigan to kill himself. One night, Nancy attempts to shoot Roark from the stage of Kadie's, but finds herself unable to pull the trigger.

Nancy hallucinates a visit from Roark, and shortly thereafter cuts her hair and smashes a mirror, using its shards to cut her face. She decides to get Marv to help her kill Roark by showing him the scars, and making him believe Roark was responsible. As they step out of the club, they meet a motorcycle gang there to shoot up the place. Marv kills two, but leaves their leader for Nancy to finish off. The pair mount an assault on Roark's compound, and Marv slaughters Roark's bodyguards, with Nancy picking off the survivors with a crossbow. When Marv is wounded, Nancy continues on to confront Roark by herself. Roark shoots her several times and is about to finish her off when Hartigan's ghost suddenly appears in the mirror, startling him. Roark hesitates long enough for Nancy to recover and kill him.

== Reception ==
She "is a typically complex character" and "arguably the most important character" in the eye of Miller and Rodriguez, according to TeenStuff. The role was also discussed as "eliding [Alba's] Latina Identity", marking thus a change in her career, but still "premised on her "hotness"" and as 'her most iconic role to date" according to Matt Green.

Miller and Rodriguez acknowledged that Alba's contribution to the character brought some changes to the image of Nancy: "Miller was sold as soon as he saw Alba take the stage in Nancy's signature cowboy chaps. "What Jessica brought right away was pretty astonishing, because I picked an Emmylou Harris song that I really liked for her to work off," he recalled. "She came out with a lasso, danced across the stage and I was seeing a dream come true. I could not keep my eyes dry. I mean, it made me weep! She finished the dance, and everyone stood there in utter, stony silence. Jessica jumped off the stage and said [disappointed], 'Well, I went over big.' And I had to follow her out and say, 'No -- they were speechless.' Because from the beginning, she was that good.""
