= A Dame to Kill For =

1993–1994 comic book series by Frank Miller

- Cover for A Dame to Kill For

Publication information
- Publisher: Legend (Dark Horse Comics)
- Schedule: Monthly
- Format: Limited series
- Genre: Crime
- Publication date: November 1993 - May 1994
- No. of issues: 6
- Main character(s): Dwight McCarthy; Marv; Ava Lord; Manute

Creative team
- Created by: Frank Miller
- Written by: Frank Miller
- Artist(s): Frank Miller
- Letterer(s): Frank Miller
- Editor(s): Jerry Prosser

Collected editions
- A Dame to Kill For: ISBN 1-59307-294-5

A Dame to Kill For is a comic book limited series written and drawn by Frank Miller and first published by Dark Horse Comics in 1993. It is the second story in Miller's Sin City series, and the first to be published in miniseries format. It has since been reprinted in graphic novel format in four separate editions.

The 2014 film Sin City: A Dame to Kill For is partly based on the graphic novel along with Just Another Saturday Night and two original segments written by Miller for the film. The film received mixed reviews and was a box office failure compared to the positive reception and financial success of the first Sin City film in 2005.

== Plot ==
The story begins as Dwight McCarthy, working as a photographer for a grossly overweight man named Agamemnon, saves one of the Old Town prostitutes, Sally, from one of her customers, whom Dwight was investigating on behalf of his wife; he then drives her back to Old Town. That night he receives a call from a woman named Ava Lord, asking him to meet her at a seedy bar called Kadie's Club Pecos. Dwight is suspicious of her, as Ava broke his heart four years ago by running off with another richer man, Damien Lord, but the lure of seeing her again is too powerful and he agrees to meet her anyway.

Marv is also there and greets Dwight. Ava arrives late (as she often used to) and attempts to convince Dwight her life is a "living hell" and begs for his forgiveness; Dwight refuses to listen until Ava mentions she believes she will soon be dead. But just then, Manute, Damien Lord's valet, arrives and takes Ava away. Ava is reluctant to go, but when Dwight attempts to defend her, she convinces him to stand down, asking him to remember her before she leaves. Dwight goes home, but cannot sleep. He decides to check up on Ava.

At Ava's estate, Dwight hops a fence and uses his photography equipment to find Ava swimming in the nude. He is discovered and claims that he is simply a Peeping Tom when Manute and Damien become involved. Ava comes to investigate and Dwight pretends not to know her, worried his presence may make things bad for Ava. Manute pretends not to recognize him from the bar in front of Damien then beats him brutally before throwing him from a car into the street. Dwight calls Agamemnon for a ride home and they stop several times for fast food.

As Dwight arrives home, he finds his Ford Mustang returned and his door unlocked. In his bedroom he finds Ava nude. Following a heated argument, they eventually reconcile and make love. Ava talks about how her husband regularly charges Manute with abusing her physically, believing soon Damien will go too far and kill her. She confesses to Dwight she came to him that night for one last night of love before Manute kills her, but then says she realizes she is not ready to die. Manute arrives and violently beats Dwight when he tries to defend her. Dwight is knocked out of his upper story apartment window to the street below, where he blacks out momentarily. He awakens to see Manute driving off with Ava.

Determined to rescue her, Dwight arrives at Kadie’s, where Marv is in the middle of a squabble with some out-of-town punks and the bar owner Kadie. One of them pulls a gun on Marv. At first Marv is patient, warning the out-of-towners not to offend Kadie or himself and further. But after calling Kadie "a cow" and Marv "ugly", Marv quickly and easily knocks him flat; the rest quickly scatter. Dwight convinces Marv, over several drinks and whilst watching Nancy dance, to help him storm Damien's estate. Both drunk as they approach the mansion, Dwight insists Marv leave the punk's gun, which Marv has procured, in the car. Marv tackles the guards as a distraction and eventually takes on Manute, ripping his right eye out and beating him savagely.

With Manute and the guards occupied, Dwight makes his way to Damien. When he finds him in his office, Damien calls Ava pathological and pulls a gun on Dwight. When Damien fires, Dwight beats him to death. As Dwight panics, realizing what he has done, Ava appears, and explains how Dwight was all a part of her plan to murder Damien whilst keeping her hands clean, so she can inherit his estate. Ava tells Dwight she never loved him or Damien, that she's waited years to "be in charge", even goes so far as to call herself "evil". She shoots Dwight six times, including once in the face. Dwight once again falls out of a window and is picked up and saved by Marv.

Upon Dwight's insistence, Marv drives him to Old Town. They're followed by a police car, and when the police reach Old Town, they're met by a hailstorm of bullets, revealing to the reader that cops have no authority in Old Town. Now in Old Town, Dwight finds a hooker, his old flame, Gail. Gail takes him to her surgeon just as he goes into cardiac arrest. The hookers of Old Town perform surgery on Dwight's multiple bullet wounds, then the leaders of the ladies (the Twins) tell him to leave. Gail proclaims her unwavering allegiance to Dwight and reveals to Miho, a deadly assassin, Dwight had saved her only three years ago. After gaining the loyalty of Gail and Miho, the Twins allow him to stay however long he wants, for rest and more surgery.

Two detectives following up on Damien Lord's death, Mort and Bob, talk to Ava. She claims that Dwight was a stalker psychopath who killed Damien out of jealousy. They believe her story, and soon after Mort begins an affair with Ava. They interrogate Agamemnon, who tells how Dwight is an upright man who went clean after being a wild alcoholic with a short temper in his younger days. When they speak with Dwight's landlady, she tells them about letting Ava in Dwight's apartment and the resulting loud noises of Ava and Dwight's sexual encounter then fight between Dwight and Manute the night of Damien's murder.

After multiple inconsistencies with Ava's story Bob doubts Ava considerably now. Mort, on the other hand, has left his wife and fallen in love with Ava and refuses to see past her lies. Mort becomes more on-edge towards his partner when Bob continues to speak ill of Ava. This culminates with Mort killing Bob, then committing suicide. During the scene in which Mort kills Bob, while they are driving in the car, Wendy and Marv can be clearly seen driving past them, presumably on their way to butcher Kevin.

Meanwhile, Dwight is recovering from his near-fatal wounds and calls Ava to inform her he is coming for her soon. Ava, with her late husband's financial assets, is joining her corporation with the mob boss Wallenquist. Unaffected by Ava's flirting, he warns her not to underestimate him again and tells her to tie up her loose ends with Dwight; he has someone arriving from Phoenix soon to meet her about that.

Dwight (with his new face), accompanied by Gail and Miho, poses as Wallenquist's man from Phoenix. Inside Ava's estate, however, Manute sees past the new face and captures Dwight. Gail and Miho strike from Dwight's car, and Dwight shoots Manute with a hidden .25 he had up his left sleeve. Six bullets fail to kill him, and Manute aims shakily at Dwight as Ava grabs one of Manute's guns, shooting Manute in his shoulder.

Manute falls through a window and, upon landing, is stabbed in the arms by Miho, pinning him to the ground. Ava then tries to get Dwight to kill him, telling him that Manute had her under mind control to manipulate her and Damien and that it would be a cruel irony if he killed her now. Dwight finally sees through all the lies and kills Ava.

== Reception ==
In his review for the Journal of Adolescent & Adult Literacy, James Blasingame said that even though A Dame To Kill For is a quick read, it has a complex story. He says, "All of the elements of a good novel are present, plot; beginning, middle, ending; dramatic crescendo; fully developed characters; complex constructions of narrative perspective; and, despite Miller’s graphic style, not so black-and-white socially troubling questions about the nature of good and evil, justice, and redemption."

The series won the 1995 Eisner Award for Best Limited Series.

== Collected editions ==
The series has been collected into a trade paperback (ISBN 1-59307-294-5).
