= That Yellow Bastard =

Comic book limited series

- Cover to That Yellow Bastard #1. Art by Frank Miller. It shows a menacing-looking Detective Hartigan

Publication information
- Publisher: Legend (Dark Horse Comics)
- Schedule: Monthly
- Format: Limited series
- Genre: Crime
- Publication date: February - July 1996
- No. of issues: 6

Creative team
- Created by: Frank Miller
- Written by: Frank Miller
- Artist: Frank Miller
- Letterer: Frank Miller
- Editor: Bob Schreck

Collected editions
- That Yellow Bastard: ISBN 1-59307-296-1

That Yellow Bastard is a six-issue comic book limited series and the sixth in the Sin City series. It was published by Dark Horse Comics in February–July 1996. It follows the usual black and white noir style artistry of previous Sin City novels, with the exception of yellow on Roark Junior late in the story.

It is one of the comics adapted into the Sin City film.

== Plot ==
The story begins more than eight years before any other Sin City book takes place, with policeman John Hartigan on his final mission before his forced retirement (he has severe angina). Roark Junior, son of one of the most powerful and corrupt officials in Basin City, is indulging his penchant for raping and murdering pre-pubescent girls. It is Hartigan's mission to rescue Junior's latest quarry, an 11-year-old named Nancy Callahan.

Hartigan succeeds in rescuing Nancy by disabling Junior's getaway car, which was being guarded by Burt Schlubb and Douglas Klump, two guns-for-hire with "delusions of eloquence". Hartigan knocks them out and kills the twin guards Benny and Lenny. He chases the escaping Junior to the pier and then proceeds to use his revolver to surgically shoot off Junior's left ear, right hand, and genitals. Before he can finish Junior off, Hartigan's corrupt partner Bob, who fears angering Senator Roark, shoots Hartigan several times. Hartigan then stalls Bob for as long as he can to save Nancy when backup arrives, going so far as to pull a spare gun and have Bob unload his gun on him. Bob leaves the fallen Hartigan, who passes out with Nancy in his arms.

Roark Jr. lapses into a coma from his injuries, and Senator Roark takes issue with the abuse of his son. Hartigan survives and recovers thanks to the senator, who wants Hartigan to suffer for the rest of his life. He is framed for raping Nancy, branded as a pedophile and sentenced to a lengthy prison term amid a public outcry that brands him one of Sin City's most hated citizens. He remains silent about his pain, knowing that Senator Roark would execute anyone who ever found out the truth. The only one to whom Hartigan speaks in the hospital is Nancy, who sneaks out against her parents' wishes to see the man who saved her. Hartigan tells her to stay away from him, so Nancy tells Hartigan she will write him letters instead. She will sign her name as "Cordelia" to hide her identity. Before leaving, Nancy tells Hartigan she loves him.

After his stint in the hospital, Hartigan is seen tied to a chair, cuffed and being beaten by Det. Liebowitz in order to force him to sign a false confession. Amid the hours of repeated punching and being tempted by prison luxuries and even sex with an Old Town prostitute, Hartigan doesn't crack under the pressure, although he hallucinates that he is granted the strength of Hercules, breaks from his cuffs and kills Liebowitz by exploding his head.

Afterwards, alone in prison and abandoned by his wife Eileen (who remarries and finally has children) and his friends, he finds solace in the carefully disguised weekly letters he receives from Nancy. Hartigan quickly develops a paternal love for young Nancy, and sees her as the daughter he never had. For eight years, he drags himself through his jail time, his only respite the letters his young admirer sends him, until finally the letters stop coming. Although he initially believes Nancy has merely outgrown her childhood hero, Hartigan soon becomes increasingly worried that Senator Roark has finally found her. His fears are confirmed when a deformed, hairless visitor with sickly yellow skin who smells distinctly like garbage arrives at his prison cell and punches him out. Hartigan awakens and discovers the same type of envelope Nancy always uses containing an index finger from the right hand of a 19-year-old girl.

Cover to That Yellow Bastard #4. Art by Frank Miller. Roark Jr. reborn as the Yellow Bastard.

Believing Nancy to be in imminent danger, Hartigan decides to find some way out, and contacts his lawyer, Lucille (the lesbian parole officer from The Hard Goodbye). Much to her surprise and disgust, Hartigan decides to claim responsibility to the crimes of which he was accused. At his parole hearing, he is humiliated again when Senator Roark piously offers to forgive him. Hartigan knows it's a ruse to insult him, but asks Senator Roark for forgiveness in order to win parole. Hartigan is finally released, apparently due to Senator Roark's satisfaction over his confession and submission.

Back on the streets, the now 60-year-old Hartigan sets off to find Nancy. He goes to her apartment, but finds it empty and in disarray. The only clue to her whereabouts is a pack of matches from Kadie's bar. Following the lead, Hartigan discovers that she is now a woman who works in the club as an exotic dancer - and is unharmed. The envelope containing the finger was merely a ploy to lead Roark to Nancy. Hartigan smells a set-up, and something far worse: the distinct odor of rotting garbage. "That Yellow Bastard", the man who arrived at the cell with the envelope, has followed him and found Nancy.

Nancy recognizes Hartigan and jumps into his arms, kissing him. They leave Kadie's and get into her car. There is a high-speed pursuit, with the "Bastard" close on their tail, Hartigan uses Nancy's revolver to fire a precise shot that hits the "Bastard" in the neck. Hartigan insists on stopping to confirm the kill; accompanied by Nancy, he discovers the "Bastard's" foul-smelling blood everywhere, but no body. Eventually, he and Nancy hide out in a motel. There, they share a kiss, where Nancy reveals she is in love with him; but Hartigan refuses to move any further because of his age and the paternalistic nature of his relationship to Nancy. Unknown to them, the "Bastard" has hidden in the backseat of Nancy's car, and he emerges while they talk.

Hartigan, in the shower, is ambushed once again by "That Yellow Bastard", who reveals himself to be none other than Roark Junior. Senator Roark used his vast financial resources to resurrect his son using new medical techniques to re-grow his severed body parts. As a result, Junior lives, but with some "side-effects". Junior knocks Hartigan down, attempts to hang him naked with a noose, and boasts of raping and killing dozens of girls over the past eight years. He then taunts Hartigan with the promise that Nancy will suffer the same fate. Roark Jr. kicks the desk out from under Hartigan and escapes with Nancy.

Cover of That Yellow Bastard #6. Art by Frank Miller. Hartigan is shown beating Roark Jr. to death.

At first, Hartigan resigns himself to death but, in a sudden bout of determination, he revives himself through sheer will, breaks a window and cuts his hands free with a glass shard. Schlubb and Klump arrive to dispose of Hartigan's body, but Hartigan subdues them and forces them to reveal Junior and Nancy's whereabouts. He learns that Junior has fled to the Roark Family Farm (described as "a place where bad things happen").

Racing to the Farm, Hartigan suffers a severe angina attack, but soldiers through the pain. Meanwhile, Nancy is being flogged by Junior but, like Hartigan, resists the urge to scream in order to deny her torturer the satisfaction; she then realizes that Junior is impotent unless he hears his victims scream. Hartigan takes down four other corrupt police officers guarding the Farm and confronts Junior, who by that time has Nancy at knife point. Hartigan fakes a heart attack to catch Junior off guard. He stabs Junior, castrates him (this time with his bare hands), and beats him to death. Nancy and Hartigan share another, more passionate, kiss, and Hartigan tells Nancy to flee, assuring her that he will call up some old police friends of his to clean up the scene of the crime.

After Nancy leaves, Hartigan narrates that he had to lie to her in order to protect her; Senator Roark will want to punish Hartigan for killing his son, and would not hesitate to use Nancy in order to do so. Knowing full well that no sane attorney would try to prosecute Senator Roark, Hartigan realizes that there is only one way to end the entire ordeal. In an act of pure love and sacrifice, Hartigan shoots himself in the head to save Nancy and end Roark's vendetta.

== Collected editions ==
It was first collected as a trade paperback in July 1997 (ISBN 1-56971-225-5) which was republished in 2005 (ISBN 1593072961). In 1997 Titan Books released a hardcover edition (ISBN 1569711925). Noticeably, it is the first Sin City trade paperback to include color in the story.

== Awards ==
- 1998: Won "Best Graphic Album-Reprint" Eisner Award

== Film adaptation ==
In the film adaptation, Bruce Willis stars as Hartigan, Jessica Alba as Nancy, Nick Stahl as the Yellow Bastard/Junior, Powers Boothe as Senator Roark and Michael Madsen as Hartigan's partner, Bob. There are only a few notable differences in the film version: Mort is replaced by Bob when Hartigan is released from prison, and an appearance by Carla Gugino as Lucille is omitted (but reinstated in the extended version released to DVD).

In the DVD commentary, Frank Miller indicated that he was initially motivated to write That Yellow Bastard after his disappointment with The Dead Pool, the fifth and final film in the Dirty Harry series. Nancy — who prior to this story had no last name — was named "Callahan", a name shared with Clint Eastwood's character, Harry Callahan.
