= The Big Fat Kill =

Five-issue comic book limited series

- Cover to Sin City: The Big Fat Kill #2. Art by Frank Miller. The characters Dwight and Gail

Publication information
- Publisher: Legend (Dark Horse Comics)
- Schedule: Monthly
- Format: Limited series
- Genre: Crime
- Publication date: November 1994 - March 1995
- No. of issues: 5

Creative team
- Created by: Frank Miller
- Written by: Frank Miller
- Artist(s): Frank Miller
- Letterer(s): Frank Miller
- Editor(s): Bob Schreck

Collected editions
- The Big Fat Kill: ISBN 1-59307-295-3

The Big Fat Kill is a five-issue comic book limited series published by Dark Horse Comics in November 1994–March 1995.

== Plot ==
Inside her apartment, a frightened Shellie is comforted by Dwight — with a new face since the events of A Dame To Kill For — as the drunken Jackie Boy bangs on the door. Dwight tells Shellie to let Jack and his entourage in, confident he can "handle them".

Jackie Boy enters and insists Shellie call her fellow barmaids to join his pub crawl but she refuses, and Jack hits her. He goes to the bathroom where Dwight ambushes him with a straight razor and tells him to stop bothering Shellie, dunking his head in the toilet.

Jack storms out with his posse. Shellie finds Dwight on the ledge outside the building; determined to stop Jack from causing more trouble, Dwight pursues him, ignoring Shellie's muffled yell that sounds like "Stop!".

Speeding after Jack's car, Dwight catches the attention of police, who follow them to the border of Old Town, the area of Sin City populated by prostitutes. Walking alone, Becky rejects Jack’s request for her services. In pursuit, Dwight meets Gail, one of Old Town's most experienced hookers and guardians, who advises him to let the girls handle Jack themselves. Spotting Miho on the roof, he agrees.

When Jack pulls a handgun on Becky, Miho throws a Manji-shaped shuriken that cuts off Jack's hand, then descends on the car and kills his entourage. Jack aims his gun at Miho, who throws a plug into the barrel. Jack tries to shoot Dwight and the gun shatters, embedding the slide into his forehead. Miho finishes him off by slicing his neck, making "a Pez dispenser out of him".

As the girls loot the corpses, Dwight finds Jack's police badge, revealing him to be Detective Lieutenant "Iron" Jack Rafferty — he realizes that Shellie had screamed "COP!". As Jack's death would break Old Town's shaky truce with the police, Dwight recommends disposing of the bodies in the tar pits.

The bodies are sliced up to fit in the trunk of a car, leaving Jack in the passenger seat, and Dwight begins the rainy drive to the Pits. He is taunted by Jack's corpse and is pulled over by police, who let him off with a warning for a broken taillight.

At the Tar Pits, Dwight is attacked by Irish mercenaries and is seemingly killed by a shot to the chest. The mercenaries finds Jackie Boy's badge, having stopped the bullet, and Dwight disposes of several of them but is knocked into the pits with the sinking car. A mercenary removes Jackie Boy's head as proof of his murder, and leaves Dwight for dead. Miho rescues Dwight, and he deduces that an informant in Old Town has told the mob of Jack's death. Dwight takes off with Miho and her driver, Dallas, in pursuit of the remaining mercenaries.

In Old Town, Gail is kidnapped and tortured by Manute, having survived his previous encounter with Dwight and Miho. Gail refuses to "facilitate" the process of surrendering Old Town; she learns Becky has sold them out, and bites a chunk off of her neck.

Dwight recalls the Battle of Thermopylae, where King Leonidas defeated his enemies in a narrow trap (a story Miller would later tell in 300). They catch up to their targets in the Projects. Dallas rams the car into the mercenaries' and is gunned down. Dwight corners the last mercenary, Brian, in the sewers, but is caught off guard by grenades until Miho kills Brian. Recovering the head, they return to Old Town.

As the gangsters prepare to further torture Gail and kill Becky, Miho shoots a henchman with an arrow bearing a note, offering to trade Jack's head for Gail's life.

The gangsters find Dwight alone in a narrow alley. He hands over the head and takes Gail, then triggers a grenade taped inside Jack's mouth.

The gangsters realize their fatal mistake as the heavily armed girls of Old Town appear on the rooftops, opening fire until, in Dwight's words, "the things we're pumping bullets into are nothing but twisted toppling screaming smudges of movement."

== Collected editions ==
The series has been collected into a trade paperback (ISBN 1593072953).

== Reception ==
Steve Faragher reviewed The Big Fat Kill for Arcane magazine, rating it an 8 out of 10 overall. Faragher comments that "this is a beautiful book studded with rusty nails, a glorious synergy of text and art and a must read for all his fans."

== Awards ==
- 1996:
  - Won "Best Limited Series" Eisner Award
  - Frank Miller nominated for "Best Cover Artist" Eisner Award, for The Big Fat Kill

== Film adaptation ==
The story is one of three from Sin City related in the film Sin City. In the film, Clive Owen plays Dwight, Brittany Murphy plays Shellie, Benicio del Toro plays Jack, Rosario Dawson plays Gail, Devon Aoki plays Miho, Alexis Bledel plays Becky, and Michael Clarke Duncan plays Manute. The film was directed by Frank Miller and Robert Rodriguez, with Quentin Tarantino co-directing The Big Fat Kill, specifically the drive-to-the-pits scene in which Dwight talks with a dead Jack Rafferty.

A notable difference from the comic version is that Becky survives the final gunfight by hiding in a nook in the alley, leaving her alive for the final "epilogue" scene of the movie which ends when she meets The Salesman from The Customer is Always Right, who had been introduced in the movie's prologue. He then offers her a cigarette just like he did in The Customer is Always Right, and Becky seems to sense why he's there and tells her mother she loves her before hanging up. There is also a deleted/extended scene from the movie, where Manute and two thugs actually escape the gunfight, bloodied and battered, only to be cornered by Miho in the alley. Miho then tosses the sword right through the two thugs, and finally and definitely kills Manute by bisecting him with a scythe.
