= Elijah Wood filmography =

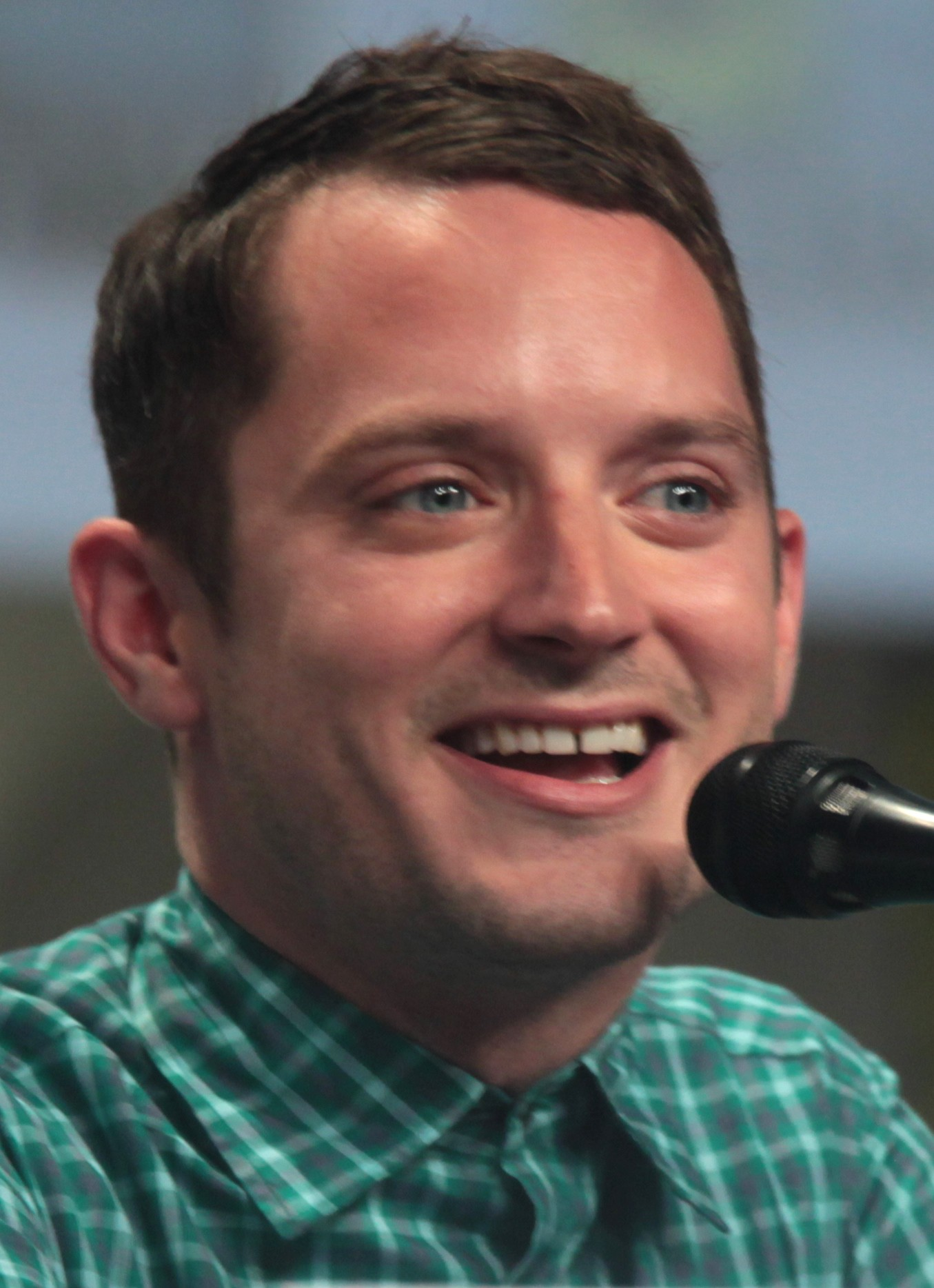
Wood at the 2014 San Diego Comic-Con

Elijah Wood is an American actor and film producer. The following is a filmography of his work.

He made his film debut with a minor part in Back to the Future Part II (1989), then landed a succession of larger roles that made him a critically acclaimed child actor by age 9, being nominated for several Young Artist Awards. As a child actor he starred in the films Radio Flyer (1992), The Good Son (1993), North (1994) and Flipper (1996), and began to transfer to teenage roles in the films The Ice Storm (1997), Deep Impact and The Faculty (both 1998). He is best known for his high-profile leading role as Frodo Baggins in Peter Jackson's The Lord of the Rings trilogy (2001–2003) and its prequel The Hobbit: An Unexpected Journey (2012). He has also starred in critically acclaimed films such as Eternal Sunshine of the Spotless Mind (2004), Sin City (2005), Everything Is Illuminated (2005) and Bobby (2006).

Wood also voiced Mumble in the Happy Feet film series (2006–2011), and the protagonist of the Tim Burton-produced action/science fiction film 9 (2009). In 2005, he started his own record label, Simian Records. He did the voice acting for Spyro in the Legend of Spyro trilogy. In 2012, he began voicing Beck in the animated series Tron: Uprising, and Sigma in the tenth season of the Rooster Teeth series Red vs. Blue. From 2011 to 2014, Wood played the role of Ryan Newman in FX's dark comedy Wilfred.

Key
†	Denotes films that have not yet been released

== Film ==
Year	Title	Role	Notes
1989	Back to the Future Part II	Video Game Boy #2	
1990	Internal Affairs	Sean Stretch	
1990	Avalon	Michael Kaye	
1990	Child in the Night	Luke	
1991	Paradise	Willard Young	
1992	Forever Young	Nat Cooper	
1992	Radio Flyer	Mike	
1993	The Witness	Little Boy	Short film
1993	The Adventures of Huck Finn	Huckleberry Finn	
1993	The Good Son	Mark Evans	
1994	North	North	
1994	The War	Stuart "Stu" Simmons	
1996	Flipper	Sandy Ricks	
1997	The Ice Storm	Mikey Carver	
1998	Deep Impact	Leo Biederman	
1998	The Faculty	Casey Connor	
1999	The Bumblebee Flies Anyway	Barney Snow	
1999	Black and White	Wren	
2000	Chain of Fools	Mikey	
2001	The Lord of the Rings: The Fellowship of the Ring	Frodo Baggins	
2002	Ash Wednesday	Sean Sullivan	
2002	The Adventures of Tom Thumb and Thumbelina	Tom Thumb	Voice role; direct-to-DVD
2002	The Lord of the Rings: The Two Towers	Frodo Baggins	
2002	All I Want	Jones Dillion	
2003	Spy Kids 3-D: Game Over	The Guy	Cameo
2003	The Lord of the Rings: The Return of the King	Frodo Baggins	
2004	Eternal Sunshine of the Spotless Mind	Patrick Wertz	
2005	Sin City	Kevin	
2005	Everything Is Illuminated	Jonathan Safran Foer	
2005	Green Street Hooligans	Matt Buckner	
2006	Bobby	William Avary	
2006	Happy Feet	Mumble	Voice role
2006	Paris, je t'aime	Le garçon	Segment: "Quartier de la Madeleine"
2007	Day Zero	Aaron Feller	
2008	The Oxford Murders	Martin	
2009	9	9	Voice role
2009	Beyond All Boundaries	Cpl. Wilfred Hanson / Capt. John C. Chapin	Voice roles; short film
2010	The Romantics	Chip Hayes	
2010	Full of Regret	Mouse	Short film
2011	Fight for Your Right: Revisited	Ad-Rock	Short film
2011	Happy Feet Two	Mumble	Voice role
2011	I Think Bad Thoughts	Mouse	Short film
2011	The Death and Return of Superman	Hank Henshaw / Cyborg Superman	Short film
2012	Celeste and Jesse Forever	Scott	
2012	Revenge for Jolly!	Thomas	
2012	The Narrative of Victor Karloch	William Merriwether	Voice role; short film
2012	Maniac	Frank	
2012	The Hobbit: An Unexpected Journey	Frodo Baggins	
2013	Pawn Shop Chronicles	Johnny Shaw	
2013	Tome of the Unknown	Wirt	Voice role; short film
2013	Grand Piano	Tom Selznick	
2013	Setup, Punch	Reuben Stein	Short film
2014	Cooties	Clint Hadson	Also producer
2014	A Girl Walks Home Alone at Night	—	Executive producer
2014	Open Windows	Nick Chambers	Also executive producer
2014	The Wind Rises	Sone	Voice role; English dub
2014	Set Fire to the Stars	John Malcolm Brinnin	Also co-producer
2015	The Boy	—	Producer
2015	The Last Witch Hunter	37th Dolan	
2016	The Trust	Sgt. David Waters	
2016	The Greasy Strangler	—	Producer
2017	I Don't Feel at Home in This World Anymore	Tony	
2017	Bitch	—	Producer
2018	Mandy	—	Producer
2018	Seven Stages to Achieve Eternal Bliss	—	Producer
2019	Come to Daddy	Norval Greenwood	
2019	Daniel Isn't Real	—	Producer
2019	Color Out of Space	—	Producer
2020	Archenemy	—	Producer
2021	No Man of God	Bill Hagmaier	Also producer
2023	The Toxic Avenger	Fritz Garbinger	
2024	Bookworm	Strawn Wise	
2024	Ebony & Ivory	—	Executive producer
2025	Rabbit Trap	—	Producer
2025	The Monkey	Ted Hammerman	
2026	Ready or Not 2: Here I Come	The Lawyer	
2027	The Lord of the Rings: The Hunt for Gollum	Frodo Baggins	Filming
TBA	The Land of Nod	—	Producer

== Television ==
Year	Title	Role	Notes
1990	Child in the Night	Luke	Television film
1992	Day-O	Dayo	Television film
1994	Frasier	Ethan	Voice; episode: "Guess Who's Coming to Breakfast"
1996	Adventures from the Book of Virtues	Icarus	Voice; episode: "Responsibility"
1996	Homicide: Life on the Street	McPhee Broadman	Episode: "The True Test"
1997	Oliver Twist	Jack "The Artful Dodger" Dawkins	Television film
2002	The Osbournes	Himself	Episode: "Bark at the Moon"
2003	Saturday Night Live	Himself (host)	Episode: "Elijah Wood/Jet"
2004	King of the Hill	Jason	Voice; episode: "Girl, You'll Be a Giant Soon"
2005	I'm Still Here: Real Diaries of Young People Who Lived During the Holocaust	Klaus Langer / Dawid Rubinowicz	Voices; television documentary
2006	American Dad!	Ethan	Voice; episode: "Iced, Iced Babies"
2006	Freak Show	Freak Mart Squirrel	Voice; episode: "Mohel-Me-Not: Part 1"
2006	Saving a Species: The Great Penguin Rescue	Himself	Host
2006, 2011	Robot Chicken	Various roles	Voice; 2 episodes
2007	Yo Gabba Gabba!	Himself	Episode: "Eat"
2009	Saturday Night Live	Himself	Episode: "Ryan Reynolds/Lady Gaga" (uncredited)
2010	Glenn Martin, DDS	Chester Chislehurst	Voice; episode: "Camp"
2010	Family Guy	Himself	Voice; episode: "Brian Griffin's House of Payne"
2011	Funny or Die Presents	James	Episode: "208"
2011–2014	Wilfred	Ryan Newman	Main role
2012	Treasure Island	Ben Gunn	2 episodes
2012	Red vs. Blue	Sigma	Voice
2012–2013	Tron: Uprising	Beck	Voice; 19 episodes
2014	Over the Garden Wall	Wirt	Voice; 10 episodes
2015–2026	The Late Show with Stephen Colbert	Himself	6 episodes, including the series finale
2016–2017	Dirk Gently's Holistic Detective Agency	Todd Brotzman	18 episodes
2018–2020	Summer Camp Island	Saxophone the Yeti	Voice; 6 episodes
2018–2020	Star Wars Resistance	Jace Rucklin	Voice; 10 episodes
2019	Drunk History	Percy Shelley / John C. Raines	2 episodes
2020	Home Movie: The Princess Bride	Prince Humperdinck	Episode: "Chapter Seven: The Pit Of Despair"
2023	I'm a Virgo	Studious Guy	Episode: "The Universe and My Spirit"
2023	The Afterparty	"Yasper"	Episode: "Vivian and Zoë"
2023–2025	Yellowjackets	Walter Tattersall	Recurring role; 14 episodes
2025	Charlotte's Web	Wilbur	Voice; Miniseries
2025	I Love LA	Himself	Episode: "Upstairses"
2026	Among Us	Green	Voice; 10 episodes

== Video games ==
Year	Title	Voice role	Notes
2002	The Lord of the Rings: The Two Towers	Frodo Baggins	
2003	The Lord of the Rings: The Return of the King	Frodo Baggins	
2004	The Lord of the Rings: The Battle for Middle-Earth	Frodo Baggins	
2006	Happy Feet	Mumble	
2006	The Legend of Spyro: A New Beginning	Spyro the Dragon	
2007	The Legend of Spyro: The Eternal Night	Spyro the Dragon	
2008	The Legend of Spyro: Dawn of the Dragon	Spyro the Dragon	
2010	God of War III	Deimos	Blood pool voice
2012	Lego Lord of the Rings: The Video Game	Frodo Baggins	
2014	Broken Age	Shay	
2014	Lego The Hobbit	Frodo Baggins	
2015	Lego Dimensions	Frodo Baggins	
2018	Transference	—N/a	Artistic director only
2018	11-11: Memories Retold	Harry	
2021	Psychonauts 2	Nick Johnsmith	
2024	Batman: Arkham Shadow	Dr. Jonathan Crane	

== Discography ==
Year	Album	Artist	Song	Note
1994	North (Original Motion Picture Soundtrack)	Marc Shaiman	"A Very Successful Life"	Vocals
2003	Pandemoniumfromamerica	Buckethead & Viggo	"Gone" (with Henry Mortensen & Viggo)	Vocals
2003	Pandemoniumfromamerica	Buckethead & Viggo	"Shadow"	Percussion
2003	Pandemoniumfromamerica	Buckethead & Viggo	"Maybe"	Piano
2003	Pandemoniumfromamerica	Buckethead & Viggo	"Half Fling" (with Dominic Monaghan)	Vocals and lyrics
2008	Trash, Rats & Microphones	Heloise & The Savoir Faire	"On Fuego"	Tape echo and production
2017	Over the Garden Wall (Original Television Soundtrack)	Various	"Adelaide Parade" (with Collin Dean)	Vocals
2017	Over the Garden Wall (Original Television Soundtrack)	Various	"Like Ships" (with Shannyn Sossamon)	Vocals

== Music videos ==
- Paula Abdul: "Forever Your Girl" (1989)
- The Cranberries: "Ridiculous Thoughts" (1995)
- The Apples in Stereo: "Energy" (as director) (2006)
- Greg Laswell: "How the Day Sounds" (2008)
- The Lonely Island: "Threw It On the Ground" (2009)
- Danko Jones: "Full of Regret" (2010)
- The Apples in Stereo: "Dance Floor" (2010)
- Danko Jones: "I Think Bad Thoughts" (2011)
- Beastie Boys: "Make Some Noise" (2011)
- Flying Lotus: "Tiny Tortures" (2012)

== Audiobooks ==
- 1999 The Most Beautiful Gift: A Christmas Story
- 2009 Witch & Wizard
- 2010 Witch & Wizard: The Gift
- 2010 Adventures of Huckleberry Finn. Nominated— Audie Award for Best Audiobook Performance
- 2011 Witch & Wizard: The Fire
