= List of awards and nominations received by Elijah Wood =

Elijah Wood awards and nominations
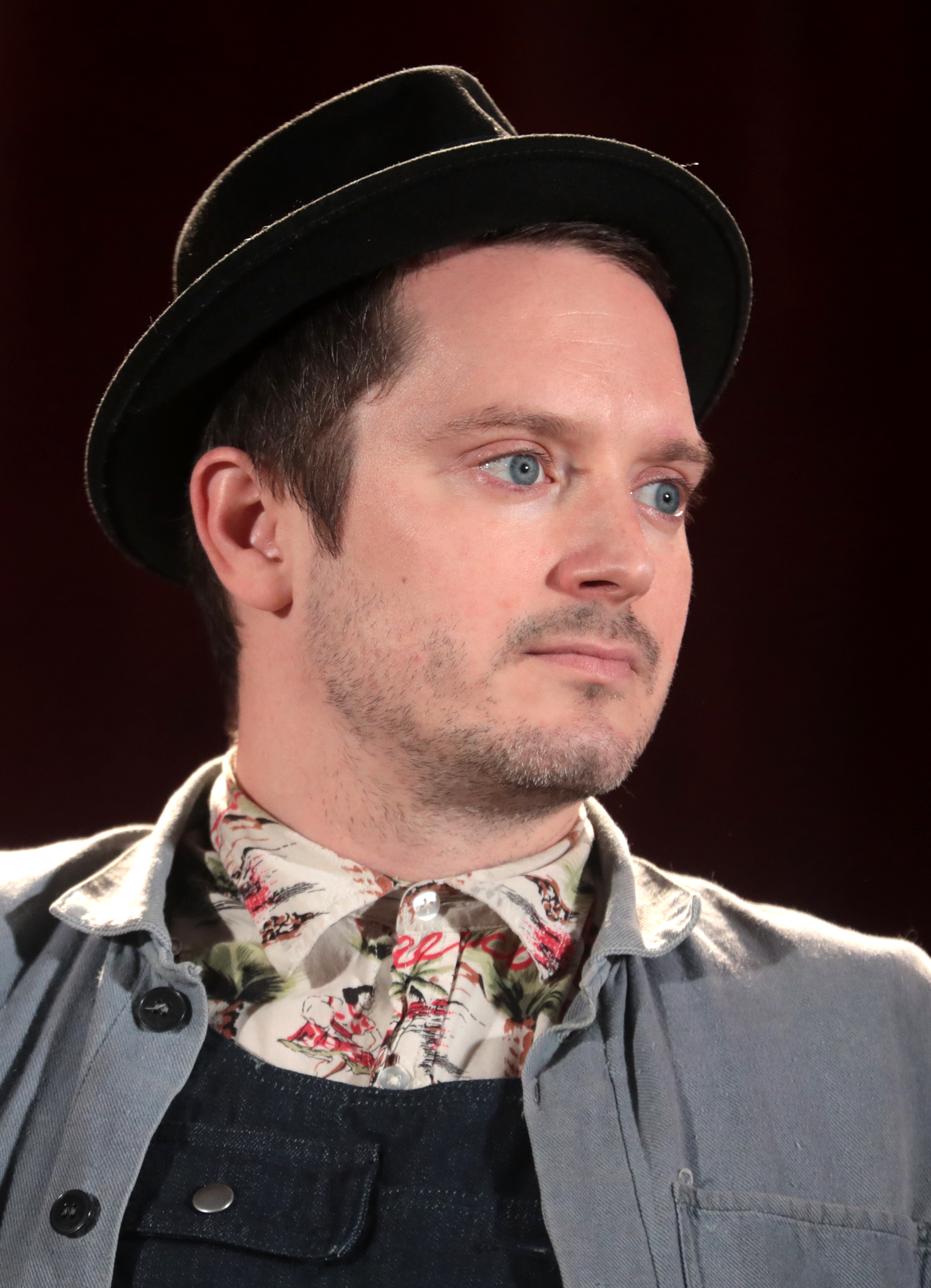
- Wood in 2019
Awards and nominations
Award	Wins	Nominations
Actor Awards	1	2
Interactive Achievement / D.I.C.E. Awards	1	1
Satellite Awards	0	1
Saturn Awards	2	4
Teen Choice Awards	0	4
Young Artist Award	1	8
YoungStar Award	1	3

Totals (Note: Certain award groups do not simply award one winner. They acknowledge several different recipients, have runners-up, and have third place. Since this is a specific recognition and is different from losing an award, runner-up mentions are considered wins in this award tally. For simplification and to avoid errors, each award in this list has been presumed to have had a prior nomination.)
- Wins: 15
- Nominations: 50

Elijah Wood is an actor. In his career, he has won two Saturn Awards, one Screen Actors Guild Awards, one Young Artist Award, and one YoungStar Award.

He is perhaps best known for his role as Frodo Baggins in The Lord of the Rings film trilogy (2001–2003).

== Awards and nominations ==
Award	Year	Categories	Work	Result	Ref.
Audie Award	2012	Award for Literary Fiction	Adventures of Huckleberry Finn	Nominated	
Blockbuster Entertainment Award	1998	Favorite Supporting Actor / Sci-Fi	Deep Impact	Nominated	
Blockbuster Entertainment Award	1998	Favorite Actor / Horror	The Faculty	Nominated	
Critics' Choice Movie Award	2004	Best Acting Ensemble	The Lord of the Rings: The Return of the King	Won	
Critics' Choice Movie Award	2005	Best Acting Ensemble	Sin City	Nominated	
Critics' Choice Movie Award	2006	Best Acting Ensemble	Bobby	Nominated	
Daytime Emmy Award	2007	Performer in a Children/Youth/Family Special	Saving a Species: The Great Penguin Rescue	Nominated	
D.I.C.E. Awards	2019	Immersive Reality Game of the Year	Transference	Nominated	
DVD Exclusive Award	2003	Best Audio Commentary	The Lord of the Rings: The Return of the King	Nominated	
DVD Premiere Award	2001	Best Animated Character Performance	The Adventures of Tom Thumb and Thumbelina	Nominated	
DVD Premiere Award	2002	Best Audio Commentary / New Release	The Lord of the Rings: The Two Towers	Nominated	
Empire Award	2002	Best Actor	The Lord of the Rings: The Fellowship of the Ring	Won	
Fangoria Chainsaw Award	2012	Best Actor	Maniac	Won	
Fright Meter Award	2012	Best Actor in a Leading Role	Maniac	Won	
Hollywood Film Award	2006	Ensemble of the Year	Bobby	Won	
Interactive Achievement Awards	2004	Outstanding Achievement in Character Performance - Male	The Lord of the Rings: The Return of the King	Won	
MTV Movie Award	2002	Best Male Performance	The Lord of the Rings: The Fellowship of the Ring	Nominated	
MTV Movie Award	2003	Best On-Screen Duo (with Sean Astin, Andy Serkis)	The Lord of the Rings: The Two Towers	Nominated	
National Board of Review Award	2003	Best Cast	The Lord of the Rings: The Return of the King	Won	
Nickelodeon Kids' Choice Award	2002	Favorite Male Action Hero	The Lord of the Rings: The Fellowship of the Ring	Nominated	
Nickelodeon Kids' Choice Award	2003	Favorite Male Butt Kicker	The Lord of the Rings: The Two Towers	Nominated	
Online Film Critics Society Award	2002	Best Ensemble	The Lord of the Rings: The Two Towers	Won	
Phoenix Film Critics Society Award	2001	Best Cast	The Lord of the Rings: The Fellowship of the Ring	Won	
Phoenix Film Critics Society Award	2003	Best Cast	The Lord of the Rings: The Return of the King	Nominated	
Satellite Award	2011	Best Actor/ Television Series, Musical or Comedy	Wilfred	Nominated	
Saturn Award	1993	Best Performance by a Younger Actor	The Good Son	Won	
Saturn Award	1994	Best Performance by a Younger Actor	North	Nominated	
Saturn Award	2002	Best Performance by a Younger Actor	The Lord of the Rings: The Two Towers	Nominated	
Saturn Award	2003	Best Actor	The Lord of the Rings: The Return of the King	Won	
Screen Actors Guild Award	2001	Outstanding Performance by a Cast in a Motion Picture	The Lord of the Rings: The Fellowship of the Ring	Nominated	
Screen Actors Guild Award	2002	Outstanding Performance by a Cast in a Motion Picture	The Lord of the Rings: The Two Towers	Nominated	
Screen Actors Guild Award	2003	Outstanding Performance by a Cast in a Motion Picture	The Lord of the Rings: The Return of the King	Won	
SFX Award	2002	Best Sci-Fi / Fantasy Film Actor	The Lord of the Rings: The Two Towers	Nominated	
Teen Choice Award	2002	Choice Movie Actor: Drama/Action Adventure	The Lord of the Rings: The Fellowship of the Ring|	Nominated	
Teen Choice Award	2003	Choice Movie Actor: Drama/Action Adventure	The Lord of the Rings: The Two Towers	Nominated	
Teen Choice Award	2004	Choice Movie Actor: Drama/Action Adventure	The Lord of the Rings: The Return of the King|	Nominated	
Teen Choice Award	2005	Choice Movie: Villain	Sin City	Nominated	
Washington D.C. Area Film Critics Association Award	2004	Best Ensemble	Eternal Sunshine of the Spotless Mind	Won	
Young Artist Award	1990	Best Young Actor Starring in a TV Movie, Pilot or Special	Child in the Night	Nominated	
Young Artist Award	1990	Best Leading Young Actor in a Feature Film	Avalon	Nominated	
Young Artist Award	1991	Best Leading Young Actor in a Feature Film	Paradise	Nominated	
Young Artist Award	1993	Best Leading Young Actor in a Feature Film	Radio Flyer	Won	
Young Artist Award	1994	Best Leading Young Actor in a Feature Film	North	Nominated	
Young Artist Award	1997	Best Performance in a TV Drama Series: Guest Starring Young Actor	Homicide: Life on the Street	Nominated	
Young Artist Award	1998	Best Supporting Young Actor in a Feature Film	The Ice Storm	Nominated	
Young Artist Award	2000	Best Supporting Young Actor in a Feature Film	The Bumblebee Flies Anyway	Nominated	
YoungStar Award	1995	Best Performance by a Young Actor in a Drama Film	The War	Nominated	
YoungStar Award	1997	Best Performance by a Young Actor in a Comedy Film	Flipper	Nominated	
YoungStar Award	1998	Best Young Actor in a Miniseries/ Made-for-TV Movie	Oliver Twist	Won	
YoungStar Award	1998	Best Performance by a Young Actor in a Drama Film	Deep Impact	Nominated	
