= Teen Choice Award for Choice Movie Villain =

The following is a list of the Teen Choice Award winners and nominees for Choice Movie Villain. The award has had several minor name changes:

- From 1999 to 2002, the award was known as Choice Sleazebag.
- In 2003, it was awarded as Choice Villain.
- In 2004, it was awarded as Choice Movie Sleazebag.
- In 2005, the award category was split into Choice Movie Villain and Choice Movie Sleazebag.
- In 2006, the two award categories were merged back into Choice Movie Sleazebag.
- From 2007 to present, it was awarded as Choice Movie Villain.

== Winners and nominees ==
| Year | Actor | Role(s) | Film |
1999
| 1999 | Sarah Michelle Gellar | Kathryn Merteuil | Cruel Intentions |
| 1999 | Chris Cooper | John Hickam | October Sky |
| 1999 | Anjelica Huston | Baroness Rodmilla de Ghent | Ever After: A Cinderella Story |
| 1999 | Andrew Keegan | Joey Donner | 10 Things I Hate About You |
| 1999 | Mike Myers | Dr. Evil | Austin Powers: The Spy Who Shagged Me |
| 1999 | Ray Park | Darth Maul | Star Wars: Episode I – The Phantom Menace |
| 1999 | Ryan Phillippe | Sebastian Valmont | Cruel Intentions |
| 1999 | Matthew Settle | Will Benson | I Still Know What You Did Last Summer |
2000
| 2000 | Mike Myers | Fat Bastard | Austin Powers: The Spy Who Shagged Me |
| 2000 | Ben Affleck | Jim Young | Boiler Room |
| 2000 | Andy Dick | Motel Clerk | Road Trip |
| 2000 | Scott Foley | Roman Bridger | Scream 3 |
| 2000 | James Franco | Chris Campbell | Whatever It Takes |
| 2000 | Helen Mirren | Mrs. Eve Tingle | Teaching Mrs. Tingle |
| 2000 | Trevor Morgan | Tommy Tammisimo | The Sixth Sense |
| 2000 | Seann William Scott | Steve Stifler | American Pie |
2001
| 2001 | Dwayne Johnson (listed as The Rock) | The Scorpion King | The Mummy Returns |
| 2001 | Candice Bergen | Kathy Morningside | Miss Congeniality |
| 2001 | Victor Garber | Professor Callahan | Legally Blonde |
| 2001 | Iain Glen | Manfred Powell | Lara Croft: Tomb Raider |
| 2001 | Anthony Hopkins | Dr. Hannibal Lecter | Hannibal |
| 2001 | Sam Rockwell | Eric Knox | Charlie's Angels |
| 2001 | Rufus Sewell | Count Adhemar | A Knight's Tale |
| 2001 | Rick Yune | Johnny Tran | The Fast and the Furious |
2002
| 2002 | Seann William Scott | Steve Stifler | American Pie 2 |
| 2002 | Lara Flynn Boyle | Serleena | Men in Black II |
| 2002 | Willem Dafoe | Norman Osborn / Green Goblin | Spider-Man |
| 2002 | Will Ferrell | Jacobim Mugatu | Zoolander |
| 2002 | Andy García | Terry Benedict | Ocean's Eleven |
| 2002 | Christopher Lee | Saruman the White | The Lord of the Rings: The Fellowship of the Ring |
| 2002 | Christopher Lee | Count Dooku / Darth Tyranus | Star Wars: Episode II – Attack of the Clones |
| 2002 | Ian McDiarmid | Chancellor Palpatine / Darth Sidious | Star Wars: Episode II – Attack of the Clones |
| 2002 | Mike Myers | Dr. Evil / Goldmember | Austin Powers in Goldmember |
2003
| 2003 | Colin Farrell | Bullseye | Daredevil |
| 2003 | Christina Applegate | Christine Montgomery | View from the Top |
| 2003 | Candice Bergen | Mayor Kate Hennings | Sweet Home Alabama |
| 2003 | Brian Cox | Colonel William Stryker | X2: X-Men United |
| 2003 | Richard Gere | Billy Flynn | Chicago |
| 2003 | Christian Kane | Peter Prentiss | Just Married |
| 2003 | Ian McKellen | Erik Lehnsherr / Magneto | X2: X-Men United |
| 2003 | Michael Michele | Judy Spears | How to Lose a Guy in 10 Days |
2004
| 2004 | Seann William Scott | Steve Stifler | American Wedding |
| 2004 | Kirsten Dunst | Betty Warren | Mona Lisa Smile |
| 2004 | Judy Greer | Lucy "Tom-Tom" Wyman | 13 Going on 30 |
| 2004 | Rachel McAdams | Regina George | Mean Girls |
| 2004 | Mandy Moore | Hilary Faye Stockard | Saved! |
| 2004 | Andy Serkis | Sméagol Trahald / Gollum | The Lord of the Rings: The Return of the King |
| 2004 | Sarah Silverman | Patty Di Marco | School of Rock |
| 2004 | Billy Bob Thornton | Willie T. Soke | Bad Santa |
| 2005 | Choice Movie Villain | | |
| 2005 | Jim Carrey | Count Olaf | Lemony Snicket's A Series of Unfortunate Events |
| 2005 | Gisele Bündchen | Vanessa | Taxi |
| 2005 | Hayden Christensen | Anakin Skywalker / Darth Vader | Star Wars: Episode III – Revenge of the Sith |
| 2005 | James Cromwell | Warden Rudolph Hazen | The Longest Yard |
| 2005 | Tom Cruise | Vincent | Collateral |
| 2005 | Ian McDiarmid | Chancellor Palpatine / Darth Sidious | Star Wars: Episode III – Revenge of the Sith |
| 2005 | Alfred Molina | Otto Octavius / Doctor Octopus | Spider-Man 2 |
| 2005 | Elijah Wood | Kevin | Sin City |
| 2005 | Choice Movie Sleazebag | | |
| 2005 | Jennifer Coolidge | Fiona | A Cinderella Story |
| 2005 | Kevin Bacon | Jorge Christophe | Beauty Shop |
| 2005 | Brian Bosworth | Guard Garner | The Longest Yard |
| 2005 | Will Ferrell | Phil Weston | Kicking & Screaming |
| 2005 | Jane Fonda | Viola Fields | Monster-in-Law |
| 2005 | Jon Gries | Rico Dynamite | Napoleon Dynamite |
| 2005 | Johnny Knoxville | Topper Burks | Lords of Dogtown |
| 2005 | Vince Vaughn | Roger "Raji" Lowenthal | Be Cool |
2006
| 2006 | Bill Nighy | Davy Jones | Pirates of the Caribbean: Dead Man's Chest |
| 2006 | Jack Black | Carl Denham | King Kong |
| 2006 | Ian McKellen | Sir Leigh Teabing | The Da Vinci Code |
| 2006 | Ian McKellen | Erik Lehnsherr / Magneto | X-Men: The Last Stand |
| 2006 | Cillian Murphy | Jackson Rippner | Red Eye |
| 2006 | Kevin Spacey | Lex Luthor | Superman Returns |
| 2006 | Meryl Streep | Miranda Priestly | The Devil Wears Prada |
2007
| 2007 | Bill Nighy | Davy Jones | Pirates of the Caribbean: At World's End |
| 2007 | Topher Grace | Eddie Brock / Venom | Spider-Man 3 |
| 2007 | Julian McMahon | Victor Von Doom / Dr. Doom | Fantastic Four: Rise of the Silver Surfer |
| 2007 | Al Pacino | Willy Bank | Ocean's Thirteen |
| 2007 | Hugo Weaving | Megatron (voice) | Transformers |
2008
| 2008 | Johnny Depp | Benjamin Barker / Sweeney Todd | Sweeney Todd: The Demon Barber of Fleet Street |
| 2008 | Cate Blanchett | Irina Spalko | Indiana Jones and the Kingdom of the Crystal Skull |
| 2008 | Jeff Bridges | Obadiah Stane / Iron Monger | Iron Man |
| 2008 | Samuel L. Jackson | Roland Cox | Jumper |
| 2008 | Susan Sarandon | Queen Narissa | Enchanted |
2009
| 2009 | Cam Gigandet | James Witherdale | Twilight |
| 2009 | Hank Azaria | Kahmunrah | Night at the Museum: Battle of the Smithsonian |
| 2009 | Eric Bana | Captain Nero | Star Trek |
| 2009 | Ken Jeong | Leslie Chow | The Hangover |
| 2009 | Liev Schreiber | Victor Creed / Sabretooth | X-Men Origins: Wolverine |
2010
| 2010 | Rachelle Lefevre | Victoria Sutherland | The Twilight Saga: New Moon |
| 2010 | Joseph Gordon-Levitt | Rex Lewis / Cobra Commander | G.I. Joe: The Rise of Cobra |
| 2010 | Stephen Lang | Colonel Miles Quaritch | Avatar |
| 2010 | Christopher Mintz-Plasse | Chris D'Amico / Red Mist | Kick-Ass |
| 2010 | Mickey Rourke | Ivan Vanko / Whiplash | Iron Man 2 |
2011
| 2011 | Tom Felton | Draco Malfoy | Harry Potter and the Deathly Hallows – Part 1 |
| 2011 | Kevin Bacon | Sebastian Shaw | X-Men: First Class |
| 2011 | Bryce Dallas Howard | Victoria Sutherland | The Twilight Saga: Eclipse |
| 2011 | Ian McShane | Blackbeard | Pirates of the Caribbean: On Stranger Tides |
| 2011 | Leighton Meester | Rebecca Evans | The Roommate |
2012
| 2012 | Alexander Ludwig | Cato | The Hunger Games |
| 2012 | Jemaine Clement | Boris the Animal | Men in Black 3 |
| 2012 | Tom Hiddleston | Loki | The Avengers |
| 2012 | Rhys Ifans | Dr. Curt Connors / Lizard | The Amazing Spider-Man |
| 2012 | Charlize Theron | Queen Ravenna | Snow White and the Huntsman |
2013
| 2013 | Adam DeVine | Bumper Allen | Pitch Perfect |
| 2013 | Javier Bardem | Raoul Silva | Skyfall |
| 2013 | Tom Hardy | Bane | The Dark Knight Rises |
| 2013 | Ben Kingsley | Trevor Slattery | Iron Man 3 |
| 2013 | Melissa McCarthy | Dawn Budgie / Diana | Identity Thief |
2014
| 2014 | Donald Sutherland | President Coriolanus Snow | The Hunger Games: Catching Fire |
| 2014 | Michael Fassbender | Erik Lehnsherr / Magneto | X-Men: Days of Future Past |
| 2014 | Jamie Foxx | Max Dillon / Electro | The Amazing Spider-Man 2 |
| 2014 | Kelsey Grammer | Harold Attinger | Transformers: Age of Extinction |
| 2014 | Kate Winslet | Jeanine Matthews | Divergent |
2015
| 2015 | Bella Thorne | Madison Morgan | The DUFF |
| 2015 | Rose Byrne | Rayna Boyanov | Spy |
| 2015 | Vincent D'Onofrio | Vic Hoskins | Jurassic World |
| 2015 | Jason Statham | Deckard Shaw | Furious 7 |
| 2015 | Donald Sutherland | President Coriolanus Snow | The Hunger Games: Mockingjay – Part 1 |
| 2015 | Kate Winslet | Jeanine Matthews | The Divergent Series: Insurgent |
2016
| 2016 | Adam Driver | Kylo Ren | Star Wars: The Force Awakens |
| 2016 | Daniel Brühl | Helmut Zemo | Captain America: Civil War |
| 2016 | Jesse Eisenberg | Lex Luthor | Batman v Superman: Dawn of Justice |
| 2016 | Aidan Gillen | Janson | Maze Runner: The Scorch Trials |
| 2016 | Ed Skrein | Francis Freeman / Ajax | Deadpool |
| 2016 | Charlize Theron | Queen Ravenna | The Huntsman: Winter's War |
2017
| 2017 | Luke Evans | Gaston | Beauty and the Beast |
| 2017 | Elizabeth Banks | Rita Repulsa | Power Rangers |
| 2017 | Javier Bardem | Captain Armando Salazar | Pirates of the Caribbean: Dead Men Tell No Tales |
| 2017 | Priyanka Chopra | Victoria Leeds | Baywatch |
| 2017 | James McAvoy | Kevin Wendell Crumb | Split |
| 2017 | Charlize Theron | Cipher | The Fate of the Furious |
2018
| 2018 | Michael B. Jordan | N'Jadaka / Erik "Killmonger" Stevens | Black Panther |
| 2018 | Cate Blanchett | Hela | Thor: Ragnarok |
| 2018 | Josh Brolin | Thanos | Avengers: Infinity War |
| 2018 | Adam Driver | Kylo Ren | Star Wars: The Last Jedi |
| 2018 | Aidan Gillen | Janson | Maze Runner: The Death Cure |
| 2018 | Bill Skarsgård | It / Pennywise the Dancing Clown | It |
2019
| 2019 | Josh Brolin | Thanos | Avengers: Endgame |
| 2019 | Johnny Depp | Gellert Grindelwald | Fantastic Beasts: The Crimes of Grindelwald |
| 2019 | Marwan Kenzari | Jafar | Aladdin |
| 2019 | Jude Law | Yon-Rogg | Captain Marvel |
| 2019 | Mark Strong | Dr. Thaddeus Sivana | Shazam! |
| 2019 | Patrick Wilson | Orm Marius / Ocean Master | Aquaman |
