= Goldie and Wendy =

- Sin City character
- Jaime King as Goldie (left) and Wendy (right)
- First appearance: The Hard Goodbye (April 1991–May 1992).
- Created by: Frank Miller
- Portrayed by: Jaime King
- Publisher: Dark Horse Comics

In-universe information
- Full name: Goldie and Wendy
- Gender: Female (both)
- Occupation: Prostitute (both)
- Affiliation: Gail; Marv
- Residence: Basin City

Goldie and Wendy are fictional identical twins in the graphic novel series Sin City, created by Frank Miller. In the 2005 film adaptation, they are played by Jaime King. They are blond, dark-eyed femmes fatale.

They first appeared in The Hard Goodbye, followed by appearances in A Dame to Kill For and And Behind Door Number Three?

== The Hard Goodbye ==
One night, Goldie offers sexual services to Marv, and he immediately falls in love with her. They spend the night together, but in the morning Marv wakes up to find Goldie lying in bed next to him, murdered. He hears the sound of the police outside the building, coming for him. He escapes, killing many of the police as he does.

Wendy and Gail capture Marv, believing that he killed Goldie. They tie Marv in a chair and try to torture a confession out of him, but he unties himself and Wendy realizes that he is not her sister's murderer. Later they discover that Cardinal Roark used Kevin, a cannibalistic serial killer, to murder Goldie and frame Marv. Wendy and Marv go to the Roark farm, and while Wendy waits in the car, Marv tortures and kills Kevin. Marv finds and kills Cardinal Roark, but is seen doing it by the police. He is sentenced to the electric chair. When Wendy comes to visit him in prison, Marv mistakenly calls her Goldie and apologizes. She answers "Call me Goldie" and they kiss madly. Later, after several failed attempts, the authorities manage to electrocute Marv.

== A Dame to Kill For ==
Marv and Dwight McCarthy go to Old Town, place where the twin sisters work. Goldie offers sexual services to Marv and he accepts, and that makes the beginning of "The Hard Goodbye" storyline.

== And Behind Door Number Three? ==
This is a short story about Gail and Wendy (who's now wearing Marv's necklace) setting a trap for a man they suspect is 'carving up' girls in Old Town. After Wendy lures him in doors, Gail shoots him in the knee and ties him up. The story ends with Miho coming in to torture him.

== Film appearance ==
Both twins are portrayed by Jaime King in the 2005 film adaptation as the two twins in the second story in the film The Hard Goodbye. The actress reprises her role in the 2014 sequel based on A Dame to Kill For. In the former film, they are both blondes and look identical.

In the latter film Goldie is shown in full color as a blonde who wears a white dress; Wendy is shown in black-and-white as a blonde who wears a black dress and carries a pistol in an Old West gunbelt (as her role as an Old Town enforcer). Commenting on that visual difference, Color and the Moving Image indicates that it shows that the first is Marv's love interest, describing the scene when Wendy, visiting Mark in prison, is mistaken for Goldie and thus briefly coloured (hair, lips) before fading back to black-and-white when the character realises his error.

== Interpretation ==
Katherine Farrimond wrote that Goldie, whose corpse "unsullied by murder" "resembles an idealised object" haunts and guides Marv in his actions, while her sister "initially functions as a haunting vengeful double". Véronique Sina noted that "Marv isn't always able to easily distinguish the two doppelgangers from one another. Accordingly, Marv repeatedly calls Wendy Goldie throughout the film."

Commenting on the performance of the actress and her importance in the economy of the film, Whatculture wrote: "Actress Jaime King may not have been able to make a huge impression solely due to the fact she spent nearly all her time in the shadow of Mickey Rourke's performance, but her looks and ability to slip adeptly into the tone of the film made her a vital cog in the machine that helped it all work smoothly."
