= The Hard Goodbye =

Comic book by Frank Miller

- Cover of the first edition of the trade paperback collected edition of "The Hard Goodbye"
- Publisher: Dark Horse
- Publication date: April 1991 – May 1992
- Genre: Crime
- Title(s): Dark Horse Presents: Fifth Anniversary Special; Dark Horse Presents #51–62
- Main character(s): Marv; Goldie and Wendy; Kevin; Cardinal Roark

Creative team
- Writer: Frank Miller
- Artist: Frank Miller
- Letterer: Frank Miller
- Editor: Randy Stradley
- The Hard Goodbye: ISBN 1-59307-293-7

"The Hard Goodbye" is the first story in the American Sin City comics series. It was serialized, as "Sin City", in the comics anthology Dark Horse Presents by Dark Horse Comics and named "The Hard Goodbye" in the trade paperbacks. It was created by Frank Miller, and led to a metaseries that has been adapted into a movie.

== Publication history ==
The first episode of the comic was published as "Sin City" in the anthology Dark Horse Presents: 5th Anniversary Special (April 1991) and starting with episode two, was published as a continuing series in Dark Horse Presents issues #51–62 (June 1991–June 1992). The series was written, drawn and lettered by Frank Miller.

The original issues were edited by Randy Stradley, and Diana Schutz is editor of the 2005 collected edition.

== Summary ==
"The Hard Goodbye" begins with the protagonist, Marv, being accused of the murder of the beautiful prostitute, Goldie. Marv is an ex-military man and a trained professional killer, so naturally framing him would be easy. However, he felt connected to Goldie and spent one night with her before her tragic death. The night of her murder she and Marv got drunk, made love, and fell asleep together. Three hours later, Marv wakes up and finds Goldie dead. He wonders why she would agree to sleep with him and he refers to her as his own personal heaven in the hell that he calls Sin City. Suddenly the cop sirens grow closer and louder, which makes Marv slip out on to the streets of Sin City. Marv has become a prime suspect when he is framed for Goldie's murder. During this time, a serial killer is on the loose in Sin City who preys on prostitutes and eats them.

Marv becomes determined to find Goldie's killer and immediately goes to his mother's house to retrieve his gun. His mother informs him that some men came by the house looking for him. Marv goes to the bar to hide out, but two assassins come and attack him. Before he kills the two men, he forces them to tell him who sent them. Continuing his investigation, he is led to a priest who then tells him to question the leading family in Sin City and the cardinal of the church, Roark. Marv follows the trail of clues to an abandoned farm where the mute serial killer, Kevin, is keeping his victims' heads as trophies. He also discovers that Kevin kidnapped his parole officer, Lucille, and has eaten her hand. Marv and Lucille manage to escape. Although, when the cops show up to the scene, Lucille is murdered by a corrupt cop. Marv is able to escape the cops but not before he forces their leader to reveal Roark's name.

During Marv's journey he comes across Goldie's twin sister, Wendy. Wendy is also a prostitute, and together they decide to go after the cardinal. At the farm, Marv beats, dismembers and feeds Kevin to his pet wolf. Marv brings Kevin’s head to the cardinal and Roark confesses to his crimes, especially Goldie's murder and his obsession with eating women. Marv brutally kills him as the police break in and shoot him. Marv survives, is tried for all of his crimes. The authorities force him to confess to Goldie's murder and the murder of the other prostitutes when they threaten his mother. He sentenced to death. Before his death, Marv only finds comfort while incarcerated in his visits from Wendy, in which he shares tales of his time spent with Goldie. The story ends with Marv being executed by electric chair.

=== Collected edition ===
It was collected as a trade paper-back named Sin City in 1992, and then subtitled The Hard Goodbye in January 1993 featuring several different cover designs over its multiple printings/titles. The series was reprinted in smaller sized digest-trades to tie-into the film, with covers designed by Chip Kidd.

== Awards ==
The story has received a number of awards:

- 1992:
  - Nominated for "Best Single Issue or Story" Eisner Award
  - Frank Miller was nominated for "Best Writer/Artist or Writer/Artist Team" Eisner Award, for Sin City
  - Frank Miller was nominated for "Best Artist" Eisner Award, for Sin City
- 1993:
  - Won "Best Graphic Album: Reprint (Modern Material)" Eisner Award
  - Frank Miller won "Best Penciller/Inker, Black & White Publication" Eisner Award, for Sin City
  - Frank Miller won "Best Writer/Artist" Eisner Award, for Sin City
  - Nominated for "Best Serialized Story" Eisner Award, for Dark Horse Presents #58-62
  - Frank Miller was nominated for "Best Writer" Eisner Award, for Sin City

== Cinematic adaptation ==
In 2005, this was one of the stories adapted into the film Sin City. "The Babe Wore Red and Other Stories", "The Hard Goodbye", The Big Fat Kill, That Yellow Bastard plot lines were all used in the film. Actor Mickey Rourke played the role of Marv. The segment also starred Jaime King as Goldie/Wendy, Rutger Hauer as Cardinal Roark, Elijah Wood as Kevin and Carla Gugino as Lucille.
