= John Hartigan (Sin City) =

- Sin City character
- Bruce Willis as Detective John Hartigan in Sin City
- First appearance: That Yellow Bastard
- Created by: Frank Miller
- Portrayed by: Bruce Willis
- Publisher: Dark Horse Comics

In-universe information
- Full name: John Hartigan
- Gender: Male
- Affiliation(s): Nancy Callahan
- Residence: Basin City

Detective John Hartigan is a major protagonist in the Sin City series of graphic novels, written by Frank Miller. He is the central character in That Yellow Bastard, and has a small cameo in Just Another Saturday Night. Miller has announced he will be the main character of another story, set before That Yellow Bastard.

In the 2005 film adaptation, Hartigan is portrayed by Bruce Willis.

== Appearance ==
At the start of That Yellow Bastard, Hartigan is "pushing 60." He has a distinguishing cross-shaped scar on his forehead. He is presented as a muscular and imposing man, capable of holding his own in almost any fight. He also has angina, which consistently affects his work, despite his attempts to ignore and fight through it. He is almost always dressed professionally, most commonly wearing an oxford shirt, tie, and dress slacks, along with his signature trenchcoat.

== Personality ==
A veteran police detective of Basin City, Hartigan is gruff, stoic, and cynical. He is also completely selfless; he cares little about his own well-being as long as he can protect his fellow citizens. He risks his own safety and reputation to achieve safety for those he cares about, but this dedication eventually destroys his life. Hartigan possesses a seemingly indomitable will, able to withstand multiple bullet wounds without collapsing, and most notably being capable of willing himself back to life after being hanged. Hartigan has a distinctive way of narrating: he often talks to himself in his head, referring to himself as "stupid old man".

Det. John Hartigan on the cover of Sin City: That Yellow Bastard 2nd Edition.

== In That Yellow Bastard ==
Hartigan's last case prior to his retirement is the investigation of a serial killer and rapist who preys on prepubescent girls. He eventually discovers that the killer is in fact Roark Junior, the son of Basin City's most powerful family. Despite rampant corruption in the legal system and numerous attempts on his life by Senator Roark (the killer's father), he pursues the case.

On his last night on the job, Hartigan is called to rescue Junior's newest intended victim, 11-year-old Nancy Callahan. His partner Bob (who is secretly on the Roark family's payroll) begs him to let the case go, but Hartigan refuses, punching Bob out and proceeding to the crime scene alone. Once there, he dispatches Roark Junior's henchmen and brutally punishes Roark Junior, shooting off the rapist's left ear, right hand, and genitals. Before Hartigan can kill Junior, however, Bob arrives on the scene and shoots Hartigan in the back several times, and in the chest shortly thereafter.

That night, Senator Roark visits Hartigan in the hospital, telling Hartigan that he will be framed for raping Nancy, and threatens to kill anyone who knows the truth. He pays to cure Hartigan's angina to ensure the detective will suffer as long as possible. Hartigan never confesses to the crime during the trial, but he does not say a word concerning Junior's guilt and allows himself to be convicted as a child molester. Over the next eight years, everyone he loves abandons him — except for Nancy, who worships him and writes him a letter every week. Nancy becomes his only reason to live; he accepts his fate so long as he believes she is safe.

Hartigan as drawn by Frank Miller.

Eight years later, the letters stop coming. At first, Hartigan suspects Nancy has simply outgrown him. However, someone then sends him a letter containing a human finger, and a stranger with bright yellow skin and a horrible odor visits Hartigan in person. Afraid for Nancy's safety, Hartigan confesses to raping her at his next parole hearing so he can protect her. With Senator Roark's approval, Hartigan is granted parole. Hartigan then seeks out Nancy at her last known address, a strip club known as Kadie's Bar. Nancy rushes into his arms and kisses him upon his arrival, and after their brief reunion, Hartigan realizes that he has been tricked into revealing Nancy's location. He flees the bar with Nancy, hiding in a cheap motel to try to evade the Roarks. During their stay at the motel, Hartigan resists Nancy's advances, albeit reluctantly. The stranger from earlier then finds and kidnaps both of them, revealing himself to be none other than Junior, alive but horribly disfigured by the medical treatments he underwent to repair the damage Hartigan caused. He leaves Hartigan at the end of a noose to die.

Through sheer force of will, he escapes from the trap and pursues Junior and Nancy back to the Roark family farm, where he rescues Nancy and then re-castrates Junior (this time with his bare hands) before beating him to death. After sharing a kiss with Nancy, he instructs her to leave the farm, telling her he will expose the Roarks and clear his name. However, upon her departure, he commits suicide with his own gun, narrating that this is the only way to truly protect Nancy from the Roark family.

== Film appearance ==
Hartigan is portrayed by Bruce Willis in the 2005 film adaptation of Sin City. According to many interviews, Willis, upon seeing one or two minutes of The Customer is Always Right short that Robert Rodriguez had brought with him as a proof of concept tool to get actors and other talent (most notably Frank Miller) on board, paused the DVD, turned to Rodriguez and said that whatever he saw from that point onwards, he wanted to be part of the project. Michael Douglas was considered for the role before Willis came on board.

Willis reprised the role in 2014's Sin City: A Dame to Kill For, where he portrayed Hartigan's ghost. He continues to watch over Nancy, attempting to dissuade her from avenging his death. He ultimately saves her from her would-be murderer, Senator Roark, by distracting him just long enough for her to kill the Senator.

== Reception ==
The character, a typical Millerian antihero, is described as "a detective who becomes a protective father figure to a young girl he saves from sexual assault and murder" by Hannah Hamad. According to Richard Quantz, he belongs to a type of stock characters that is a variation on detective roles, and without whom in the economy of the fictions, the world would collapse into evil Joe Street compared the character to that of Harry Callahan.
