= Freddy Quezada =

Nicaraguan Academic (born 1958)

Freddy Antonio Quezada
- Born: 1958 (age 67–68); Managua, Nicaragua.
- Occupations: Academic; Philosopher; Sociologist

Detention
- Country: Nicaragua
- Detained: November 29, 2023
- Charge: 'Incitement of Hatred'
- Released: September 5, 2024
- 9 months and 7 days

Freddy Antonio Quezada is a retired Nicaraguan academic who most recently taught at the National Autonomous University of Nicaragua. In November 2023, he was arrested by Nicaraguan authorities which, according to some sources, was in the aftermath of his liking a post on X (formerly Twitter), critical of the government of Daniel Ortega. Quezada was released from detention in September 2024, and subsequently sent to exile in Guatemala.

== Academic career ==
Prior to his employment as a professor at the National Autonomous University of Nicaragua, which ended in 2018 after he was fired, Freddy Quezada was a faculty member at the Central American University, Managua, and the Polytechnic University of Nicaragua, which were seized by the state in 2022 and 2023 respectively. Literary Review describes him as "[someone who has] taught generations of Nicaraguan journalists and sociologists and actively promotes critical thinking".

== Dissidence ==
Prior to his 2023 arrest, Quezada was fired from the National Autonomous University of Nicaragua during the 2018 Nicaraguan protests, in which 300-600 protesters were killed, after his criticism of the government's "violent crackdown" of student protesters. In 2023, Quezada voiced his criticism of the Nicaraguan government, calling it a "dictatorship", and condemned its treatment of Catholic bishop Rolando José Álvarez Lagos, who was charged for "undermining national integrity and propagation of false news through information and communication technologies to the detriment of the State and Nicaraguan society" and placed under house arrest in December 2022.

== 2023 arrest and imprisonment ==
On November 29, 2023, Quezada was arrested at his residence in Managua, immediately after his social media activity criticising the Ortega government. According to PEN International, Quezada's family was not informed regarding his arrest for another 5 days. PEN International further states that on 5 December 2023, Quezada was transferred to the Jorge Navarro Penitentiary System in Tipitapa (colloquially known as 'La Modelo' and known for its harsh conditions) without legal representation and was not informed of his reason for arrest.

In January or February, 2024, Quezada was found guilty of "incitement to hatred". Quezada claimed, following his release in 2024, that he was never informed about the specifics of his prison sentence after almost 10 months in prison.

According to Quezada's daughter, Adriana, he suffers from diabetes, partial deafness, and physical frailty, raising concerns about his health in prison. According to his family, they were not allowed to see him or establish contact with him during his imprisonment. Quezada stated that conditions improved towards the end of his imprisonment.

== Release and exile ==
Quezada was released from prison and sent into exile in Guatemala in early September, 2024, along with 134 other political prisoners, being religious, social, and political figures. The release followed U.S. diplomatic efforts and was announced by Jacob Sullivan. As part of the deal, the prisoners will be able to move to the United States. Following the release and exile, all 135 figures were stripped of Nicaraguan citizenship and had their property seized by the government.

== See also ==
- 2018 Nicaraguan protests
