= Ridiculous Thoughts =

1995 single by the Cranberries

Single by the Cranberries

from the album No Need to Argue
- Released: 31 July 1995
- Length: 4:33 (album version); 3:36 (radio edit)
- Label: Island
- Composers: Dolores O'Riordan; Noel Hogan
- Lyricist: Dolores O'Riordan
- Producer: Stephen Street

The Cranberries singles chronology
"I Can't Be with You" (1995)	"Ridiculous Thoughts" (1995)	"Salvation" (1996)

Music video
- "Ridiculous Thoughts" on YouTube

"Ridiculous Thoughts" is a song by Irish rock band the Cranberries, released in July 1995 by Island Records as the fourth single (third in North America) from their second studio album, No Need to Argue (1994). The song peaked at number 20 on the UK Singles Chart and number 23 in their native Ireland. Its music video was directed by Samuel Bayer, featuring Elijah Wood. In 2017, the song was released as an acoustic, stripped-down version on the band's Something Else album.

== Background and writing ==
"Ridiculous Thoughts" was recorded at The Manor Studios, Oxford and Townhouse Studios, London, during the 1994 sessions for No Need to Argue. The music for "Ridiculous Thoughts" was written by Dolores O'Riordan and Noel Hogan. The lyrics were written by O'Riordan about her problems with British press and journalists. It was produced and engineered by Stephen Street.

== Release and chart performance ==
"Ridiculous Thoughts" was released as a commercial single on 31 July 1995. It had mild success in Ireland, reaching number 23, and some success in both the UK and the U.S. As most of the Cranberries' singles in the United States, a physical CD single was not released commercially, so it did not chart on the Billboard Hot 100. It did peak at number 14 on the US Billboard Modern Rock Tracks chart.

== Critical reception ==
David Quantick from NME wrote, "That woman sings like her off The Cocteau Twins crossed with a Dalek and all their songs have crap tunes with a bit in the middle where the woman can soar like an eagle o'er the melody."

== Music video ==
The video clip for "Ridiculous Thoughts" was directed in May 1995 by Samuel Bayer and later redone by the band, using the pseudonym "Freckles Flynn". The band is shown in front of the freaks of a circus signs (monkey rodeo, rubber skin man, etc.) on a deserted location. It features a young Elijah Wood, who tries to follow a radio signal all around the ruins of a building. O'Riordan stated that the band did not understand or identify with the concept that Bayer had shown in the video, and thus, they decided to redo it, mixing the original tape with live footage from their American Tour. The original version of the video was later included on Stars: The Best of Videos 1992–2002 DVD.

== Track listings ==
- CD single (UK, Australia, Spain)
1. "Ridiculous Thoughts" (album version) – 4:31
2. "Linger" (album version) – 4:34
3. "Twenty One" (live at The Point, Dublin) – 3:05
4. "Ridiculous Thoughts" (live at The Point, Dublin) – 6:08
- CD single (France, Japan)
1. "Ridiculous Thoughts" (album version) – 4:31
2. "I Can't Be With You" (live at The Point, Dublin) – 3:10
3. "Twenty One" (live at The Point, Dublin) – 3:05
4. "Ridiculous Thoughts" (live at The Point, Dublin) – 6:08
- 7-inch single
1. "Ridiculous Thoughts" (album version) – 4:31
2. "Linger" (album version) – 4:34

== Charts ==
Chart (1995)	Peak position
Australia (ARIA)	60
Europe (Eurochart Hot 100)	63
Ireland (IRMA)	23
Netherlands (Dutch Top 40 Tipparade)	12
Netherlands (Single Top 100 Tipparade)	13
New Zealand (Recorded Music NZ)	43
Scotland Singles (OCC)	22
UK Singles (OCC)	20
US Alternative Airplay (Billboard)	14

== Release history ==
Region	Date	Format(s)	Label(s)	Ref.
United States	6 June 1995	Contemporary hit radio	Island	
United Kingdom	31 July 1995	7-inch vinyl; CD; cassette	Island	
Japan	29 November 1995	CD	Island	
