= Happy Feet (video game) =

2006 video game

- PAL region cover art for the Nintendo DS
- Developers: Artificial Mind and Movement; Capybara Games (J2ME)
- Publisher: Midway
- Platforms: Microsoft Windows, PlayStation 2, GameCube, Nintendo DS, Game Boy Advance, Mobile phone, Wii
- Release: NA: November 14, 2006; EU: November 24, 2006; Mobile: NA: November 17, 2006; Wii: NA: November 19, 2006; EU: December 8, 2006
- Genre: Action-adventure
- Modes: Single-player, multiplayer

Happy Feet is an action-adventure game based on the comedy movie of the same name. It was released in 2006 by Midway (publisher) and A2M (developer) for the PlayStation 2, GameCube, Game Boy Advance, Nintendo DS, Wii, and Microsoft Windows. Elijah Wood, Brittany Murphy, Elizabeth Daily, Dee Bradley Baker, and Carlos Alazraqui all reprise their voice roles from the film.

Upon release, the game received mixed to negative reviews across all platforms.

== Gameplay ==
The console versions (for PlayStation 2, GameCube, Wii, and Microsoft Windows) feature three different modes: a dancing mode which simulates Dance Dance Revolution with the player pushing the button in response to arrows on the screen, a fishing mode in which the player collects pebbles and shrimp as well as air bubbles in order to breathe, and a belly-sledding mode where the player sleds and collects the number of fish needed, sleds to beat a given time or races another character down the hill. In the Nintendo DS version of the game, the rhythm sequences use gameplay mechanics similar to those in Elite Beat Agents, though greatly simplified.

The game also features each of these modes for two players. In the dancing and swimming games, the players compete with each other, while cooperating with each other in the multi-player belly-sledding mode. The game features songs not in the film, such as "Shake Your Booty" from KC and the Sunshine Band when Mumble hatches, and "I Will Survive" from Gloria Gaynor when Mumble drives Gloria away by dancing. These are for the dance modes of the game.

The Game Boy Advance release is significantly different from the console and DS versions; it is primarily a 2D platformer, where Mumble will traverse set levels, usually to perform one task or another for the various characters on the level. Most levels feature a rhythm game, usually playing a song from the film's soundtrack. Other levels are interspaced with smaller minigames, such as sledding or diving for fish, and are required to progress.

== Reception ==
Scores

Aggregate scores
Aggregator	Score
GameRankings	GBA: 58.7% (3 reviews); DS: 51.4% (5 reviews); PS2: 51.1% (7 reviews); Wii: 47.7% (14 reviews); GC: 47.5% (2 reviews); PC: 41.5% (4 reviews)
Metacritic	PS2: 49% (6 reviews); Wii: 46% (11 reviews); PC: 42% (4 reviews)

Review scores
Publication	Score
GameSpot	3.9 out of 10; GBA: 6.1 out of 10; Wii: 3.7 out of 10; DS: 3.5 out of 10
IGN	4.5 out of 10; DS: 5.0 out of 10; GBA: 4.0 out of 10

All versions of Happy Feet received generally mixed-to-negative reviews. The review aggregator Metacritic reports that the PC and PS2 versions of the game received "generally unfavourable" reviews, with the PC receiving a Metascore of 42 out of 100, based on four reviews, whilst the PS2 version received a Metascore of 49 out of 100, based on six reviews. The GameCube, PS2, Wii, and DS versions got similarly mixed reviews, though the Game Boy Advance version of the game got slightly more mixed to positive ratings.
