= Child in the Night =

1990 television film

- Genre: Mystery; Thriller
- Written by: Michael Petryni
- Directed by: Mike Robe
- Starring: JoBeth Williams; Tom Skerritt; Season Hubley; Michael Pniewski; Tim Choate; Thom Bray; John Procaccino; Elijah Wood; Darren McGavin
- Theme music composer: Mark Snow
- Country of origin: United States
- Original language: English

Production
- Executive producer: Mike Robe
- Producer: Ian Martin
- Cinematography: Gerald Hirschfeld
- Editor: Benjamin A. Weissman
- Running time: 98 minutes
- Production companies: Allied Communications; Jayhawk Productions; Mike Robe Productions

Original release
- Network: CBS
- Release: May 1, 1990

Child in the Night is a 1990 American television film broadcast during the 1990 May sweeps. It aired on the CBS Network before a subsequent release to home video and syndication. The psychological thriller stars JoBeth Williams as a child psychologist, Tom Skerritt as a local police chief and introduced Elijah Wood as a troubled witness to a brutal slaying. Darren McGavin co-starred.

It was the final film on-screen role appearance of Rick May, who died nearly 30 years later on April 5, 2020.

== Plot ==
In Seattle, nine-year-old Luke Winfield (Elijah Wood) is the only witness to his father's murder at the hands of a rain-slicker-wearing killer with a cargo hook. However, the boy fantasizes the murderer as Captain Hook, in an escape from the traumatic reality. Detective T. Bass (Tom Skerritt), who is in charge of the investigation enlists child psychologist, Dr. Hollis (JoBeth Williams) whose failed marriage was caused by her inability to have children. While getting closer to Luke she has an affair with Bass. She also discovers some troubling family secrets ensuring she is next to be slain.

== Cast ==
- Elijah Wood as Luke Winfield
- JoBeth Williams as Dr. Hollis
- Tom Skerritt as Bass
- Season Hubley as Valerie Winfield
- Michael Pniewski as Bobby
- Tim Choate as Curt
- Darren McGavin as Os Winfield
- Thom Bray as Harvey
- John Procaccino as Detective Hickman
- Stephen Godwin as Scott Winfield
- Karen Trumbo as Julia Fiori
- John Aylward as Dr. Wendt
- Laura Langwell as Sharon O'Bannon
- Don Hohenstein as Jackie's Date
- J.R. Knotts as Ivan Decker
- Philip Jacquez as Taxi Driver (uncredited)
- Rick May as Captain Hook (uncredited)

== Production ==
JoBeth Williams chose to perform in the film due to the romance subplot between her character and Tom Kerritt's, as she found filming it fun. Child in the Night also marks Elijah Wood's first role.

== Release ==
Child in the Night aired on CBS on May 1, 1990. The film received a VHS release in the 1990s through Triboro and in 2021 was released as part of a box set of made-for-TV movies entitled Televised Terror: Volume One, through Vinegar Syndrome.

== Reception ==
Critical reception was negative and the Honolulu Advertiser wrote "A condemnation of 1980s greed or an overblown two-hour sitcom without the laugh track? You decide." Kay Gardella of the Daily News panned Child in the Night, as she felt that it lacked credibility. A syndicated reviewer for the United Feature Syndicate was similarly dismissive, stating that partway through it "becomes just another whodunit with the standard woman-in-jeopardy climax."

Horror Society reviewed the film as part of the Televised Terror: Volume One box set, stating that it was the weakest of the set but that it was also "a well put together murder mystery."
