= Kevin (Sin City) =

- Sin City character
- Elijah Wood as Kevin in Sin City
- First appearance: The Hard Goodbye
- Created by: Frank Miller
- Portrayed by: Elijah Wood

In-universe information
- Gender: Male
- Residence: Basin City

Kevin is a fictional character in Frank Miller's graphic novel series Sin City, featured prominently in The Hard Goodbye. He is a mute, cannibalistic serial killer who preys on the titular city's prostitutes, The Girls of Old Town. He is protected by the powerful Cardinal Patrick Henry Roark, who also acts as his accomplice. Kevin lives at the Roark family farm, and uses the basement as an execution chamber for his victims; after he kills and eats them, he stuffs and mounts their heads on the walls like hunting trophies.

While he appears harmless and unassuming, Kevin is a fierce, inhumanly fast fighter adept in martial arts; accordingly, the Roark family uses him as an assassin from time to time. He is usually accompanied by his pet wolf, which he feeds whatever parts of his victims he does not eat himself.

In the film adaptation, Kevin is portrayed by Elijah Wood.

== Appearances ==
Kevin "has a blank expression and cropped hair and wears glasses".

=== The Hard Goodbye ===
The Hard Goodbye establishes Kevin's back story, as related by Cardinal Roark. He first meets Roark when going to him for confession, wracked with guilt over the murders he is committing. Roark eventually comes to believe that Kevin is doing God's work by consuming his victims' souls as well as their bodies, and eventually joins him in cannibalistic rituals. Roark also claims that Kevin is mute by choice, and when he speaks it is with "the voice of an angel".

In the main plot, Kevin kills Marv's one true love, Goldie, at Cardinal Roark's behest when she learns the truth about their murder spree; he then frames Marv for the crime. Marv swears revenge, and cuts a bloody swath through the city's underworld until he learns the identity of the killer he seeks. He then follows Kevin to the Farm, where Kevin surprises him and knocks him unconscious. He also kidnaps and imprisons Marv's parole officer, Lucille, and forces her to watch while he eats her hand.

Marv eventually escapes and confronts Kevin again. This time, Marv overpowers him and subjects him to brutal, systematic torture, eventually sawing his limbs off and feeding him to his pet wolf. Much to Marv's frustration, Kevin does not make a sound the entire time, and dies with a blissful smile on his face.

=== That Yellow Bastard ===
Kevin makes a cameo appearance in That Yellow Bastard, set a few years before The Hard Goodbye. He appears at the Farm, sitting in a rocking chair and reading the Bible while Roark Junior tortures Nancy Callahan.

=== Film adaptation ===
Kevin is portrayed by Elijah Wood in Robert Rodriguez's 2005 film adaptation of Sin City.

== Reception ==
To audition Wood for the role, Rodriguez told the actor: "I’m just going to read passages from the comic, from the graphic novel, and you just stare at the camera" recalls the actor, who concludes : "That was my audition". The character had a considerable effect on the public image of the actor, noted Tribute. Frank Miller has stated in the Sin City: Recut and Extended DVD commentary that Kevin and another supporting character, Miho, are the supernatural beings in Sin City; Miller characterizes them as "demons": Miho is a good "demon" and Kevin is an evil one.

Movie Web noted :"Despite the two characters interacting for a significant period within the movie, Mickey Rourke and Elijah Wood never actually met one another until after the project had been filmed. They first became acquainted during the film's premiere, nearly a year after principal photography began."

The same website commented: "what makes Kevin truly frightening is his silence" while Cinemablend judged it was "one of Sin City’s creepiest performances (without saying a word)".

In 2011, UGO Networks ranked Kevin together with Miho as #1 in their list "Quiet as the Grave: The Silent Killers of Film and TV". Miller "has described the characters of Kevin and Miho as the two "supernatural demons" of Sin City, one representing good and one symbolizing evil.", reported Screen Rant. "Few characters have been as mindlessly evil in comic books as Kevin.", wrote Darby Harn in CBR.

The "climactic battle" between Marv and Kevin has been noted by various commentators as one of the key moments in the books and films of the series as well as the final torture scene, David Edelstein writing: "The final encounter between this blockish pugilistic slab of beef and Elijah Wood’s Kevin—a mute cannibal psycho geek with little glasses that white out his eyes and who fights like a weightless dervish—is a thrilling gravitational mismatch."

Vulture wrote: "Anyone who's read Sin City can tell you who the creepiest character of them all is: the nimble, silent, perpetually smiling cannibal known only as Kevin. He was played with expert menace by Elijah Wood in the first Sin City movie, but it's hard to top the way Miller depicted him on the page. In [a] three-part panel, he has more command of his body than any other character (except, perhaps, Miho), and never looks like he's breaking a sweat while he genially demolishes even the mountainlike Marv. That smile ... that smile!"

Freddy Quezada wrote of the character: "he will always maintain the smile that eating his victims put on his face and that he uses in front of Marv, surpassing the vigilante, when he cuts him into pieces. Indifferent to pleasure and pain, serene in his crimes as in his punishment, unalterable in the excess of desire as in the lack of it, impressing me and being a jewel that no philosopher of the likes of Umberto Eco or Fernando Savater, both comic book fans, had ever seen, and I will finish by saying that between Buddha and Sade, then, there will always be Kevin."
