= Elijah Wood =

American actor and producer (born 1981)

- Wood in 2026
- Born: Elijah Jordan Wood; January 28, 1981 (age 45); Cedar Rapids, Iowa, U.S.
- Occupations: Actor; film producer
- Years active: 1989–present
- Works: Full list
- Spouse: Mette-Marie Kongsved (m. 2024)
- Children: 2
- Awards: Full list

Elijah Jordan Wood (born January 28, 1981) is an American actor and producer. A prominent child actor of the 1990s and a prolific figure in major studio features during the 2000s, he has received various accolades including two Saturn Awards, an Actor Award, a Critics' Choice Award and an Empire Award in addition to a nomination for a Daytime Emmy Award.

Wood made his film debut with a minor part in Back to the Future Part II (1989) at age eight and gained recognition in the early 1990s as a child actor with roles such as Avalon (1990), Forever Young (1992), The Adventures of Huck Finn (1993), and The Good Son (1993). As a teenager, he starred in the films North (1994), The War (1994), Flipper (1996), The Ice Storm (1997), Deep Impact (1998), and The Faculty (1998). Wood achieved international recognition in the early 2000s for playing Frodo Baggins in The Lord of the Rings film trilogy (2001–2003), based on the classic fantasy novel of the same name by J. R. R. Tolkien.

As an adult, Wood has appeared in a wide range of films, including Eternal Sunshine of the Spotless Mind (2004), Sin City (2005), and I Don't Feel at Home in This World Anymore (2017). He has had voice roles in projects such as Happy Feet (2006), The Legend of Spyro (2006–2008), 9 (2009), Tron: Uprising (2012–2013), and Over the Garden Wall (2014). On television, Wood starred in the series Wilfred (2011–2014), Dirk Gently's Holistic Detective Agency (2016–2017), and Yellowjackets (2023–2025).

Wood founded the record label Simian Records in 2005, which was dissolved in 2015. He directed the 2007 music video "Energy" for The Apples in Stereo. In 2010, Wood co-founded a film production company for horror films, The Woodshed, renamed SpectreVision in 2014. Wood is a disc jockey, and has toured globally with his friend Zach Cowie as the duo Wooden Wisdom.

== Early life ==
Elijah Jordan Wood was born on January 28, 1981, in Cedar Rapids, Iowa, to Debbie (née Krause) and Warren Wood, who operated a delicatessen together. He is of English, Danish, Irish, and German ancestry, and was raised Catholic. He has an older brother named Zachariah and a younger sister named Hannah. At age seven, Wood began modeling and taking piano lessons in his hometown. In elementary school, he appeared in The Sound of Music and played the title character in The Wonderful Wizard of Oz. He served as a choirboy in a production of See How They Run. Wood's parents sold their delicatessen in 1989 and the family, without his father, moved to Los Angeles to allow him to pursue an acting career while attending Laurel Springs School, an accredited distance education high school, to gain flexibility to pursue his career; they divorced when he was fifteen.

== Career ==
=== 1989–2000: Early work ===
Wood modeled and appeared in local commercials; his first appearance was in the music video for Paula Abdul's "Forever Your Girl", directed by David Fincher. This was followed by a pivotal role in the made-for-TV film, Child in the Night, and a minor role in Back to the Future Part II, as a boy from a futuristic 2015 who teases Marty McFly (Michael J. Fox) for playing an arcade game because "you have to use your hands". Nine-year-old Wood auditioned for a role in Kindergarten Cop, but was told by director Ivan Reitman that his performance was not believable, which Wood later said was "a harsh thing to say to a nine-year-old."

Playing Aidan Quinn's son in Avalon garnered professional attention for Wood; the film received widespread critical acclaim and was nominated for four Academy Awards. A small part in Richard Gere's Internal Affairs was followed by the role of a boy who brings estranged couple Melanie Griffith and Don Johnson back together in Paradise (1991). In 1992, Wood co-starred with Mel Gibson and Jamie Lee Curtis in Forever Young, and with Joseph Mazzello in Radio Flyer.

In 1993, Wood played the title character in Disney's adaptation of Mark Twain's novel, The Adventures of Huck Finn, and co-starred with Macaulay Culkin in the psychological thriller The Good Son. The following year, he starred in The War, alongside Kevin Costner. Although the film received mostly negative reviews, Wood's performance earned praise. Roger Ebert's review of the film praised Wood highly, stating that Wood "has emerged, I believe, as the most talented actor, in his age group, in Hollywood history."

Wood's title role—opposite Bruce Willis—in the Robert Reiner film North (1994) was followed by a Super Bowl commercial for Lay's "Wavy" potato chips (with Dan Quayle). In 1995, Wood appeared in the music video for The Cranberries' "Ridiculous Thoughts", played the lead role in Flipper, and co-starred in Ang Lee's critically acclaimed The Ice Storm. In 1996, he guest starred in the episode entitled "The True Test" in Homicide: Life on the Street. In 1997, Wood played Jack "The Artful Dodger" Dawkins in a made-for-TV adaptation of Oliver Twist, alongside Richard Dreyfuss. The following year, he had a leading role in the sci-fi disaster film Deep Impact, and a starring role in The Faculty, directed by Robert Rodriguez. In 1999, Wood played a suburban white teenager who affects hip-hop lingo in James Toback's Black and White, and a junior hitman in Chain of Fools.

=== 2001–2003: The Lord of the Rings ===
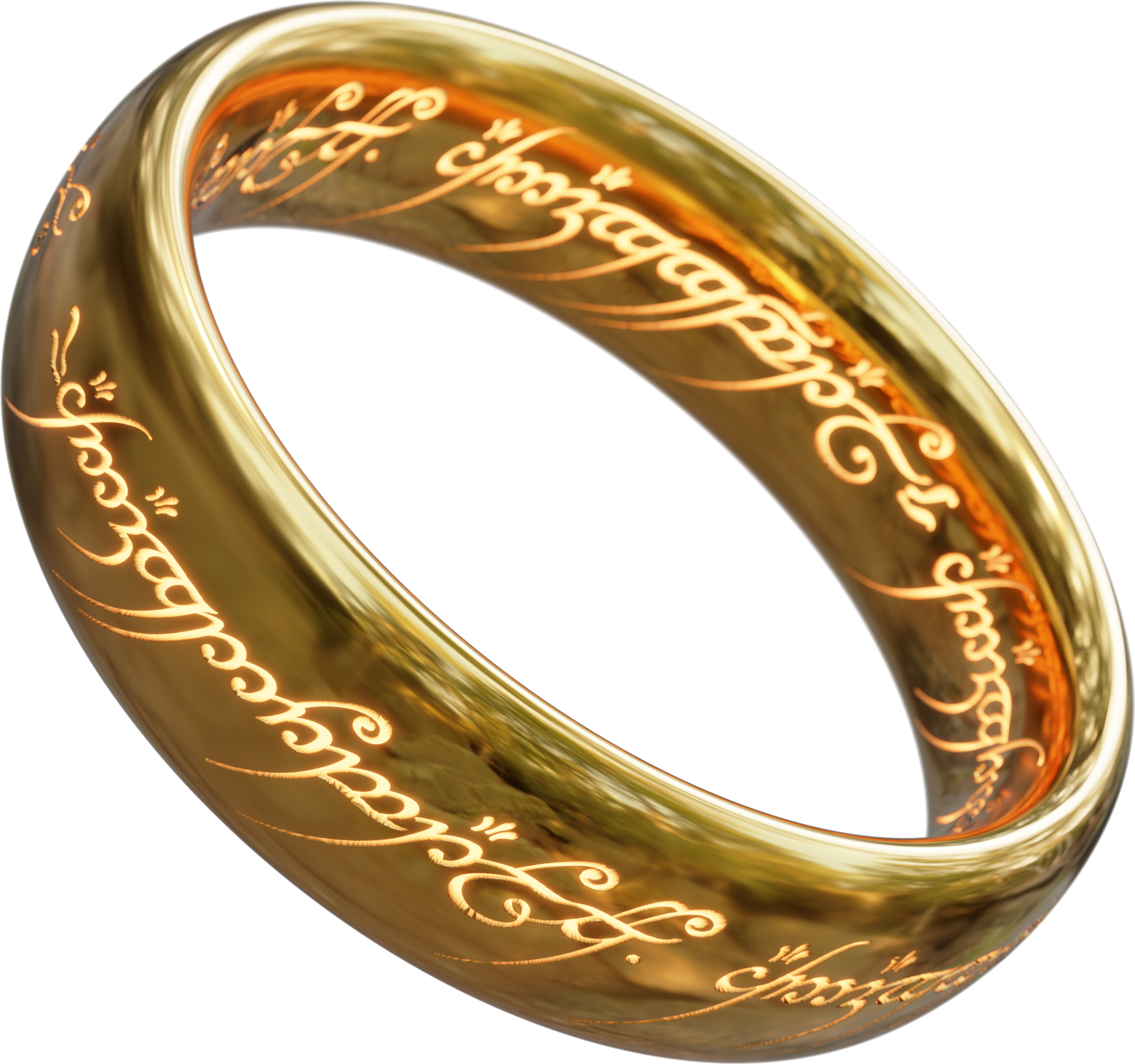
After the lengthy filming of Lord of the Rings, Jackson gave Wood one of the One Ring props (artist's impression shown) used on the set.

Wood played Frodo Baggins in the 2001 The Lord of the Rings: The Fellowship of the Ring, the first installment of Peter Jackson's adaptation of J. R. R. Tolkien's multi-volume novel. Wood was a fan of the Hobbit, and he sent in an audition tape of himself dressed as Frodo, reading lines from the novel. He was selected from 150 actors who auditioned. Wood was the first actor to be cast. This gave Wood top billing, alongside a cast full of stars.

The Lord of the Rings trilogy was filmed in New Zealand; principal photography took over a year, and pick-up shooting continued annually for the next four years. Before the cast left the country, Jackson gave Wood two gifts: one of the One Ring props used on the set and Sting, Frodo's sword. He was also given a pair of prosthetic "hobbit feet" of the type worn during filming.

In 2002, Wood lent his voice to the DTV release of The Adventures of Tom Thumb and Thumbelina. Later that year, the second part of Peter Jackson's trilogy was released, titled The Lord of the Rings: The Two Towers. In 2003, Wood starred in the DTV film All I Want and cameoed as 'The Guy' in Spy Kids 3-D: Game Over. The concluding chapter of the Rings trilogy, The Lord of the Rings: The Return of the King was released in December of that year.

=== 2004–2010: Post Lord of the Rings ===
Wood's first role following his Lord of the Rings success was in Eternal Sunshine of the Spotless Mind (2004), in which he played Patrick, an unscrupulous lab technician who pursues Kate Winslet. The film received the Academy Award for Best Original Screenplay in 2005. He next played the silent serial killer Kevin in Robert Rodriguez's adaptation of Frank Miller's comic book series, Sin City (2005). Wood's audition for the role only consisted of staring at a film camera while passages from the graphic novel were read. On May 12, 2005, Wood hosted MTV Presents: The Next Generation Xbox Revealed for the launch of the Xbox 360 video game console.

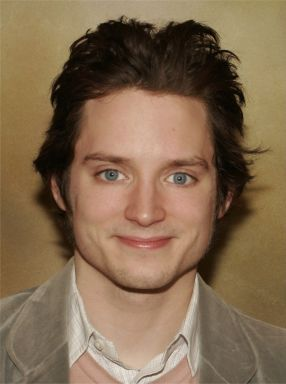
Wood in February 2006

In Everything Is Illuminated (2005), Wood starred as a young Jewish-American man on a quest to find the woman who saved his grandfather during World War II. It was based on the novel of the same name by Jonathan Safran Foer. In Green Street (also 2005), he played an American college student who joins a violent British football firm. Both had limited release but were critically acclaimed.

Wood shot a small part in Paris, je t'aime (2006), which consists of 18 five-minute sections, each directed by a different director. Wood's section, called "Quartier de la Madeleine", was directed by Vincenzo Natali. The film played at the Cannes Film Festival and the Toronto International Film Festival. In George Miller's animated musical Happy Feet (2006), Wood provided the voice of Mumble, a penguin who can tap dance, but not sing. Happy Feet grossed over $380 million worldwide, and received both the Academy Award for Best Animated Feature and the BAFTA Award for Best Animated Film. Wood reprised his role for the film's sequel, Happy Feet Two (2011).

Also in 2006, he was part of the ensemble cast of Emilio Estevez's drama Bobby, a fictionalized account of the hours leading up to the June 5, 1968, shooting of U.S. Senator Robert F. Kennedy. In the film, Wood marries Lindsay Lohan's character in order to avoid being drafted for the Vietnam War. Bobby screened in competition at the Venice Film Festival. Wood, along with his co-stars, received a nomination for the Screen Actors Guild Award for Outstanding Performance by a Cast in a Motion Picture. Later that year, Wood hosted the television special Saving a Species: The Great Penguin Rescue for Discovery Kids; he received a nomination for the Daytime Emmy Award for Outstanding Performer in Children's Programming. That same year, it was announced that Wood was set to star in The Passenger, a biographical film about singer Iggy Pop. However, the project failed to come to fruition after years in development.

Wood has provided voiceovers for video games, including the voice of Spyro the Dragon in The Legend of Spyro game trilogy (2006–2008), as well as reprising Mumble in the game version of Happy Feet (2006–2011). On January 4, 2007, Wood joined Screen Actors Guild president Alan Rosenberg in a live telecast to announce the nominees for the 13th Annual Screen Actors Guild Awards. Later that year, he starred in Day Zero, a drama about conscription in the United States, which had its debut at the Tribeca Film Festival. In The Oxford Murders (2008), a film adaptation of the novel of the same name by Guillermo Martínez, Wood played a graduate student who investigates a series of bizarre, mathematically based murders in Oxford. The following year, he voiced the lead in the animated feature film 9, which was produced by Tim Burton.

=== 2011–present: Wilfred and further work ===
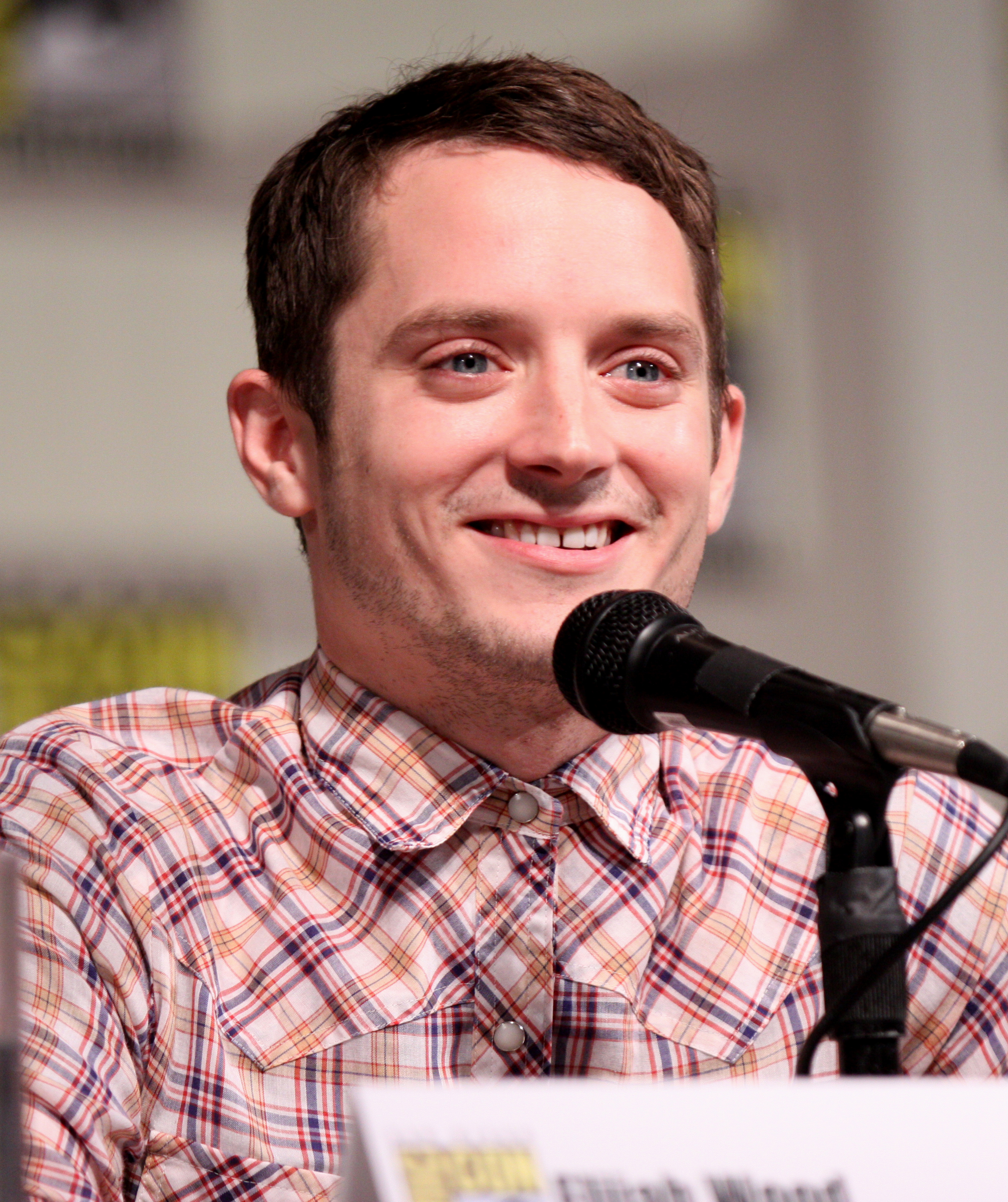
At the 2011 San Diego Comic-Con

Wood's first starring television role came in the FX series, Wilfred, where he played Ryan Newman, who is described as "an introverted and troubled young man struggling unsuccessfully to make his way in the world until he forms a unique friendship with Wilfred, his neighbor's canine pet." The pilot episode was shot in the summer of 2010, and the series lasted four seasons, with the final episode airing in the U.S. on August 13, 2014. For his role, Wood received a nomination for the Satellite Award for Best Actor – Television Series Musical or Comedy in 2011.

In January 2011, it was confirmed that Wood had signed on to reprise the role of Frodo Baggins in The Hobbit: An Unexpected Journey, the first film of the Hobbit trilogy, directed again by Peter Jackson. The film was released the following year and grossed over $1 billion at the worldwide box office.

Wood featured in the Beastie Boys' 2011 music video for "Make Some Noise," along with Seth Rogen and Danny McBride. He then starred in the Flying Lotus music video "Tiny Tortures," where he played a recent amputee coming to grips with his new situation. The psychedelic video was described as "menacing and magical."

In 2012, Wood had a supporting role in the romantic comedy Celeste and Jesse Forever, and starred in the horror film Maniac, for which he received the Fangoria Chainsaw Award for Best Actor. Maniac was mostly shot from a first person point of view of Wood's character. Wood played the leading role in the 2013 Hitchcockian suspense thriller Grand Piano. He voiced Shay, one of two main characters in the adventure game Broken Age, for which he received the 2014 Performance in a Comedy, Lead award from National Academy of Video Game Trade Reviewers (NAVGTR).

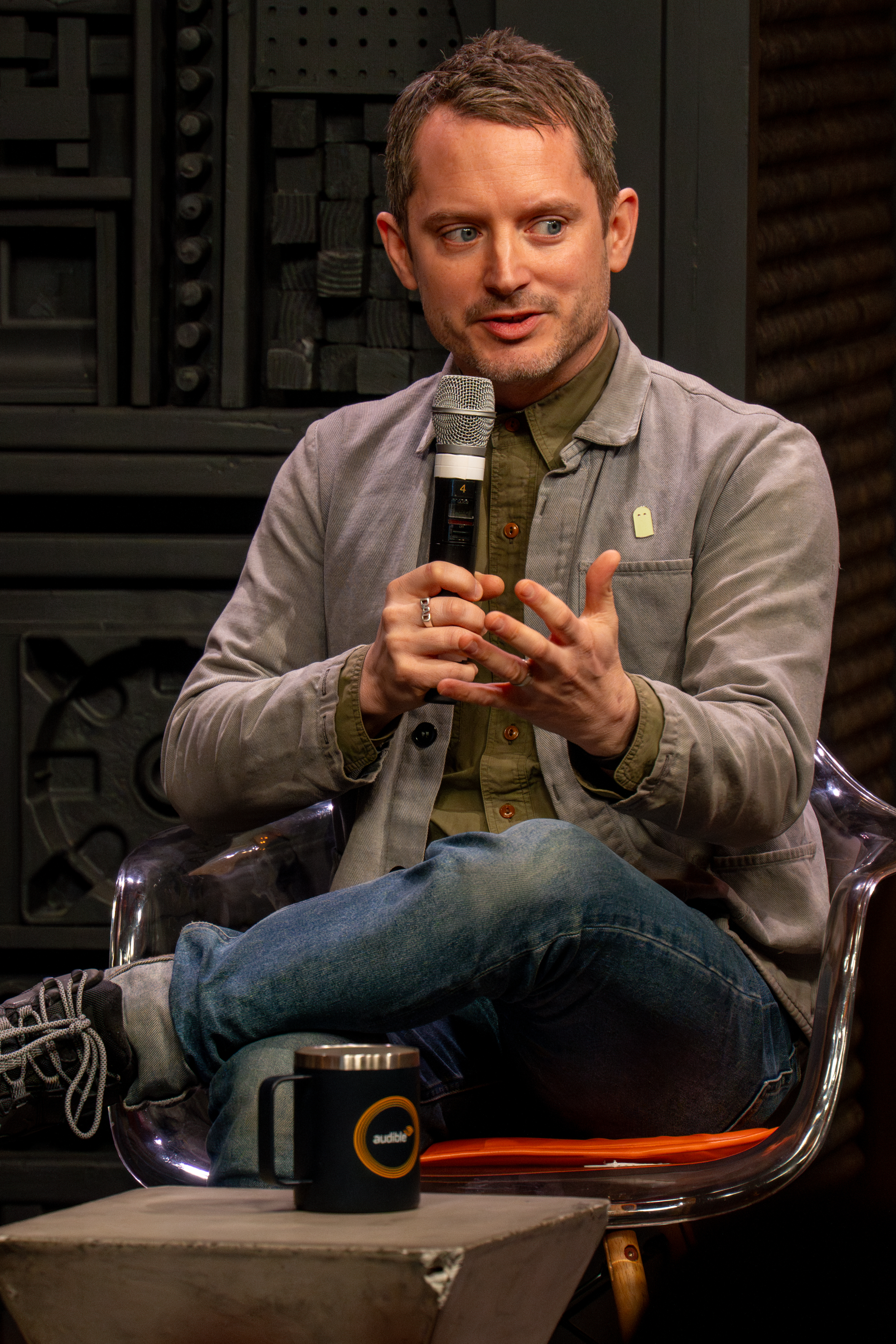
Wood at the 2025 Sundance Film Festival

Wood provided the voice of main character Wirt in Cartoon Network's animated miniseries Over the Garden Wall. The series collected three Primetime Emmy Awards in 2015, including Outstanding Animated Program. This was followed by prominent roles in films The Last Witch Hunter (2015), opposite Vin Diesel; The Trust (2016), opposite Nicolas Cage; and I Don't Feel at Home in This World Anymore (2017), opposite Melanie Lynskey. The latter film was awarded the U.S. Dramatic Grand Jury Prize at Sundance in January 2017.

From 2016 to 2017, Wood co-starred with Samuel Barnett as Todd Brotzman in the BBC America series Dirk Gently's Holistic Detective Agency. It was announced in December 2017 that the show had not been renewed for a third season. Wood provided the voice of Nick Johnsmith / Gristol Malik in Psychonauts 2.

In 2019, Wood starred as the musician Norval Greenwood in Ant Timpson's black comedy thriller Come to Daddy. He both starred as Special Agent Bill Hagmaier and helped to produce Amber Sealey's 2021 crime mystery No Man of God, based on the real life story of Hagmaier's relationship with serial killer Ted Bundy. In 2023, Wood played the starring role of Fritz Garbinger in Macon Blair's superhero comedy horror movie The Toxic Avenger, one of a series. In 2025, Wood voiced the adult voice of Wilbur in Charlotte's Web.

== Other activities ==
Wood appeared in The Cranberries' music video for "Ridiculous Thoughts" and in Danko Jones' three-piece series: "Full of Regret," "Had Enough," and "I Think Bad Thoughts." He also appeared in the Beastie Boys music video "Make Some Noise."

On April 11, 2008, Wood was the guest host of Channel 4's Friday Night Project. On April 25, 2009, he was honored with the Midnight Award by the San Francisco International Film Festival as an American actor who "has made outstanding contributions to independent and Hollywood cinema, and who brings striking intelligence, exemplary talent and extraordinary depth of character to his roles."

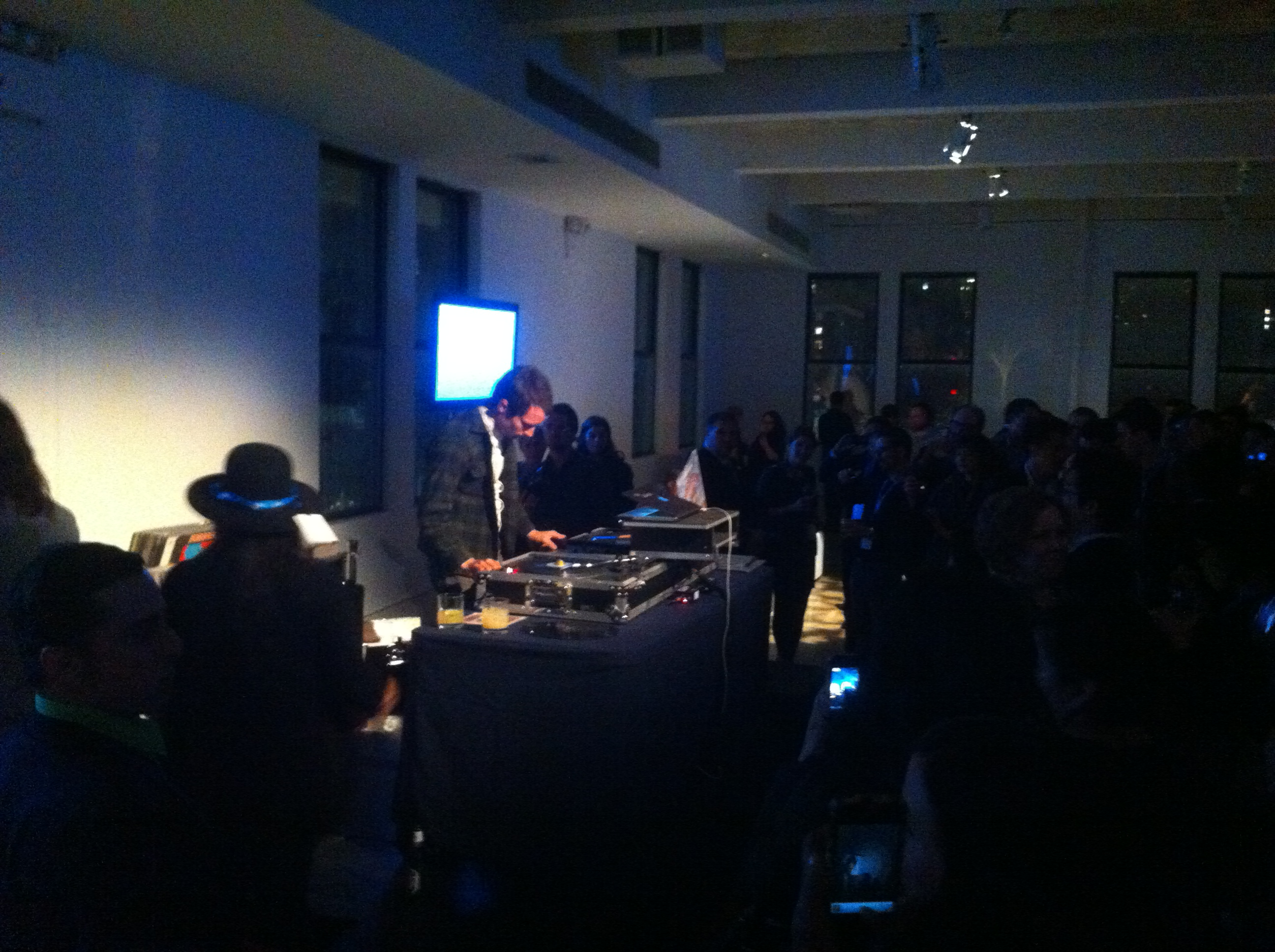
Wood DJing at the box.com launch party in 2012

Wood has become a well-known disc jockey. Together with his friend Zach Cowie, they formed Wooden Wisdom and have toured around the world. They have spun at events such as the Bushmills Live 2012 festival at the Old Bushmills Distillery, the opening of the Brickell City Centre and at the pre-Emmy party at The London West Hollywood hotel.

Wood signed up to co-produce and star in the film Black Wings Has My Angel, based on the noir novel of the same name, with Anthony Moody and Rob Malkani of Indalo Productions. Wood, alongside Tom Hiddleston and Anna Paquin, was set start shooting in late 2012, but the production of the movie was delayed.

Wood together with Sean Astin, Sean Bean, Orlando Bloom, Billy Boyd, Ian McKellen, Dominic Monaghan, Viggo Mortensen, Miranda Otto, John Rhys-Davies, Andy Serkis, Liv Tyler, and Karl Urban, plus writer Philippa Boyens and director Peter Jackson on May 31, 2020, joined Josh Gad's YouTube series Reunited Apart which reunites the cast of popular movies through video-conferencing, and promotes donations to non-profit charities.

== Business ventures ==
In 2005, Wood started his own record label called Simian Records. On September 19, 2006, Wood announced that Simian had signed The Apples in Stereo as their first band, with their new album New Magnetic Wonder released in February 2007. In addition, he also directed the band's 2007 music video for "Energy."

In 2010, Wood, together with Daniel Noah and Josh C. Waller, founded The Woodshed, a production company that promotes horror films. In 2013, the company was re-branded as SpectreVision.

== Personal life ==
Wood began dating Danish film producer Mette-Marie Kongsved in 2018 after meeting a year earlier. They married on New Year's Eve in 2024. They have two children together, a son (b. 2019) and a daughter (b. 2022). He moved to Los Angeles around 2020 after living in Austin, Texas for five years.

Wood has a tattoo of the Elvish Sindarin word "nine", written in Tolkien's constructed script of Tengwar, below his waist on the right side. It refers to his character as one of the nine members of the Fellowship of the Ring.

In May 2006, Wood was ranked at No. 7 on Autograph Collector Magazine's list of the "10 Best Hollywood Autograph Signers".

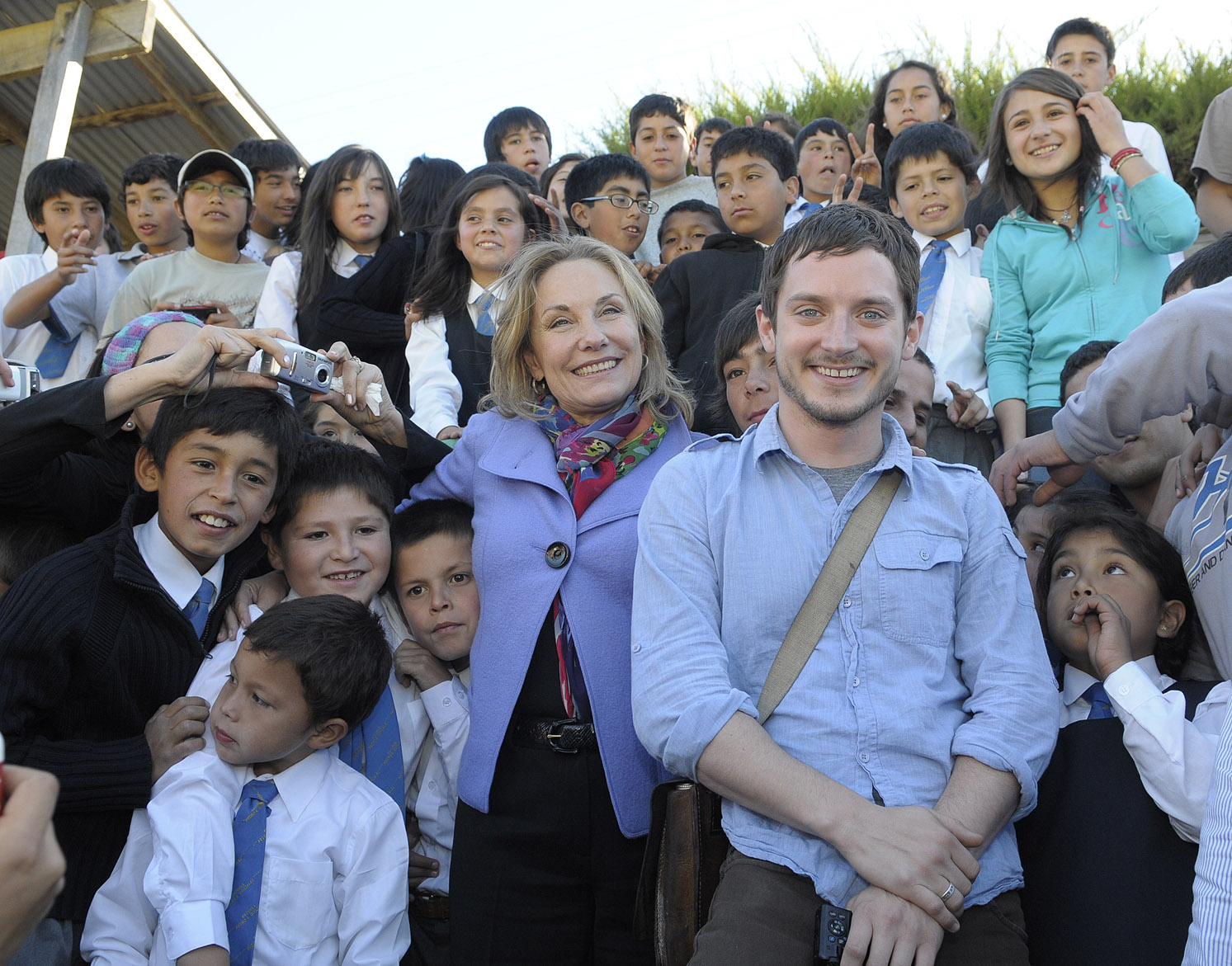
Wood during his 2010 visit to Chile, with First Lady Cecilia Morel

On April 23, 2010, in a charitable gesture, Wood visited the Chilean town of Curepto, one of the hardest hit by the 8.8 magnitude earthquake that struck on February 27, 2010. He made personal visits to many of the victims and was accompanied by the first lady of Chile, Cecilia Morel.

Wood participated in the 2011 Occupy Wall Street movement. He was an active supporter of Bernie Sanders during the 2016 presidential election.

During a 2016 interview with The Sunday Times, Wood accused Hollywood of being organized by pedophiles who preyed on children within the industry, including many of his fellow child actors. Wood credited his mother with protecting him from these "vipers" and parties "where that kind of thing was going on". After the interview made international headlines, Wood clarified that he had "no firsthand experience or observation of the topic" and that his comments had been partly based on the documentary An Open Secret that he had seen.

== Filmography and awards ==
Preceded by Jess Harnell	Voice of Spyro the Dragon; 2006–2008	Succeeded by Josh Keaton
