= Sin City (film) =

2005 American crime thriller film

- Theatrical release poster
- Directed by: Robert Rodriguez; Frank Miller
- Based on: Sin City by Frank Miller
- Produced by: Elizabeth Avellán; Robert Rodriguez
- Starring: Jessica Alba; Benicio del Toro; Brittany Murphy; Clive Owen; Mickey Rourke; Bruce Willis; Elijah Wood
- Cinematography: Robert Rodriguez
- Edited by: Robert Rodriguez
- Music by: John Debney; Graeme Revell; Robert Rodriguez
- Production companies: Dimension Films; Troublemaker Studios
- Distributed by: Miramax Films
- Release dates: March 28, 2005 (Mann National Theater); April 1, 2005 (United States)
- Running time: 124 minutes
- Country: United States
- Language: English
- Budget: $40 million
- Box office: $158.7 million

Sin City (also known as Frank Miller's Sin City) is a 2005 American neo-noir crime anthology film directed by Robert Rodriguez and Frank Miller based on Miller's comic book series of the same name. The film stars an ensemble cast led by Jessica Alba, Benicio del Toro, Brittany Murphy, Clive Owen, Mickey Rourke, Bruce Willis, Michael Clarke Duncan and Elijah Wood, and featuring Alexis Bledel, Powers Boothe, Rosario Dawson, Devon Aoki, Carla Gugino, Josh Hartnett, Rutger Hauer, Jaime King, Michael Madsen, Nick Stahl, and Makenzie Vega among others.

Much of the film is based on the first, third, and fourth books in Miller's original comic series. The Hard Goodbye is about an ex-convict who embarks on a rampage in search of his one-time sweetheart's killer. The Big Fat Kill follows a private investigator who gets caught in a street war between a group of prostitutes and a group of mercenaries, the police, and the mob. That Yellow Bastard focuses on an aging police officer who protects a young woman from a grotesquely disfigured serial killer. The intro and outro of the film are based on the short story "The Customer is Always Right", which is collected in Booze, Broads & Bullets, the sixth book in the comic series.

Sin City premiered at the Mann National Theater on March 28, 2005 and was released by Miramax Films on April 1, 2005. The film was a critical and commercial success, gathering particular recognition for its unique color processing, which rendered most of the film in black and white while retaining or adding color for selected objects, and grossing $158.7 million against a $40 million budget. The film was screened at the 2005 Cannes Film Festival in competition and won the Technical Grand Prize for the film's "visual shaping". A sequel also directed by Miller and Rodriguez was released in 2014, Sin City: A Dame to Kill For, but failed to match the success of its predecessor.

== Plot ==
=== "The Customer Is Always Right (Part I)" ===
The Salesman walks onto a penthouse balcony where The Customer looks out over Basin City. He offers her a cigarette and says that she looks like someone who is tired of running and that he will save her. The two share a kiss, and he shoots her; she dies in his arms. He says he will never know what she was running from but that he will cash her check in the morning.

=== "That Yellow Bastard (Part I)" ===
On the docks of Sin City, aging police officer John Hartigan tries to stop serial child-killer Roark Junior from raping and killing his fourth known victim, eleven-year-old Nancy Callahan. Junior is the son of the corrupt and powerful Senator Roark, who has bribed Hartigan's corrupt partner, Bob, to cover up his son's crimes. Bob tries to persuade Hartigan to walk away; Hartigan knocks him out.

Hartigan, fighting pain from a bad heart, heads into the warehouse where Roark Junior is holding Nancy. After defeating his accomplices, Hartigan confronts Junior and shoots off his ear, hand, and genitals. Bob, now recovered, arrives and shoots Hartigan in the back. As the sirens approach, Bob leaves, and Nancy lies down in Hartigan's lap. Hartigan passes out, reasoning his death is a fair trade for the girl's life.

=== "The Hard Goodbye" ===
After a one-night stand with a woman named Goldie, Marv awakens to find she has been killed while he slept. He flees the frame-up as the police arrive, vowing to avenge her death. His parole officer, Lucille, advises him to give up, for Marv may have imagined it all due to his "condition". Marv interrogates several informants, working up to a corrupt priest, who reveals that the Roark family was behind the murder. Marv kills the priest. As he leaves, Marv is attacked by a woman who looks like Goldie, which he dismisses as a hallucination.

Marv goes to the Roark family farm and is subdued by the silent stalker who killed Goldie. He awakens in the basement to find Lucille has been captured after looking into his story. She tells Marv that the killer is a cannibal named Kevin and that Goldie was a prostitute. They escape the basement, but Lucille is shot by a squad of corrupt cops. Marv kills the cops except for their leader, who reveals Cardinal Patrick Henry Roark arranged for Goldie's murder.

Marv goes to Old Town, Sin City's prostitute-run red-light district, to learn more about Goldie and is captured by her twin sister, Wendy. Once he convinces Wendy that he is not the killer, the two return to the farm where Marv traps and kills Kevin. He confronts Cardinal Roark, who confesses his part in the murders. Kevin was the cardinal's ward; the two men ate the prostitutes to "consume their souls". Marv kills the cardinal. He is then shot and captured by his guards.

Marv is nursed back to health. Corrupt cops threaten to kill his blind mother to get him to confess to killing Roark, Kevin, and their victims. He is sentenced to death in the electric chair. Wendy visits him on death row and thanks him for avenging her sister. Marv is then executed.

=== "The Big Fat Kill" ===
Shellie is being harassed by her abusive ex-boyfriend Jackie Boy. Her boyfriend Dwight McCarthy violently warns him to leave Shellie alone. Jackie Boy and his cronies drunkenly drive to Old Town. Dwight follows and sees them harass Becky, a young prostitute. Gail, the prostitutes' leader and Dwight's on-and-off lover, also witnesses the scene. When Jackie Boy threatens Becky with a gun, Miho, a martial arts expert, kills Jackie Boy and his friends. They realize Jackie Boy is actually Detective Lieutenant Jack Rafferty of the Basin City Police, considered a "hero cop" by the press. If the cops learn how he died, their truce with the prostitutes would end, and the mob would be free to wage war on Old Town.

Dwight takes the bodies to a tar pit, where he is ambushed by an ex-IRA mercenary hired by mob boss Wallenquist. He nearly drowns in the tar before Miho saves him. The mercenary flees to the sewer with Jackie Boy's severed head but Dwight and Miho retrieve it and return to Old Town. Meanwhile, mob enforcer Manute kidnaps Gail. Becky, threatened with the death of her mother, betrays the prostitutes. Manute prepares the mob's invasion of Old Town. Dwight trades Jackie Boy's head for Gail's freedom, but the head is stuffed with explosives; Dwight detonates it, destroying the evidence and Gail's captors. The other prostitutes gun down the mercenaries while Becky, injured in the fight, escapes.

=== "That Yellow Bastard (Part II)" ===
Hartigan is recovering in a hospital when Senator Roark informs him that Junior is in a coma and the Roark legacy is in serious jeopardy. Hartigan will be framed for Junior's crimes; if he tells anyone the truth, his family will die. A grateful Nancy promises to write to him every week. Hartigan goes to jail, though he refuses to confess. He receives weekly letters from Nancy, as promised. After eight years, the letters stop, and he receives a severed finger instead. Hartigan confesses to all charges, leading to his parole. He searches for an adult Nancy, not knowing he is being followed by a deformed, yellow man. He eventually finds her at Kadie's Bar, where she has become an exotic dancer.

Hartigan realizes he was set up to lead "them" to Nancy, and the two drive away in her car, followed by the deformed man. As they hide in a motel, Nancy confesses her love for Hartigan, who is unable to reciprocate her feelings. The deformed man ambushes Hartigan and reveals himself as Roark Junior, disfigured by years of treatment to regenerate his body parts. Junior hangs Hartigan and takes Nancy away. Hartigan escapes and tracks down Junior to the Roark farm. He fakes a heart attack, causing Junior to lower his guard. He castrates Junior a second time and brutally beats him to death. He sends Nancy away in her car, promising to join her soon. Knowing that Senator Roark will never stop hunting them, Hartigan commits suicide to ensure Nancy's safety.

=== "The Customer Is Always Right (Part II)" ===
An injured Becky departs from a hospital, talking on a cell phone with her mother. In the elevator, she encounters The Salesman, dressed as a doctor. He offers her a cigarette, calling her by name, and she abruptly ends the call with her mother.

== Cast ==
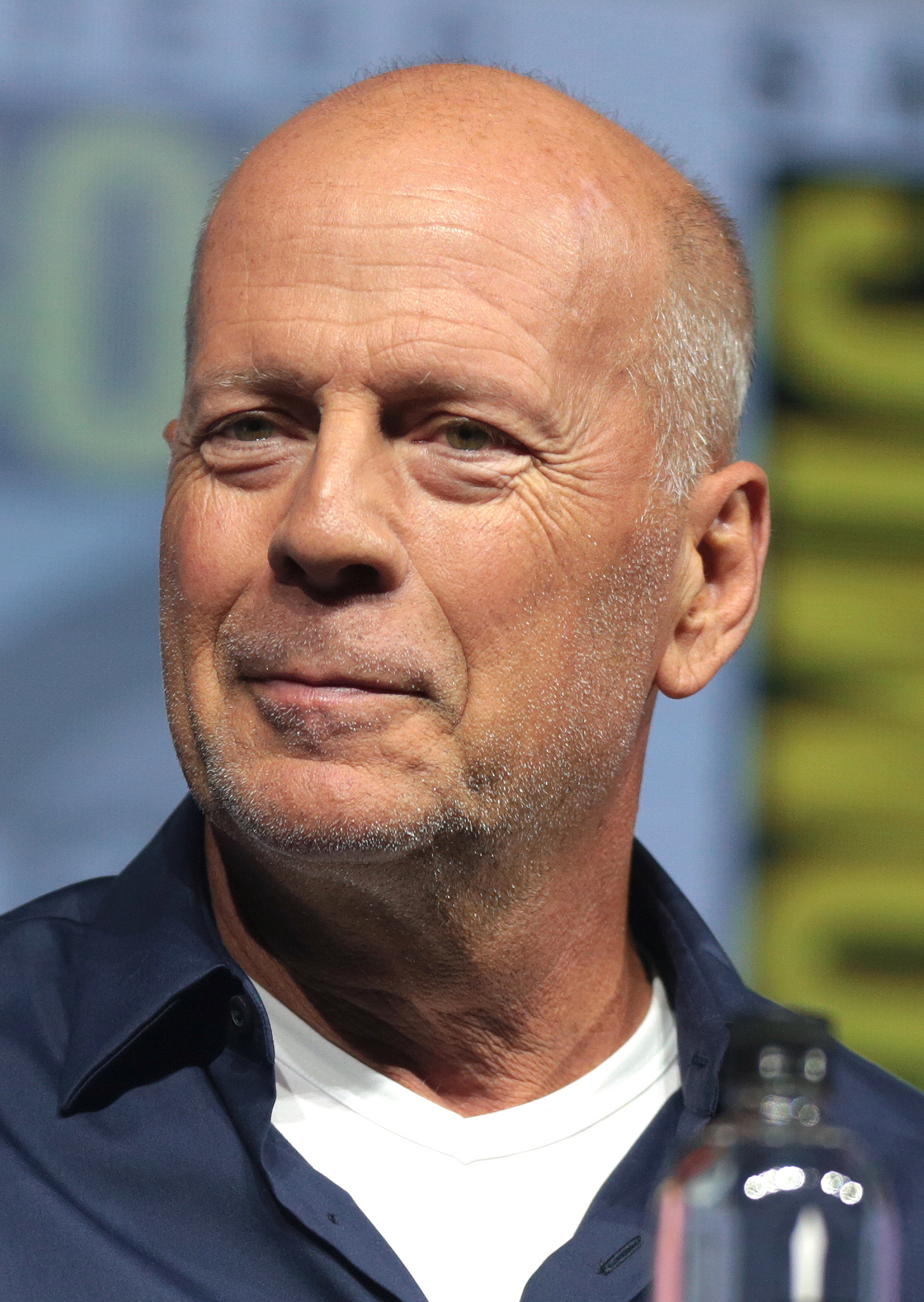
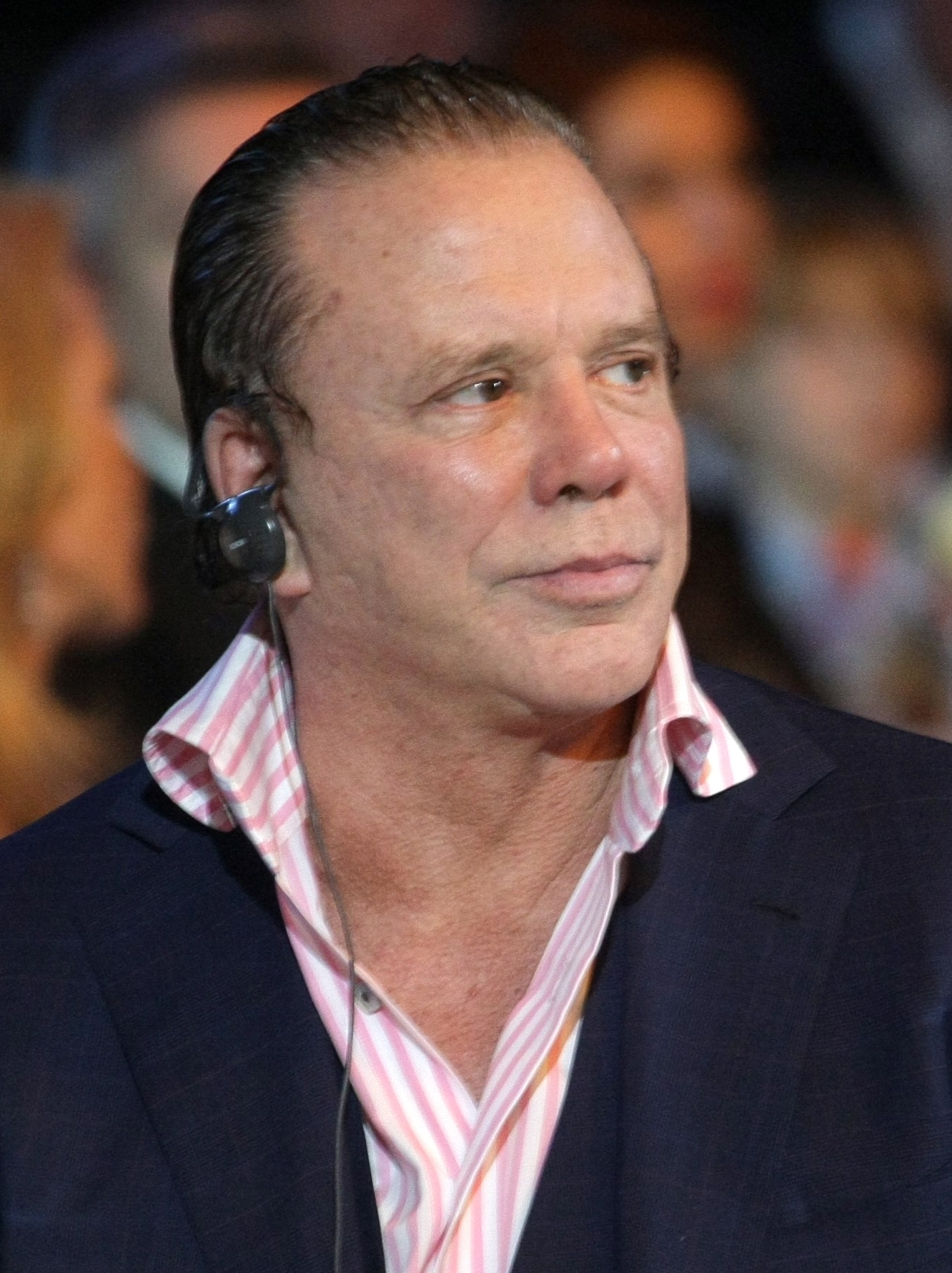
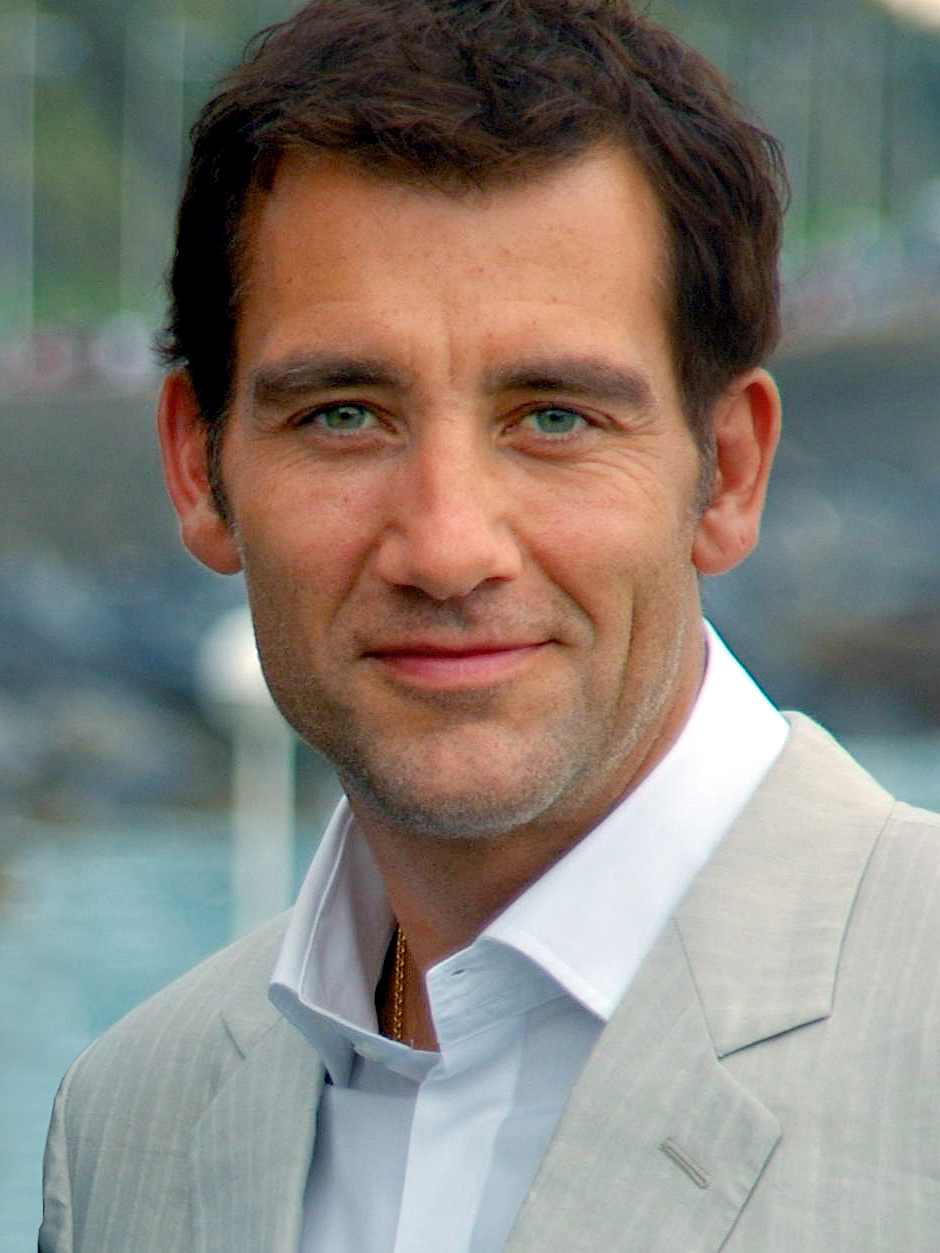
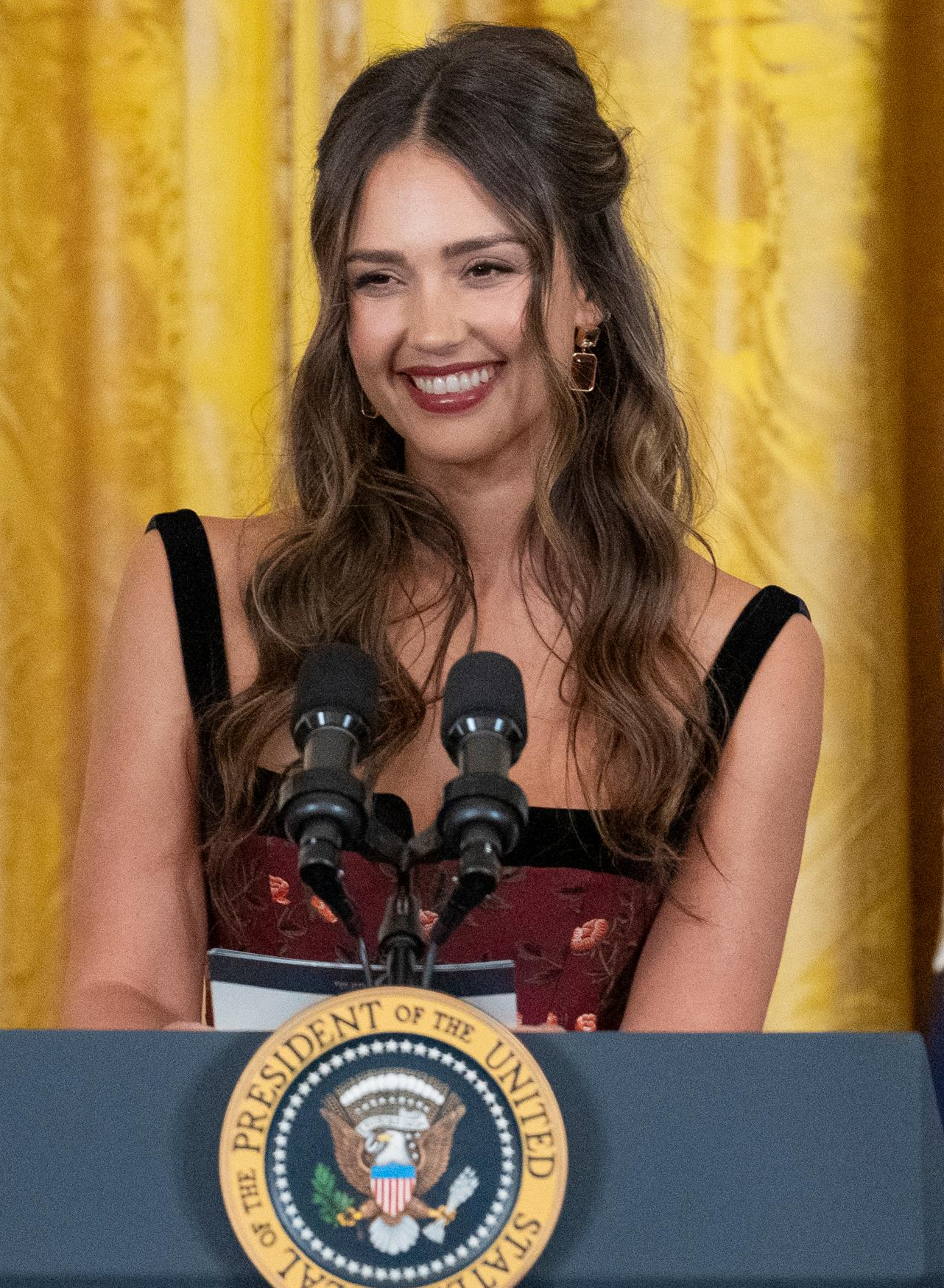
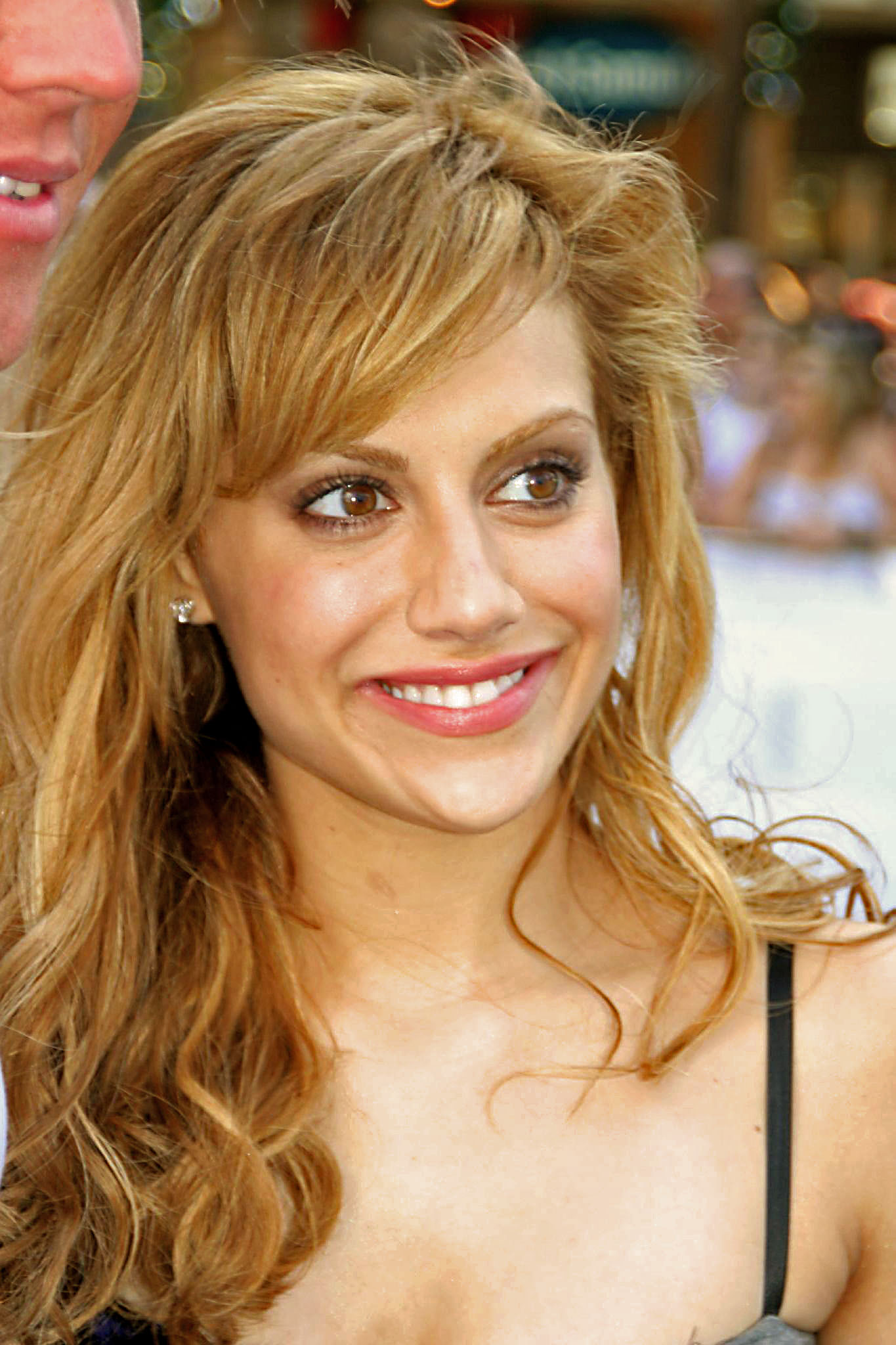
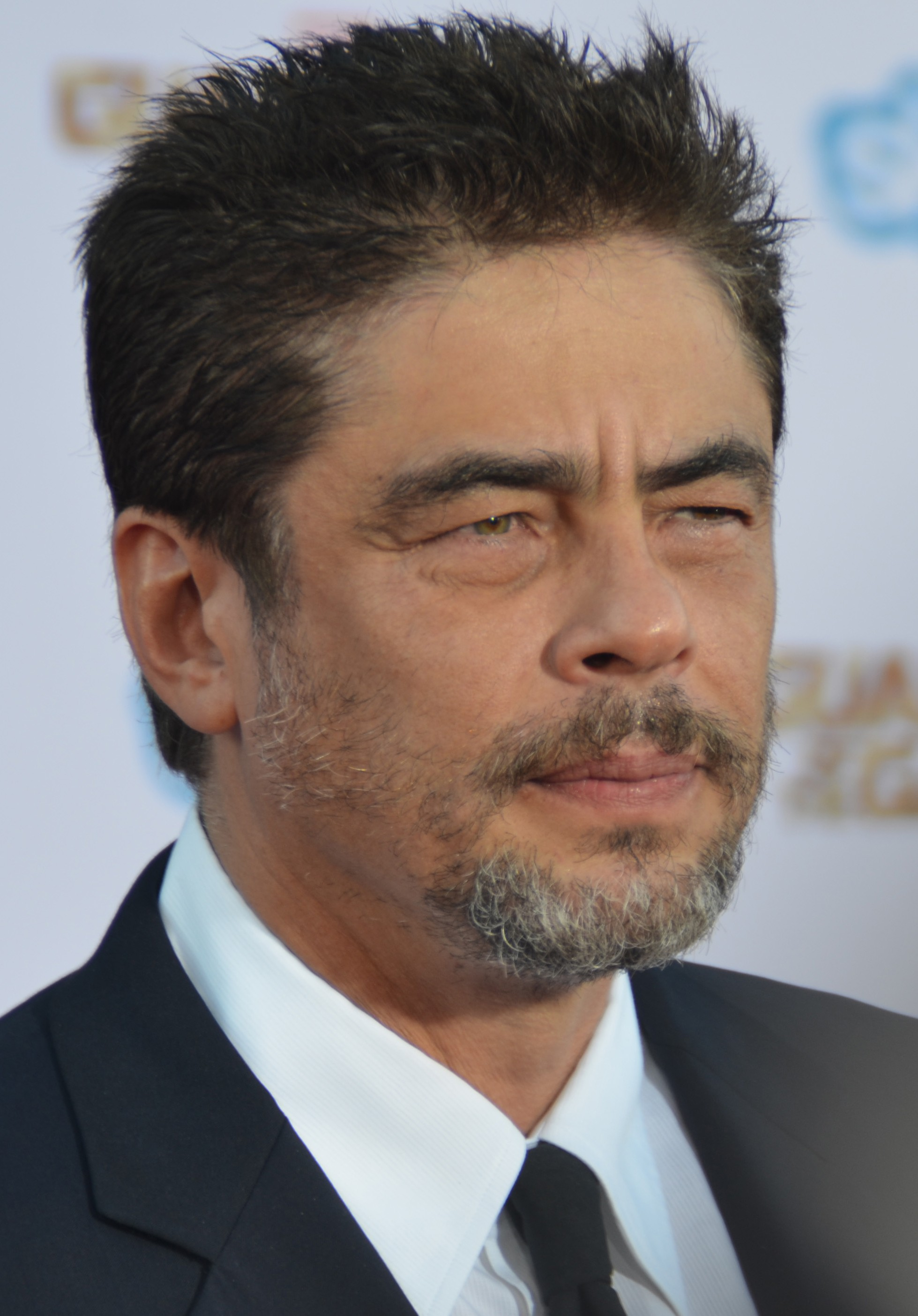
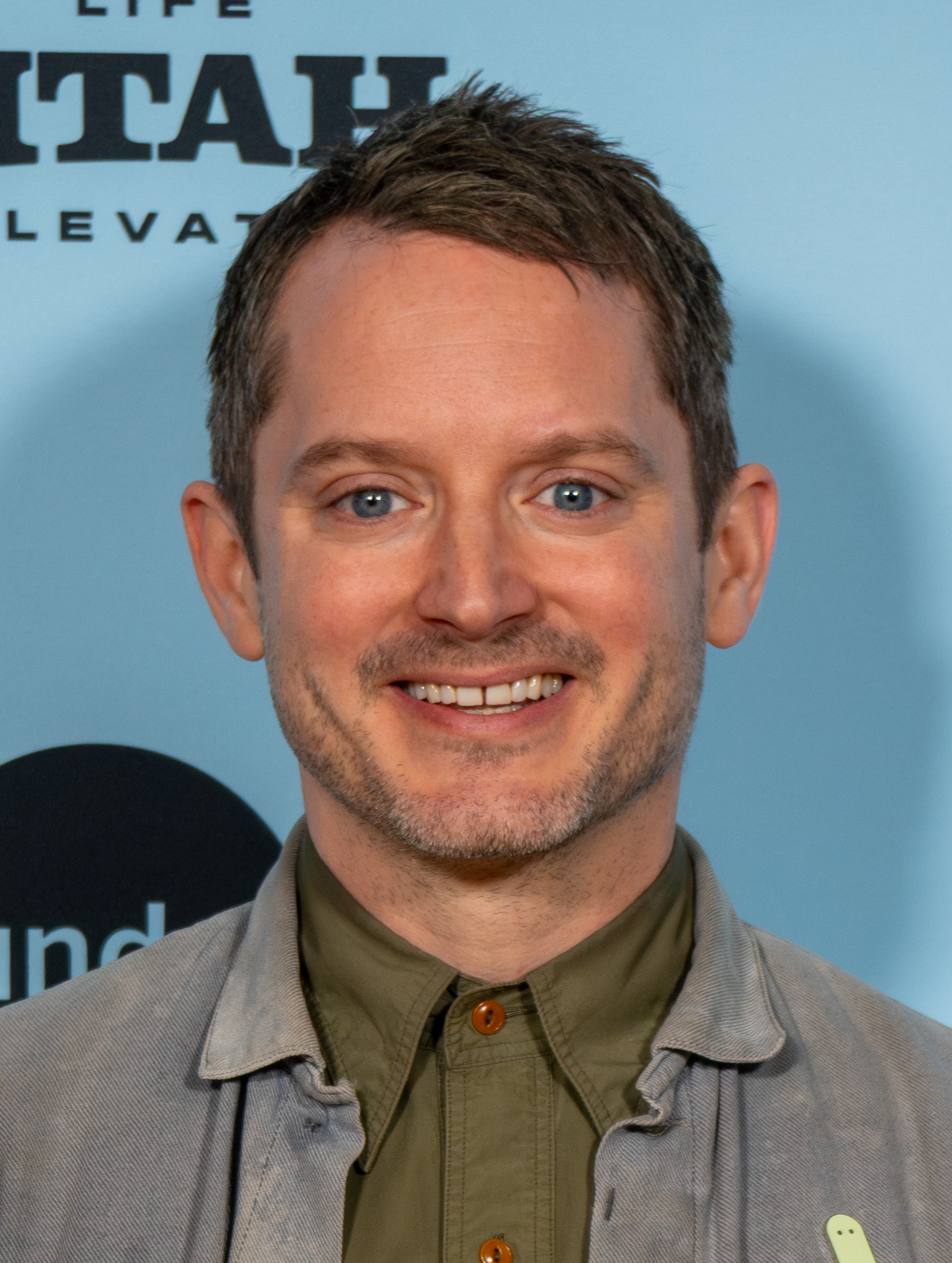
- Top row: (left to right) Bruce Willis, Mickey Rourke and Clive Owen
- Bottom row: (left to right) Jessica Alba, Brittany Murphy, Benicio del Toro and Elijah Wood
- Bruce Willis as Detective John Hartigan
- Mickey Rourke as Marv
- Clive Owen as Dwight McCarthy
- Jessica Alba as Nancy Callahan
  - Makenzie Vega as Nancy (age 11)
- Rosario Dawson as Gail
- Brittany Murphy as Shellie
- Josh Hartnett as The Salesman
- Devon Aoki as Miho
- Marley Shelton as The Customer
- Alexis Bledel as Becky
- Nick Stahl as Ethan Roark Jr.("Junior"/That Yellow Bastard)
- Jaime King as Goldie and Wendy
- Michael Clarke Duncan as Manute
- Michael Madsen as Detective Bob
- Powers Boothe as Senator Ethan Roark
- Jude Ciccolella as Commissioner Liebowitz
- Benicio del Toro as Lieutenant Jack "Iron Jack" Rafferty / "Jackie Boy"
- Rick Gomez as Douglas Klump
- Carla Gugino as Lucille
- Rutger Hauer as Cardinal Patrick Henry Roark
- Nicky Katt as Stuka
- Clark Middleton as Schutz
- Nick Offerman as Burt Schlubb
- Scott Teeters as Lenny and Benny
- Patricia Vonne as Dallas
- Elijah Wood as Kevin
- Tommy Flanagan as Brian
- Lisa Marie Newmyer as Tammy

Frank Miller makes a cameo appearance as a priest, while Robert Rodriguez makes a cameo appearance as a member of the SWAT team.

== Production ==
Becky (Alexis Bledel) walking down a street, an example of the film's neo-noir atmosphere

=== Filming ===
Principal photography began on March 29, 2004. Several of the scenes were shot before any actor had signed on; as a result, several stand-ins were used before the actual actors were digitally added into the film during post-production. Rodriguez, an aficionado of cinematic technology, has used similar techniques in the past. In Roger Ebert's review of the film, he recalled Rodriguez's speech during production of Spy Kids 2: The Island of Lost Dreams: "This is the future! You don't wait six hours for a scene to be lighted. You want a light over here, you grab a light and put it over here. You want a nuclear submarine, you make one out of thin air and put your characters into it." The film was shot with Sony CineAlta F950 cameras on HD-CAM SR format.

The film was noted throughout production for Rodriguez's plan to stay faithful to the source material, unlike most other comic book adaptations. Rodriguez stated that he considered the film to be "less of an adaptation than a translation". As a result, there is no screenwriting credit; simply "Based on the graphic novels by Frank Miller". There were several minor changes, such as dialogue trimming, new colorized objects, removal of some nudity, slightly edited violence, and minor deleted scenes. These scenes were later added in the release of the Sin City Collector's DVD, which also split the books into four separate stories.

=== Music ===
The soundtrack was composed by Rodriguez, John Debney, and Graeme Revell. The film's three main stories were each scored by an individual composer: Revell scored "The Hard Goodbye", Debney scored "The Big Fat Kill", and Rodriguez scored "That Yellow Bastard". Additionally, Rodriguez co-scored with the other two composers on several tracks.

Another notable piece of music used was the instrumental version of the song "Cells" by the London-based alternative group The Servant. The song was heavily featured in the film's publicity, including the promotional trailers and television spots, and was featured on the film's DVD menus.

"Sensemayá" by Silvestre Revueltas is also used on the end sequence of "That Yellow Bastard". Fluke's track "Absurd" is also used when Hartigan first enters Kadie's.

=== Credits ===
Three directors received credit for Sin City: Miller, Rodriguez, and Quentin Tarantino, the last for directing the drive-to-the-pits scene in which Dwight talks with a dead Jack Rafferty (Benicio del Toro). Tarantino was paid one dollar for his work. Miller and Rodriguez worked as a team directing the rest of the film.

When the Directors Guild of America refused to allow two directors who were not an established team to be credited (especially since Miller had never directed before), Rodriguez first planned to give Miller full credit. Miller would not accept this. Rodriguez, also refusing to take full credit, decided to resign from the Guild so that the joint credit could remain.

== Release ==
=== Home media ===
The film was released on DVD and VHS on August 16, 2005. Buena Vista Home Entertainment released a two-disc Blu-ray version with DTS-HD Master Audio, which includes a theatrical and extended, unrated recut of 147 minutes, on April 21, 2009.

On September 30, 2005, The Walt Disney Company finalized its sale of Dimension Films (a sublabel of Miramax) to Bob Weinstein and Harvey Weinstein, who were leaving Miramax's parent company Disney to form a new studio called The Weinstein Company. However, Disney/Miramax retained the rights to all of Dimension's films that had been released up until that point, despite the label itself becoming part of The Weinstein Company from October 1, 2005 onward. Disney eventually sold Miramax and the pre-October 2005 Dimension library to private equity firm Filmyard Holdings in December 2010.

Starting in 2011, Filmyard Holdings began to license the home media rights for various Dimension/Miramax titles to Lionsgate Films. Lionsgate Home Entertainment went on to reissue the film on Blu-ray twice; first on April 26, 2011, and then on May 13, 2014. In 2011, Filmyard Holdings also licensed the Miramax library to streaming site Netflix. This deal included Sin City and ran for five years, eventually ending on June 1, 2016.

In March 2016, Filmyard Holdings sold Miramax and the pre-October 2005 Dimension library to Qatari company beIN Media Group. In April 2020, ViacomCBS (now known as Paramount Skydance) bought a 49% stake in Miramax, which gave them the rights to the Miramax library and the pre-October 2005 Dimension library. Sin City is among the 700 titles they acquired in the deal, and the film has been distributed by Paramount Pictures since April 2020.

In late 2020, Paramount Home Entertainment began reissuing many of the Dimension/Miramax titles they had acquired, and on September 22, 2020, they released another Blu-ray edition of the film. Paramount later made the film available on their subscription streaming service Paramount+, in addition to making it available on their free streaming service Pluto TV.

== Reception ==
Sin City opened on April 1, 2005, to generally positive reviews. On the review aggregator Rotten Tomatoes, the film holds an approval rating of 76% based on 257 reviews, with an average rating of 7.50/10. The website's critical consensus reads: "Visually groundbreaking and terrifically violent, Sin City brings the dark world of Frank Miller's graphic novel to vivid life." On Metacritic the film has a score of 74 (citing "generally favorable reviews") based on 40 reviews. A 2017 data analysis of Metacritic reviews by Gizmodo UK found Sin City to be the third most critically divisive film of recent years. Audiences polled by CinemaScore gave the film an average grade of "B" on an A+ to F scale.

Roger Ebert awarded the film four out of four stars, describing it as "a visualization of the pulp noir imagination, uncompromising and extreme. Yes, and brilliant." Online critical reaction was particularly strong: James Berardinelli placed the film on his list of the "Top Ten" films of 2005. Chauncey Mabe of the Sun-Sentinel wrote: "Really, there will be no reason for anyone to make a comic-book film ever again. Miller and Rodriguez have pushed the form as far as it can possibly go."

Some reviews focused predominantly on the film's more graphic content, criticizing it for a lack of "humanity" and the overwhelmingly dominant themes of violence against women, typically of an exploitative or sexualized nature. William Arnold of the Seattle Post-Intelligencer described it as a celebration of "helpless people being tortured" and "a disturbing gorefest".

The New York Times critic Manohla Dargis gave credit for Rodriguez's "scrupulous care and obvious love for its genre influences", but noted that "it's a shame the movie is kind of a bore" because the director's vision seems to prevail over the intensity of reading a graphic novel.

In a more lighthearted piece focusing on the progression of films and the origins of Sin City, fellow Times critic A. O. Scott, identifying Who Framed Roger Rabbit as its chief cinematic predecessor, argued that "Something is missing – something human. Don't let the movies fool you: Roger Rabbit was guilty," about the increasing use of digitisation within films to replace the human elements. He applauds the fact Rodriguez "has rendered a gorgeous world of silvery shadows that updates the expressionist cinematography of postwar noir" but bemoans that several elements of "old film noirs has been digitally broomed away", resulting instead in a film that "offers sensation without feeling, death without grief, sin without guilt, and, ultimately, novelty without surprise".

Sin City is described as a neo-noir film by some authors.

=== Box office ===
Sin City grossed $29.1 million on its opening weekend in first place, defeating fellow opener Beauty Shop by more than twice its opening take. The film saw a sharp decline in its second weekend, dropping over 50%. Ultimately, the film ended its North American run with a gross of $74.1 million against its $40 million negative cost. Overseas, the film grossed $84.6 million, for a worldwide total from theater receipts of $158.7 million.

=== Accolades ===
Mickey Rourke won a Saturn Award, an Online Film Critics Society Award, a Chicago Film Critics Association Award, and an Irish Film & Television Award for his performance. The film also won the Saturn Awards for Best Action Film and Best DVD Special Edition Release. It was also in competition for the Palme d'Or at the 2005 Cannes Film Festival, and Rodriguez won the Technical Grand Prize for the film's visual shaping. Graeme Revell's work in the film was honored with a Best Film Music Award at the BMI Film & TV Awards.

Sin City was nominated at the 2006 MTV Movie Awards in three categories: Best Movie, Best Kiss for Clive Owen and Rosario Dawson, and Sexiest Performance for Jessica Alba, winning the latter. The film also received three nominations at the 2005 Teen Choice Awards: Choice Action Movie, Choice Action Movie Actress for Jessica Alba and Choice Movie Villain for Elijah Wood.

== Sequel ==
A sequel, Sin City: A Dame to Kill For, was released on August 22, 2014. Production for the sequel began in October 2012 with Robert Rodriguez and Frank Miller directing a script co-written by them and William Monahan. The film was based mainly on A Dame to Kill For, the second book in the Sin City series by Miller, and also included the short story "Just Another Saturday Night" from the Booze, Broads, & Bullets collection, as well as two original stories written by Miller for the film, titled "The Long Bad Night" and "Nancy's Last Dance". Actors Bruce Willis, Mickey Rourke, Rosario Dawson and Jessica Alba reprised their roles in the sequel, amongst others. Unlike the 2005 original, the sequel was a critical and financial failure.

== TV series ==
In 2017, news outlets reported that Dimension Films was developing a soft reboot of the series for television. Stephen L'Heureux, who produced the second film, would have overseen the series with Sin City creator Frank Miller. It would be with new characters and timelines and be more like the comics rather than the films. In November 2019, Deadline reported that Legendary Pictures bought the rights for the television series and are developing both a live action and animated series of Sin City with both Miller and Rodriguez in talks to work on the series as executive producers.

== See also ==
- List of films based on comic books
