= Brona Croft =

Fictional character from Penny Dreadful

Brónagh Croft
- Penny Dreadful character
- Billie Piper as Lily Frankenstein
- First appearance: Seance
- Last appearance: The Blessed Dark
- Created by: John Logan
- Portrayed by: Billie Piper

In-universe information
- Alias: Lily Frankenstein
- Species: Reanimated human
- Gender: Female
- Occupation: Prostitute, Serial killer
- Family: Victor Frankenstein (creator, adoptive cousin)
- Children: Sarah Croft (daughter, deceased)
- Nationality: Irish

Brónagh Croft, later known as Lily Frankenstein, is a character on Showtime's Penny Dreadful, portrayed by Billie Piper. Created by writer John Logan, Brónagh begins the series as an Irish immigrant living in London. An original take on the Bride of Frankenstein story, Piper's character and acting have been acclaimed by critics, calling her "alternately elegant, bewitching, coarse, and frightening."

== Storyline ==
=== Before the series ===
Through conversations with Ethan Chandler (Josh Hartnett) and Victor Frankenstein (Harry Treadaway), Brónagh recounts tales from her past. Born and raised in Belfast, Ireland, she went to London, England to get away from her abusive fiancé, whom her mother was trying to force her to marry for his money. Penniless and alone, she was forced to become a prostitute in order to survive, and suffered frequent beatings and sexual assaults at the hands of her customers.

At some point after coming to London, Brónagh gave birth to a daughter, Sarah. One night, she left Sarah at home by the fire while she went out. She encountered a customer who refused to pay her, and knocked her unconscious. When Brónagh came to, she hurried home, only to find that her daughter had frozen to death.

=== Season One ===
Brónagh Croft lives at the Mariner's Inn in London, and works as a prostitute while trying to find another job. She is slowly dying of tuberculosis, but is unable to pay for medicine. She meets Ethan Chandler, and the two quickly bond. Brónagh goes to the home of Dorian Gray (Reeve Carney), and models for photographs for him. Gray is attracted to her illness, and the two have sex.

Despite her sickness, Brónagh and Ethan fall in love and pursue a relationship. She briefly grows resentful of his wealthy friends, and rejects him. However, she quickly gets over it, and the two resume their relationship.

She eventually becomes bedridden, and coughs up blood constantly. She gives Ethan her pendant of St. Jude, which he will later use during his exorcism of Vanessa Ives (Eva Green). Her sickness gets to the point that she can barely talk, and Ethan begs Dr. Victor Frankenstein to help her.

Victor inspects Brónagh, and claims there is nothing to do but wait for her to succumb to her illness. However, when Ethan steps out, Victor holds a pillow over her face and smothers Brónagh to death. Ethan is distraught, but Victor assures him that he will take care of her body. Secretly, he intends to resurrect Brónagh as his Creature's (Rory Kinnear) undead mate.

=== Season Two ===
Victor resurrects Brónagh, under the name of Lily Frankenstein. Though the Creature is eager to have Lily to himself, Victor insists on having time with Lily to re-acclimate her to life. Lily claims to have no memory of her life before the "accident," and is informed that she is Victor's cousin, and was engaged to marry the Creature, calling himself John Clare.

Though the creature grows impatient, Victor spends more and more time with Lily, and the two appear to fall in love. Victor takes Lily to a ball, where she is re-introduced to Dorian Gray. The two are fascinated with each other, much to both the Creature and Victor's chagrin. One evening, during a thunderstorm, Lily climbs into Victor's bed and takes his virginity.

Despite claiming to be in love with Victor, Lily begins a friendship with Dorian Gray. After an evening out with Dorian, Lily strays from her neighborhood and goes to a pub. A man attempts to seduce her, and she goes back to his house with him. During sex, she strangles him to death and lays with his corpse until morning, claiming to a livid Victor that she fell asleep on a park bench.

Eventually, the Creature grows impatient with Victor's possessiveness of Lily, and confronts her while Victor is away. After Lily rejects him, he attempts to attack her, but she shoves him to the ground and berates him, mocking his ugliness and naivety. She reveals that she knows exactly what she is, and that she knows her resurrection made her immortal. Lily promises that she will never serve another man again, and instead swears that they will kneel to her. She offers the Creature the chance to overthrow mankind with her, but he is terrified and refuses.

Instead, she seeks out Gray, and the two plot "mastery" over the human race. Victor learns of her recent actions, and comes to confront her. With a gun pointed at her, Lily reveals that she knew what was going on all along and who she was before, and claims that she was only pretending to be in love with Victor, waiting for the right time to strike. After she belittles his sexual prowess, Victor shoots her, but she is unfazed. Victor shoots Dorian, too, to no avail, and the two debate killing him. Lily decides to spare her creator, claiming he may be useful to her in the future.

=== Season Three ===
Lily, traumatized by her abuse by men in her past life, organizes a violent crusade against men with the aide of Dorian. The two rescue a young prostitute named Justine (Jessica Barden) from her murderous owners, slaughtering the men who had gathered to watch her death. They take her in, and she quickly becomes devoted to Lily's revolution.

Meanwhile, Victor has become obsessed with getting Lily back, genuinely believing that the two of them could be happy together, despite Lily's insistence that she was never happy with him. With the help of his friend Dr. Henry Jekyll (Shazad Latif), Victor devises a serum that will cure Lily of her anger and pain, and turn her demure and passive. With this, he believes, he can make her love him again.

Lily assembles an army of downtrodden women and prostitutes, indoctrinating them into her misandrist crusade and teaching them how to kill. Victor attempts to kidnap her, but he is stopped by her women. At Dorian's urging, Lily decides to free Victor. Dorian, who has been growing disillusioned with Lily's revolution, claims Victor owes him his life, and intends to collect his debt eventually.

Lily and Gray grow apart, as she is more committed to her crusade than to him. She orders her women to out and take revenge against their abusers, and are later seen dining with a platter of severed hands on the table. She goes out with Dorian, who has secretly coordinated her kidnapping with Victor and Dr. Jekyll. During their walk around London, she is chloroformed and taken to Bedlam Hospital, the site of Dr. Jekyll's laboratory.

Victor intends to inject her with the serum, but she pleads with him not to. Her violence turns to despair as she recounts the death of her daughter years before, and she begs Victor not to take away her memories and her grief, claiming that they are only things that make her human. Victor reluctantly unchains her, and she kisses him before fleeing.

Lily returns to her and Gray's house, to find her army disbanded and Justine dead. Gray laments his boredom with her cause, and explains to her the curse of immortality. He claims her passion will expire eventually, but Lily refuses to live a life without it. She leaves him, with Gray claiming she will be back eventually.

== Production ==
The concept of a female creation by Victor Frankenstein as a mate for his first was originally presented in Mary Shelley's Frankenstein. In that story, however, this second creature is destroyed before she is ever brought to life. The story is then explored in Universal Pictures' 1935 film Bride of Frankenstein. In that film, Victor goes through with the reanimation of his Creature's mate, but she rejects her intended, and the two die in an explosion minutes after her rebirth.

Actress Billie Piper plays a dual role in the series, first as Brónagh Croft, then the resurrected Lily Frankenstein. Creator John Logan has said that the character's third season arc was influenced by Joseph Sheridan Le Fanu's 1871 erotic vampire novella Carmilla. "But Carmilla is wildly erotic and romantic, and that's part of the vampire story, too. This season I go deeper into that idea in Lily's story because Lily has an acolyte named Justine. It's a very dark, romantic relationship between them."

Brónagh is Gaelic for "sadness".

== Reception ==
Piper's performance has been acclaimed by fans and critics. TV Line named her "Performer of the Week," saying "In last Sunday's episode, the actress delivered the former Brónagh Croft's mad speech to her army of fallen women with such intensity and conviction that we didn't just nod along as she decreed "We must be bloody or nothing else!" No, Piper had us so drunk on her character's power that, had she given the order, we, too, might have marched into the streets to retrieve Lily the right hand of a bad man."
