= Blade of grass =

Blade of grass may refer to:

- Grass blade, the leaf of a grass
- Blade of grass sign, in radiology
- "Blade of Grass", an episode of Adventure Time
- "A Blade of Grass" (Penny Dreadful episode)
- "Blade of Grass", a song by Lady Gaga from her seventh studio album, Mayhem.

== See also ==
- No Blade of Grass
- A Single Blade of Grass
