= 13th Visual Effects Society Awards =

US film and TV awards ceremony in 2015

13th Visual Effects Society Awards

February 4, 2015

Best Visual Effects in a Visual Effects Driven Motion Picture:
Dawn of the Planet of the Apes

The 13th Visual Effects Society Awards was held in Los Angeles at the Beverly Hilton Hotel on February 4, 2015, in honor to the best visual effects in film and television of 2014. Patton Oswalt was the host.

== Winners and nominees ==
(winners in bold)

=== Honorary Awards ===
VES Visionary Award:

- **J. J. Abrams**

=== Film ===
Outstanding Visual Effects in a Visual Effects Driven Photoreal/Live Action Feature Motion Picture	Outstanding Supporting Visual Effects in a Photoreal/Live Action Feature Motion Picture
**Dawn of the Planet of the Apes** – Joe Letteri, Ryan Stafford, Matt Kutcher, Dan Lemmon, Hannah Blanchini: Guardians of the Galaxy – Stephane Ceretti, Susan Pickett, Jonathan Fawkner, Nicolas Aithadi, Paul Corbould; The Hobbit: The Battle of the Five Armies – Joe Letteri, David Conley, Eric Saindon, Kevin Sherwood, Steve Ingram; Interstellar – Paul Franklin, Kevin Elam, Ann Podlozny, Andrew Lockley, Scott Fisher; Maleficent – Carey Villegas, Barrie Hemsley, Adam Valdez, Kelly Port, Michael Dawson; X-Men: Days of Future Past – Ricard Stammers, Blondel Aidoo, Lou Pecora, Anders Landlangs, Cameron Waldbauer	**Birdman or (The Unexpected Virtue of Ignorance)** – Ara Khanikian, Ivy Agregan, Sebastien Moreau: Divergent – Jim Berney, Greg Baxter, Matt Dessero; The Grand Budapest Hotel – Gabriel Sanchez, Jenny Foster, Simon Weisse, Jan Burda; The Imitation Game – Stuart Bullen, Lucy Ainsworth-Taylor, Simon Rowe; Unbroken – Bill George, Steve Gaub, Erin Dusseault, Dave Morley, Brian Cox
Outstanding Animation in an Animated Feature Motion Picture	Outstanding Performance of an Animated Character in a Photoreal/Live Action Feature Motion Picture
**Big Hero 6** – Don Hall, Chris Williams, Roy Conli, Zach Parrish: How to Train Your Dragon 2 – Bonnie Arnold, Dean DeBlois, Dave Walvoord, Simon Otto; Rio 2 – Carlos Saldanha, Bruce Anderson, John C. Donkin, Kirk Garfield; The Boxtrolls – Travis Knight, Anthony Stacchi, Graham Annable, Brad Schiff; The Lego Movie – Chris McKay, Amber Naismith, Jim Dodd, David Williams	**Dawn of the Planet of the Apes** - **Caesar** - Paul Story, Eteuati Tema, Andrea Merlo, Emiliano Padovani: Dawn of the Planet of the Apes - Koba - Daniel Barrett, Alessandro Bonora, Mark Edward Allen, Masaya Suzuki; Guardians of the Galaxy - Rocket - Kevin Spruce, Rachel Williams, Laurie Brugger, Mark Wilson; Maleficent - Thistlewit - Darren Hendler, Matthias Wittmann, Jeremy Buttell, Elliot Rosenstein
Outstanding Animated Character in an Animated Feature Motion Picture	Outstanding Created Environment in a Photoreal/Live Action Feature Motion Picture
**Big Hero 6** – **Baymax** – Colin Eckart, John Kahwaty, Zach Parrish, Zack Petroc: How to Train Your Dragon 2 – Hiccup – Jakob Hjort Jensen, Fabio Lignini, Stephen Candell, Hongseo Park; Rio 2 – Gabi – Jason Sadler, Ignacio Barrios, Drew Winey, Diana Diriwaechter; The Boxtrolls – Archibald Snatcher – Travis Knight, Jason Stalman, Michael Laubach, Kyle Williams	**Interstellar** - **Tesseract** - Tom Bracht, Graham Page, Thomas Døhlem, Kristy Clark: Captain America: The Winter Soldier - Triskelion - Johan Thorngren, Greg Kegel, Quentin Marmier, Luis Calero; Lucy - Times Square - Richard Bluff, Steve Bevins, Steve DeLuca, Tiffany Young; Noah - Antediluvian Earth - Grady Cofer, Dan Wheaton, Susumu Yukuhiro, Ben O'Brien
Outstanding Created Environment in an Animated Feature Motion Picture	Outstanding Virtual Cinematography in a Photoreal/Live Action Feature Motion Picture
**Big Hero 6** - **Into the Portal** - Ralf Habel, David Hutchins, Michael Kaschalk, Olun Riley: How to Train Your Dragon 2 - Oasis - Sun Yoon, Liang-Yuan Wang, Ted Davis, Shannon Thomas; The Book of Life - Magical Land of the Remembered - Glo Minaya, Amy Chen, Sean McEwan, Jeff Masters; The Boxtrolls - Boxtroll Cavern - Curt Enderle, Rob DeSue, Emily Greene, Jesse Gregg	**X-Men: Days of Future Past** - **Kitchen Scene** - Austin Bonang, Casey Schatz, Dennis Jones, Newton Thomas Sigel: Dawn of the Planet of the Apes - Keith Miller, Jonathan Paquin, Alessandro Saponi, David Houghton Williams; Edge of Tomorrow - Beach and Paris Attacks - Albert Cheng, Jose Enrique Astacio Jr., Michael Havart, Dion Beebe; Interstellar - Tesseract - Faraz Hameed, Stephen Painter, Hoyte van Hoytema, Dorian Knapp
Outstanding Models in any Motion Media Project	Outstanding Effects Simulations in a Photoreal/Live Action Feature Motion Picture
**Big Hero 6** - **San Fransokyo** - Brett Achorn, Minh Duong, Scott Watanabe, Larry Wu: The Boxtrolls - Mecha-Drill - Tom McClure, Oliver Jones, Raul Martinez; The Hobbit: The Battle of the Five Armies -Laketown - Leslie Chan, Alastair Mayer, Niklas Preston, Justin Stockton; Transformers: Age of Extinction - Knightship - Landis Fields, John Goodson, Anthony Rispoli, Dae Han	**X-Men: Days of Future Past** - **Quicksilver Pentagon Kitchen** - Adam Paschke, Premamurti Paetsch, Sam Hancock, Timmy Lundin: Captain America: The Winter Soldier - Helicarrier broadside and crash - Dan Pearson, Sheldon Serrao, Jose Burgos, Eric Jennings; Edge of Tomorrow - Destruction and Sand - Steve Avoujageli, Pawel Grochola, Atsushi Ikarashi, Paul Waggoner; The Hobbit: The Battle of the Five Armies - Jon allitt, David Caeiro, Ronnie Menahem
Outstanding Effects Simulations in an Animated Feature Motion Picture	Outstanding Compositing in a Photoreal/Live Action Feature Motion Picture
**Big Hero 6** - Henrik Falt, David Hutchins, Michael Kaschalk, John Kosnik: How to Train Your Dragon 2 - The Battle - Spencer Knapp, Baptiste Van Opstal, Lucas Janin, Jason Mayer; The Boxtrolls - Kent Estep, Peter Stuart, Ralph Procida, Timur Khodzhaev; The Lego Movie - Carsten Kolve, Jayandera Danappal, Matt Ebb, Miles Green	**Dawn of the Planet of the Apes** - Christoph Salzmann, Florian Schroeder, Quentin Hema, Simone Riginelli: Edge of Tomorrow - Beach - Craig Wentworth, Matthew Welford, Marie Victoria Denoga, Frank Fieser; Interstellar - Water - Raphael Hamm, Isaac Layish, Sebastian Von Overheidt, Tristan Myles; The Hobbit: The Battle of the Five Armies - Simon Jung, Ben Roberts, Matthew Adams, Jordan Schilling

=== Television ===
Outstanding Visual Effects in a Visual Effects-Driven Photoreal/Live Action Broadcast Program	Outstanding Supporting Visual Effects in a Visual Effects-Driven Photoreal/Live Action Broadcast Program
**Game of Thrones** - **The Children** - Joe Bauer, Steve Kullback, Stuart Brisdon, Thomas Schelesny, Sven Martin: Constantine - A Feast of Friends - Kevin Blank, Elizabeth Castro, Yafei Wu, Chris LeDoux; Hemlock Grove - Matt Whelan, Chris Brown, Todd Masters, Jonathan Banta, Eric McAvoy; Agents of S.H.I.E.L.D. - Mark Kolpack, Sabrina Arnold, Gary D'Amico, Kevin Lingenfelser, David Beedon; The Flash - Armen Kevorkian, James Baldanzi, Jeremy Jozwick, Andranik Taranyan	**American Horror Story: Freak Show** - **Edward Mordrake, Part 2** - Jason Piccioni, Jason Spratt, Mike Kirylo, Justin Bal, Eric Roberts: Black Sails - Episode 1 - Erik Henry, Annemarie Griggs, Paul Graff, George Murphy; Crossbones - Kevin Blank, Ron Pogue, Andy Weder, Niklas Jacobson, Mans Bjorklund; Penny Dreadful - Séance - James Cooper, Bill Halliday, Sarah McMurdo, Lorne Kwechansky; Ripper Street - Whitechapel Terminus - Ed Bruce, Alan Collins, Joe Courtis, John O'Connell
Outstanding Visual Effects in a Commercial	Outstanding Performance of an Animated Character in a Commercial, Broadcast Program or Video Game
**SSE** - **Maya** - Neil Davies, Alex Hammond, Jorge Montiel, Beth Vander: Call of Duty: Advanced Warfare - Discover Your Power - Paul O'Shea, Michael Wigart, Andy Boyd, Jacob Montgomery, Benoit Mannquin; Destiny - Become Legend - Eric Barba, Carla Attanasio, Greg Teegarden, Dan Akers; ESA - Ambition - Jakub Knapik, Tomasz Wachnik, Lukasz Sobisz, Michal Skrzypiec; General Electric - Childlike Imagination - Benjamin Walsh, Jennie Burnett, Brian Burke, Dominik Bauch	**SSE** - **Maya** - Jorge Montiel, Alex Hammond, Daniel Kmet, Philippe Moine: Freesat Freetime - Sheldon - Russell Dodgson, Grant Walker, Juan Sebastian Nino, Amar Chundavadra; Game of Thrones - Drogon - Philip Meyer, Thomas Kutschera, Igor Majdandzic, Mark Spindler; John Lewis - Monty the Penguin - Diarmid Harrison Murray, Tim Van Hussen, Amir Bazazi, Georgios Kyparissous
Outstanding Created Environment in a Commercial, Broadcast Program or Video Game	Outstanding Effects Simulations in a Commercial, Broadcast Program, or Video Game
**Game of Thrones** - **Braavos Establisher** - Rene Borst, Christian Zilliken, Jan Burda, Steffen Metzner: Coca-Cola - Snowy Forest - Tom Bardwell, Kevin Ives, Kyle Cody, Jimmy Gass; Penny Dreadful -Séance - Matthew Borrett, Lorne Kqechansky, Graham Day, Jason Gougeon; War Thunder - Battlefield - Andrey Bogdanov, Mikhail Datcik, Dmitriy Ovcharenko, Ekaterina Bogdanova	**Cosmos: A Spacetime Odyssey** - Dominique Vidal, Isabelle Perin-Leduc, Sandrine Lurde, Alexandre Lerouge: Direct TV - Landing - Jeffrey Dates, Jimmy Gass, Iwan Zwarts, Ryan Coster; SSE - Maya - Alex Hammond, Peter Agg, Sam Driscoll, Jimmy Gass; Vikings - Invasion Storm Sequence - Jeremy Dineen, Eric Lacroix, Kyle Yoneda, Norman Ran
Outstanding Compositing in a Photoreal/Live Action Broadcast Program	Outstanding Compositing in a Photoreal/Live Action Commercial
**Game of Thrones** - **The Watchers on the Wall** - Dan Breckwoldt, Martin Furman, Sophie Marfleet, Eric Andrusyszyn: American Horror Story: Freak Show - Edward Mordrake, Part 2 - Tommy Tran, JV Pike, Rob Lutz, Matt Lefferts; Game of Thrones - Wight Attack - Keegan Douglas, Okan Ataman, Brian Fortune, David Lopez; The Knick - Abigail's Nose - Vance Miller, Aaron Raff, John Bair, Rebecca Dunn; Vikings - Invasion - Ovidiu Cinazan, Gary Couto, Doug Cook, Angel Li	**SSE** - Neil Davies, Leonardo Costa, Gianluca DiMarco: Destiny - Become Legend - Dan Akers, Nitant Karnik, Matt Smith, Kym Olsen; Kia the Truth - Paul Lambert, Dan Akers, Carlos Morales, Holly Horter; Nike Hypervenom - Mirrors ft. Neymar Jr. - Dan Williams, Daniel Morris, Ilia Mokhtareizadeh, Greg Spencer

=== Other categories ===
Outstanding Real-Time Visuals in a Video Game	Outstanding Visual Effects in a Special Venue Project
**Call of Duty: Advanced Warfare** - Yi-chao Sandy Lin-Chiang, Joseph Salud, Demetrius Leal, Dave Blizard: Alien: Isolation - Jude Bond, Al Hope, Howard Rayner, Oriol Sans Gomez; Infamous Second Son - Matt Vainio, Horia Dociu, Jason Connell, Bill Rockenbeck; Sunset Overdrive - Jacinda Chew, Bryan Intihar, Grant Hollis	**Ratatouille: L’Aventure Totalement Toquée de Rémy** - Tony Apodaca, Marianna McLean, Gilles Martin, Edwin Chang, Mark Mine: Hubei in the Air - Andrew Roberts, Claudia Lachnitt, Yas Takata, Boris Schmidt, Sebastian Butenberg; Star Journey - Adam Watkins, Viktorija Ogureckaja, Thilo Ewers, Omid Arzhang, Yas Takata; Hogwarts Express (Universal Orlando Resort) - Chris Shaw, Rich Yeomans, Steven Godfrey, Peter Jopling, John Richardson; The Lost Temple - John Hughes, Walt Jones, Brent Young, Michael Smith
Outstanding Visual Effects in a Student Project	
**Wrapped** - Roman Kaelin, Falko Paeper, Florian Wittmann, Paolo Tamburrino: Deep Dance - Marco Erbich, Christoph Westphal, Vincent Langer; Dragon Clan - Yaui Fan, Sheng Xu; Murphy - Bruno LeVeque, Xavier Lafarge	
