= Penny Dreadful (TV series) =

2014 horror drama television series

- Genre: Drama; Gothic horror; Historical fantasy
- Created by: John Logan
- Written by: John Logan; Andrew Hinderaker; Krysty Wilson-Cairns
- Starring: Reeve Carney; Timothy Dalton; Eva Green; Rory Kinnear; Billie Piper; Danny Sapani; Harry Treadaway; Josh Hartnett; Helen McCrory; Simon Russell Beale; Patti LuPone; Wes Studi
- Theme music composer: Abel Korzeniowski; Tom Kitt (series finale)
- Opening theme: "Demimonde" by Abel Korzeniowski; "A Prayer" by Sophie Meade (series finale)
- Composer: Abel Korzeniowski
- Countries of origin: United States; United Kingdom
- Original language: English
- No. of seasons: 3
- No. of episodes: 27 (list of episodes)

Production
- Executive producers: Pippa Harris; Sam Mendes; John Logan; Karen Richards
- Producers: James Flynn; Morgan O'Sullivan; Sheila Hockin
- Production locations: Dublin; London
- Cinematography: Xavi Giménez; Nigel Willoughby; P. J. Dillon; Owen McPolin; John Conroy
- Editors: Geoff Ashenhurst; Aaron Marshall; Michele Conroy; Christopher Donaldson
- Running time: 47–60 minutes
- Production companies: Desert Wolf Productions; Neal Street Productions; Showtime Networks

Original release
- Network: Showtime (US); Sky Atlantic (UK)
- Release: May 11, 2014 – June 19, 2016

Related
- Penny Dreadful: City of Angels

Penny Dreadful is a horror drama television series created for Showtime and Sky by John Logan, who also acts as executive producer alongside Sam Mendes. The show was originally pitched to several American and British channels, and eventually landed with Showtime, with Sky Atlantic as co-producer. It premiered at the South by Southwest film festival on March 9 and began airing on television on April 28, 2014, on Showtime on Demand. The series premiered on Showtime in the United States on May 11, 2014, and on Sky Atlantic in the United Kingdom on May 20, 2014. After the third-season finale on June 19, 2016, series creator John Logan announced that Penny Dreadful had ended as the main story had reached its conclusion.

The title refers to the penny dreadfuls, a type of 19th-century British fiction publication with lurid and sensational subject matter. The series draws upon many public domain characters from 19th-century Victorian Gothic fiction, including Dorian Gray from Oscar Wilde's The Picture of Dorian Gray; Mina Harker, Abraham Van Helsing, John Seward, Renfield, and Count Dracula from Bram Stoker's Dracula; Victor Frankenstein and his monster from Mary Shelley's Frankenstein; and Henry Jekyll from Robert Louis Stevenson's Strange Case of Dr Jekyll and Mr Hyde, showing their origin stories as an explorer searches for his daughter. Justine from Justine, or The Misfortunes of Virtue by the Marquis de Sade also appears.

A spin-off series, Penny Dreadful: City of Angels, aired a single season in 2020.

== Plot ==
The first season begins in London, 1891. Ethan Chandler, an American gunman and roadshow artist, is hired by the adventurer-explorer Malcolm Murray and the mysterious Vanessa Ives to help rescue Murray's daughter from a mysterious creature. They receive help from a young doctor named Victor Frankenstein who soon is stalked by an undead creature he once reanimated and abandoned. Ives becomes romantically involved with the handsome, artistic Dorian Gray but also finds herself haunted by Lucifer, who wishes to make her his bride and queen.

In the second season, Ives is hunted by a coven of witches led by the charismatic Evelyn Poole, who wants to deliver Ives to Lucifer. Frankenstein is forced to make his creature a bride, and an inspector investigates a grisly murder that Chandler committed in a London inn.

In the third season, the main characters find themselves scattered across the world – Ives is in London, consulting the alienist Florence Seward, Ethan is being extradited to the United States, and Murray is in Zanzibar. Ives soon enters a relationship with zoologist Alexander Sweet, the secret identity of Lucifer's brother, Count Dracula.

== Episodes ==
Season	Episodes	Originally released	
Season	Episodes	First released	Last released
1	8	May 11, 2014	June 29, 2014
2	10	May 3, 2015	July 5, 2015
3	9	May 1, 2016	June 19, 2016

== Cast and characters ==
=== Main cast ===
- Reeve Carney as Dorian Gray, a charismatic man who is ageless and immortal
- Timothy Dalton as Malcolm Murray, a hardened explorer-adventurer of the African continent, on a deeply personal quest to save the remaining members of his family
- Eva Green as Vanessa Ives, an enigmatic, quietly driven heroine who proves herself a force to be reckoned with as she battles powerful, relentless forces from the underworld
- Rory Kinnear as the Creature, a creation Frankenstein abruptly abandoned, who, not given a name, variously uses the aliases Caliban and John Clare
- Billie Piper as Brona Croft / Lily Frankenstein, an Irish immigrant seeking to escape her brutal, violent past
- Danny Sapani as Sembene (seasons 1–2), a mysterious, long-time ally of Malcolm
- Harry Treadaway as Victor Frankenstein, an arrogant, socially inept young doctor whose ambition and research involve transcending the barrier between life and death
- Josh Hartnett as Ethan Chandler (born Ethan Lawrence Talbot), a charming, brash and daring American man of action with uncanny marksmanship, who detests violence, and is more complicated than he likes to admit
- Helen McCrory as Evelyn Poole a.k.a. Evelyn Paul (season 2, recurring season 1), a professional spiritualist known by the alias Madame Kali who is secretly the leader of a powerful coven of witches called "Nightcomers"
- Simon Russell Beale as Ferdinand Lyle (season 2, recurring seasons 1 and 3), an eccentric Egyptologist
- Patti LuPone as Florence Seward (season 3), an alienist or early psychotherapist treating Vanessa's depression
  - LuPone previously guest-starred as Joan Clayton in season 2
- Wes Studi as Kaetenay (season 3), an Apache with a connection to Ethan, who becomes an ally to Malcolm

=== Supporting cast ===
==== Introduced in season 1 ====
- Olivia Llewellyn as Mina Harker (seasons 1–2), Malcolm's daughter and Vanessa's childhood friend who has been abducted
- Alex Price as Proteus (seasons 1–2), a new creation of Dr. Frankenstein's, named after the literary character of the same name, who was killed by the Creature
- Lorcan Cranitch as Inspector Goldsworthy (season 1), of the London police
- Robert Nairne as the Vampire (season 1), an evil creature who leads a cabal of undead and who abducted Mina Harker
- Olly Alexander as Fenton (season 1), a vampire minion
- Graham Butler as Peter Murray (seasons 1–2), Malcolm's son, who died accompanying his father on one of his expeditions
- Noni Stapleton as Gladys Murray (seasons 1–2), Malcolm's estranged wife and mother of Mina and Peter
- Alun Armstrong as Vincent Brand (season 1), the leader of a troupe of actors in residence at the Grand Guignol
- Hannah Tointon as Maud Gunneson (season 1), an actress at the Grand Guignol, and object of the Creature's affection
- Gavin Fowler as Simon (season 1), Maud's partner who mistreats the Creature
- David Warner as Abraham Van Helsing (season 1), a haematologist and colleague of Frankenstein
- Stephen Lord as Warren Roper (seasons 1–2), a Pinkerton agent hired to bring Ethan back to the United States

==== Introduced in season 2 ====
- Sarah Greene as Hecate Poole (seasons 2–3), Evelyn's eldest daughter
- Nicole O'Neill, Olivia Chenery and Charlotte Beckett as minor witches of Evelyn's coven (season 2)
- Douglas Hodge as Bartholomew Rusk (seasons 2–3), a Scotland Yard police inspector investigating the grisly Mariner's Inn Massacre
- Jack Hickey as the junior inspector working with Rusk (seasons 2–3)
- Jonny Beauchamp as Angelique (season 2), a mysterious transgender woman who gains Dorian's attention
- David Haig as Oscar Putney (season 2), the owner of a struggling wax museum who employs the Creature for his own nefarious reasons
- Ruth Gemmell as Octavia Putney (season 2), Oscar's wife who is uneasy about the Creature and treats him cruelly
- Tamsin Topolski as Lavinia Putney (season 2), the blind daughter of the Creature's new employers, with whom he develops a friendship
- Ronan Vibert as Geoffrey Hawkes (season 2), a rich landowner who fell under Evelyn's sway

==== Introduced in season 3 ====
- Shazad Latif as Henry Jekyll / Hyde, a chemist and college friend of Victor Frankenstein
- Christian Camargo as Dracula, the brother of Lucifer who fell to Earth to feed on the blood of the living as the first vampire. In London, he takes the guise of kindly zoologist Alexander Sweet to captivate Vanessa
- Samuel Barnett as Renfield, Florence Seward's secretary who becomes involved with Dracula
- Sebastian Croft and Jack Greenlees as minor vampires serving Dracula
- Casper Allpress and Pandora Colin as Jack and Marjorie, the Creature's son and wife from when he was still alive
- Cokey Falkow as Scarman, a gunman in the service of Ethan's father
- Jessica Barden as Justine, a homeless, brutalized young prostitute who becomes an acolyte to Lily
- Sean Gilder as Franklin Ostow, a marshal in the American West aiding Rusk in the hunt for Ethan
- Brian Cox as Jared Talbot, a ruthless, powerful American rancher and the estranged father of Ethan
- Perdita Weeks as Catriona Hartdegen, a thanatologist scholar with expert knowledge of the supernatural

Notable non-recurring cast include Mary Stockley as Victor Frankenstein's mother Caroline, Anna Chancellor as Vanessa's mother Claire, and Frank McCusker as Christopher Banning, a doctor overseeing Vanessa's treatment while institutionalized, all appearing in flashbacks during the first season, as well as Oliver Cotton as Father Matthew, having been requested to perform an exorcism on Vanessa in the first season's penultimate episode.

== Production and development ==
In January 2013, it was announced that Showtime had made a series commitment for the project. Logan and Mendes previously wrote and directed Skyfall, respectively. Production began in London in the second half of 2013. Showtime president David Nevins stated that the tone of the ensemble series will be "very realistic and very grounded, not Bela Lugosi. All exist in human form in turn-of-century London." This was also reflected during production of the sound for the show, where Logan often pulled things back towards more realism. Logan, a lifelong fan of literary monsters, wrote the project on spec and scripts the majority of episodes of the series. It was intended that Mendes would direct episodes, but scheduling prevented this.

Juan Antonio Bayona was announced as director for the first two episodes. The remaining episodes of the first season were directed by Dearbhla Walsh, Coky Giedroyc, and James Hawes.

In March 2013, it was announced that the series would be filmed in the United Kingdom to take advantage of the new UK tax credit for high-end TV productions that offered a 25% rebate. However, it was reported in August that production would instead take place in Bray's Ardmore Studios and other locations around Dublin, Ireland, because of the country's section 481 tax incentives. Filming began on October 7 and lasted 5 months. Reports indicated that the change was made as no stage space of a sufficient caliber was available due to the filming of major motion pictures in London.

In December 2013, Showtime announced its first production blog for a series with the launch of The Penny Dreadful Production Blog. The venue gave viewers an online, behind-the-scenes look at the series' production from its early stages of filming in Ireland through the end of the first season, featuring interviews with cast and crew. In February 2014, Showtime released a full-length trailer for the series.

Logan revealed at the 2014 San Diego Comic-Con panel that one of the texts he thought about while planning the series that he would like to use in a future season is The Island of Doctor Moreau. In an interview with Entertainment Weekly prior to the premiere of the third season, Logan stated that the addition of Dr. Henry Jekyll was implemented because the rights to Doctor Moreau were not available.

Showtime had announced season renewals shortly before the ends of the first and second seasons; however, Logan had decided during the middle of the second season that the third season should be the last, and he pitched the third season to Showtime president David Nevins accordingly. They did not release this information until after the final season had completed, as Nevins stated, "given what I knew the ending of Penny Dreadful was going to be felt like a massive spoiler and it felt disrespectful to the experience that people were having with the show." Logan said regarding not releasing the information, "That's what the ending of this series is, it is meant to be a strong, bold, theatrical ending because I think that's what our fans like and to water that down with an announcement or having them know I think would be an act of bad faith."

== Reception ==
=== Critical reception ===
Critical response of Penny Dreadful
Season	Rotten Tomatoes	Metacritic
1	81% (62 reviews)	70 (37 reviews)
2	100% (21 reviews)	77 (14 reviews)
3	93% (15 reviews)	83 (9 reviews)

The first season of Penny Dreadful received positive reviews from critics, with a Metacritic rating of 70 out of 100 based on 37 reviews. It holds an 81 percent rating on Rotten Tomatoes, with an average score of 7.4 out of 10, based on 62 reviews, with the site's consensuses stating, "Skillfully shot and superbly acted, Penny Dreadful is perplexing in a good way – even if it's a bit silly at times." The first season was described "as riotous as it is ridiculous, taking the macabre to new heights (or depths)" by The Guardian reviewer Ben Hewitt.

The second season also received positive reviews from critics. On Metacritic, it has a score of 77 out of 100 based on 14 reviews, indicating "generally favorable reviews". On Rotten Tomatoes, it holds a 100 percent rating with an average score of 7.7 out of 10 based on 21 reviews, with the site's consensus stating, "Penny Dreadful's second season maintains the show's intense, bloody drama, utilizing a vast array of fascinating characters and locales to tell a unique story."

The third season received critical acclaim. On Metacritic, it has a score of 83 out of 100 based on 9 reviews, indicating "universal acclaim". On Rotten Tomatoes, it holds a 93 percent rating with an average score of 8.1 out of 10 based on 15 reviews, with the site's consensuses stating, "Penny Dreadful is back for a beautifully bloody third season of ever-expanding mysteries and Gothic horrors." Ben Travers of Indiewire gave it a B+ grade and wrote, "Season 3's American-set storyline breaks things up nicely with some classic western elements mixed in with the show's established creature horrors, and the aesthetics of the production have never looked better."

=== Ratings ===
The series debuted to 872,000 viewers (1.44 million including re-runs). This number does not include the 900,000 viewers who previewed the series on Showtime on Demand and the Showtime app.

=== Accolades ===
Year	Award	Category	Nominee(s)	Result
2014	Critics' Choice Television Awards	Most Exciting New Series	Penny Dreadful	Won
2015	BAFTA Television Craft Awards	Best Costume Design	Gabriella Pescucci	Nominated
2015	BAFTA Television Craft Awards	Best Make Up and Hair Design	Enzo Mastrantonio, Nick Dudman, Stefano Ceccarelli	Won
2015	BAFTA Television Craft Awards	Best Original Television Music	Abel Korzeniowski	Won
2015	BAFTA Television Craft Awards	Best Production Design	Jonathan McKinstry, Philip Murphy	Won
2015	BAFTA Television Craft Awards	Best Titles	Erik Friedman, Rudy Jaimes, Ray Burris	Nominated
2015	British Society of Cinematographers Awards	Best Cinematography in a Television Drama	PJ Dillon (for "And They Were Enemies")	Nominated
2015	Canadian Cinema Editors Awards	Best Editing in Long Form Television Series	Christopher Donaldson (for: "Closer than Sisters")	Won
2015	Critics' Choice Television Awards	Best Actress in a Drama Series	Eva Green	Nominated
2015	Dorian Awards	Campy TV Show of the Year	Penny Dreadful	Nominated
2015	Fangoria Chainsaw Awards	Best TV Actor	Josh Hartnett	Nominated
2015	Fangoria Chainsaw Awards	Best TV Actress	Eva Green	2nd place
2015	Fangoria Chainsaw Awards	Best TV Makeup/Creature FX	Nick Dudman	Nominated
2015	Fangoria Chainsaw Awards	Best TV Series	Penny Dreadful	Nominated
2015	Fangoria Chainsaw Awards	Best TV Supporting Actor	Rory Kinnear	Nominated
2015	Fangoria Chainsaw Awards	Best TV Supporting Actress	Billie Piper	3rd place
2015	IGN Awards	Best TV Actress	Eva Green	Won
2015	International Film Music Critics Awards	Best Original Score for a Television Series	Abel Korzeniowski	Nominated
2015	Irish Film & Television Awards	Best Director – Drama	Dearbhla Walsh	Nominated
2015	MPSE Golden Reel Awards	Best Sound Editing – Dialogue and ADR for Short Form Television	Jane Tattersall, David McCallum, Dale Sheldrake (for: "Séance")	Nominated
2015	MPSE Golden Reel Awards	Best Sound Editing – Sound Effects and Foley for Short Form Television	Jane Tattersall, Oriol Tarragó, Andy Malcolm, Goro Koyama, David Rose, Marc Bech (for: "Night Work")	Nominated
2015	Primetime Creative Arts Emmy Awards	Outstanding Main Title Theme Music	Abel Korzeniowski	Nominated
2015	Primetime Creative Arts Emmy Awards	Outstanding Music Composition for a Series (Original Dramatic Score)	Abel Korzeniowski (for: "Closer than Sisters")	Nominated
2015	Primetime Creative Arts Emmy Awards	Outstanding Prosthetic Makeup for a Series, Limited Series, Movie, or a Special	Nick Dudman, Sarita Allison, Barney Nikolic (for: "Grand Guignol")	Nominated
2015	Satellite Awards	Best Actress – Television Series Drama	Eva Green	Nominated
2015	Satellite Awards	Best Supporting Actor – Series, Miniseries or Television Film	Rory Kinnear	Won
2015	Satellite Awards	Best Television Series – Genre	Penny Dreadful	Won
2015	VES Awards	Outstanding Created Environment in a Commercial, Broadcast Program or Video Game	Matthew Borrett, Lorne Kqechansky, Graham Day, Jason Gougeon (for: "Séance")	Nominated
2015	VES Awards	Outstanding Supporting Visual Effects in a Visual Effects-Driven Photoreal/Live Action Broadcast Program	James Cooper, Bill Halliday, Sarah McMurdo, Lorne Kwechansky (for: "Séance")	Nominated
2016	BAFTA Television Craft Awards	Best Make Up and Hair	Enzo Mastrantonio, Nick Dudman, Ferdinando Merolla	Nominated
2016	Costume Designers Guild Awards	Outstanding Period Television Series	Gabriella Pescucci	Nominated
2016	Critics' Choice Television Awards	Best Actress in a Drama Series	Eva Green	Nominated
2016	Critics' Choice Television Awards	Best Drama Series	Penny Dreadful	Nominated
2016	Critics' Choice Television Awards	Best Guest Performer in a Drama Series	Patti LuPone	Nominated
2016	Critics' Choice Television Awards	Best Supporting Actress in a Drama Series	Helen McCrory	Nominated
2016	Fangoria Chainsaw Awards	Best TV Actor	Josh Hartnett	Nominated
2016	Fangoria Chainsaw Awards	Best TV Actress	Eva Green	Won
2016	Fangoria Chainsaw Awards	Best TV Series	Penny Dreadful	Nominated
2016	Fangoria Chainsaw Awards	Best TV Supporting Actor	Rory Kinnear	Nominated
2016	Fangoria Chainsaw Awards	Best TV Supporting Actress	Billie Piper	Nominated
2016	Golden Globe Awards	Best Actress – Television Series Drama	Eva Green	Nominated
2016	IGN Awards	Best Horror Series	Penny Dreadful	Nominated
2016	Irish Film & Television Awards	Best Actress in a Supporting Role – Drama	Sarah Greene	Won
2016	Irish Film & Television Awards	Best Director – Drama	Brian Kirk	Nominated
2016	Irish Film & Television Awards	Best Drama	Penny Dreadful	Nominated
2016	Make-Up Artists and Hair Stylists Guild Awards	Television and New Media – Best Period and/or Character Make-Up	Enzo Mastrantonio, Clare Lambe	Nominated
2016	Make-Up Artists and Hair Stylists Guild Awards	Television and New Media Series – Best Special Make-Up Effects	Nick Dudman, Sarita Allison	Nominated
2016	Satellite Awards	Best Supporting Actress – Series, Miniseries or Television Film	Helen McCrory	Nominated
2016	Satellite Awards	Best Television Series – Genre	Penny Dreadful	Nominated
2016	Primetime Creative Arts Emmy Awards	Outstanding Hairstyling for a Single-Camera Series	Ferdinando Merolla, Sevlene Roddy, Giuliano Mariano, Orla Carroll (for: "Glorious Horrors")	Nominated
2016	Primetime Creative Arts Emmy Awards	Outstanding Makeup for a Single-Camera Series (Non-Prosthetic)	Enzo Mastrantanio, Clare Lambe, Caterina Sisto, Lorraine McCrann, Morna Ferguson (for: "Glorious Horrors")	Nominated
2016	Primetime Creative Arts Emmy Awards	Outstanding Music Composition for a Series (Original Dramatic Score)	Abel Korzeniowski (for: "And They Were Enemies")	Nominated
2016	Primetime Creative Arts Emmy Awards	Outstanding Production Design for a Narrative Contemporary or Fantasy Program (One Hour or More)	Jonathan McKinstry, Jo Riddel, Philip Murphy (for: "Fresh Hell", "Evil Spirits in Heavenly Places", "And Hell Itself My Only Foe")	Nominated
2016	Primetime Creative Arts Emmy Awards	Outstanding Prosthetic Makeup for a Series, Limited Series, Movie, or a Special	Nick Dudman, Sarita Allison, Barney Nikolic, Paul Spateri, Dennis Penkov (for: "And Hell Itself My Only Foe")	Nominated
2016	Primetime Creative Arts Emmy Awards	Outstanding Special Visual Effects	James Cooper, Bill Halliday, Sarah McMurdo, Mai-Ling Lee, Greg Astles, Ricardo Gomez, Matt Ralph, Alexandre Scott, Kyle Yoneda (for: "And They Were Enemies")	Nominated
2016	Visual Effects Society Awards	Outstanding Supporting Visual Effects in a Photoreal Episode	James Cooper, Bill Halliday, Sarah McMurdo, Mai-Ling Lee (for: "And They Were Enemies")	Nominated
2017	Bram Stoker Awards	Superior Achievement in a Screenplay	John Logan (for: "A Blade of Grass")	Nominated
2017	Canadian Cinema Editors Awards	Best Editing in 1 Hour Scripted	Aaron Marshall (for: "A Blade of Grass")	Won
2017	Costume Designers Guild Awards	Outstanding Period Television Series	Gabriella Pescucci	Nominated
2017	Directors Guild of Canada Awards	Best Picture Editing – Television Series	Geoff Ashenhurst (for: "The Blessed Dark")	Nominated
2017	Directors Guild of Canada Awards	Best Picture Editing – Television Series	Christopher Donaldson (for: "The Day Tennyson Died")	Nominated
2017	Edgar Awards	TV Episode Teleplay	John Logan (for: "A Blade of Grass")	Won
2017	Fangoria Chainsaw Awards	Best TV Actor	Josh Hartnett	Nominated
2017	Fangoria Chainsaw Awards	Best TV Actress	Eva Green	Nominated
2017	Golden Reel Awards	Best Sound Editing: TV Short Form – Dialogue/ADR	David McCallum (for: "Ebb Tide")	Won
2017	Make-Up Artists & Hair Stylists Guild Awards	TV and New Media Series – Best Period/Character Make-Up	Enzo Mastrantonio, Clare Lambe	Nominated
2017	Make-Up Artists & Hair Stylists Guild Awards	TV and New Media Series – Best Period/Character Hair Styling	Luca Vannella, Alexis Continente	Nominated
2017	Make-Up Artists & Hair Stylists Guild Awards	Television and New Media Series – Best Special Make-Up Effects	Nick Dudman, Sarita Allison	Nominated
2017	Primetime Creative Arts Emmy Awards	Outstanding Hairstyling for a Single-Camera Series	Luca Vannella, Alexis Continente, Sevlene Roddy, Joseph Whelan, Orla Carrol (for: "Ebb Tide")	Nominated
2017	Primetime Creative Arts Emmy Awards	Outstanding Makeup for a Single-Camera Series (Non-Prosthetic)	Enzo Mastrantonio, Clare Lambe, Caterina Sisto, Lorraine McCrann, Morna Ferguson (for: "Perpetual Night")	Nominated
2017	Primetime Creative Arts Emmy Awards	Outstanding Prosthetic Makeup for a Series, Limited Series, Movie, or Special	Nick Dudman, Sarita Allison, Barney Nikolic, Dennis Penkov (for: "No Beast So Fierce")	Nominated
2017	Primetime Creative Arts Emmy Awards	Outstanding Production Design for a Narrative Contemporary or Fantasy Program (One Hour or More)	Jonathan McKinstry, Jo Riddell, Philip Murphy (for: "Perpetual Night" / "The Blessed Dark")	Nominated
2017	Visual Effects Society Awards	Outstanding Supporting Visual Effects in a Photoreal Episode	James Cooper, Bill Halliday, Sarah McMurdo, Mai-Ling Lee (for: "The Day Tennyson Died")	Nominated

== Related media ==
=== Comics ===
In 2015, Titan Books announced a comic book series based on Penny Dreadful, written by co-executive producer Chris King and writers Krysty Wilson-Cairns and Andrew Hinderaker. The first issue was released on May 11, 2016. It served as a prequel to the TV series.

In October 2016, Showtime announced that a new comic book series would be released in 2017, set six months after the finale of the TV series. The series consisted of three volumes: Penny Dreadful: The Awakening (2017), Penny Dreadful: The Beauteous Evil (2018), and Penny Dreadful: The Victory of Death (2019), all written by King, illustrated by Jesús Hervás, and published by Titan Books.

=== Spin-off series ===
In November 2018, a spin-off series, Penny Dreadful: City of Angels was announced by Showtime. It is set in 1938 and centers on Mexican-American folklore and social tension of the era in Los Angeles, California. The series started production in August 2019 and stars Daniel Zovatto, Nathan Lane, Natalie Dormer, Kerry Bishé, Rory Kinnear, Adriana Barraza, Michael Gladis, Jessica Garza and Johnathan Nieves. It premiered on April 26, 2020. On August 21, 2020, the series was cancelled after one season.

=== Other ===
Thibaud Villanova's 2024 book Gastronogeek: Gothic Recipes contained recipes based on several TV series and films, including "A Padded Stew: Beef Stew with Beer" for Penny Dreadful.

== See also ==
- Frankenstein in popular culture
- Dracula in popular culture
- Neo-Victorian
- The League of Extraordinary Gentlemen, a comic series written by Alan Moore with a similar premise of characters from public domain literature teaming up to fight the forces of evil.
- Vampire film
- List of vampire television series
