= Vanessa Ives =

Fictional character from Penny Dreadful

- Penny Dreadful character
- Eva Green as Vanessa Ives
- First appearance: "Night Work"
- Last appearance: "The Blessed Dark"
- Created by: John Logan
- Portrayed by: Eva Green

In-universe information
- Gender: Female
- Nationality: British

Vanessa Ives is a fictional character in Penny Dreadful, portrayed by Eva Green in the Showtime series created by John Logan. Ives is the main protagonist of the story and is introduced as a mysterious and powerful medium. She is later revealed to be an incarnation of the goddess Amunet. Fallen Angels sought her out to unleash her destiny as the Mother of Evil, the harbinger of the end of days.

Unlike many of the characters in the show taken from existing fiction, Ives was created by Logan specifically for the series. The Ives character has been widely praised by critics, as has Green's performance, which earned her a Golden Globe nomination in 2016.

== Storyline ==
=== Origins ===
Vanessa Ives is the main protagonist of the story. Throughout the series, her character is given an elaborate backstory that follows her from her childhood to the beginning of the series.

Growing up in England, Vanessa was best friends with Mina Murray (Olivia Llewellyn). The two were inseparable, and despite religious differences (the Ives were devout Roman Catholic), so were their families. One evening, Vanessa spotted Mina's father, Sir Malcolm (Timothy Dalton), having sex with her own mother. Years later, a resentful Vanessa seduced Mina's fiancé, ruining their friendship.

Not long after, Vanessa fell ill. Her sickness was enigmatic, and her family was unable to help her. Unbeknownst to them, she had been possessed by the Devil. She checked herself into a mental asylum, where she befriended an orderly (Rory Kinnear) who would later die and be reanimated by Victor Frankenstein (Harry Treadaway) as an undead creature calling himself John Clare. At one point, Vanessa was visited by visions of Lucifer and his brother Dracula, but she used her own powers to scare them away. After a trepanning, she was released back into her mother's care. The surgery was unsuccessful, however, and her mother died of a heart attack after seeing Vanessa having sex with Lucifer. Not long after, Vanessa had a vision of Mina, who begged her former friend to find and save her.

Determined to find Mina, and understand her own powers, Vanessa sought out the Cut-Wife of Ballantree Moor (Patti Lupone), an infamous witch living in the moors of England. Under her tutelage, Vanessa learned about her own powers and about others who would desire them. Nightcomers in service to Lucifer, led by Evelyn Poole (Helen McCrory), schemed to separate Vanessa from the Cut-Wife, and deliver Vanessa to their master. To these ends, Evelyn seduced a lord and convinced him to arrange a mob to execute the Cut-Wife. Her plan was successful, and Vanessa watched her mentor burn, before being branded herself. She left the Moor, traumatized by what she had seen. Soon after, she sought out Sir Malcolm, and the two agreed to work together to find Mina, despite the animosity between their families.

=== Season 1 ===
Vanessa attends a Wild West show, headlined by Ethan Chandler (Josh Hartnett). She offers Ethan a job as a hired gun, which he accepts. They are unable to find Mina, but enlist Dr. Victor Frankenstein into their cause. Vanessa and Malcolm attend a party and participate in a séance, where Vanessa becomes possessed by a variety of spirits, including Mina.

As they continue their search for Mina, Vanessa pursues a romantic relationship with the enigmatic Dorian Gray (Reeve Carney). During a sexual encounter with Dorian, Vanessa becomes possessed by Lucifer once more. She begins by taunting Malcolm and Victor with their former sins, before the demon completely takes over her soul. She becomes feral and violent, and needs to be restrained. For a month, she battles the Devil inside of her, and he appears to her under many different visages. Malcolm implores Vanessa to reach out to Mina, but she is unsuccessful. Eventually, a priest comes to give a dying Vanessa her last rites, but she attacks him. In a moment of clarity, she begs Ethan to kill her. Instead, he holds a pendant of St. Jude to her forehead, and chants in Latin, begging for divine intervention. The exorcism is successful, and Vanessa collapses. When she wakes up, she claims to know where Mina is.

The group finds a horde of vampires at a theater, and fight through them. Mina reveals herself, and initially seems happy to see them. However, she quickly turns violent and attempts to bite Vanessa, claiming to be delivering her to her Master. Malcolm shoots Mina, claiming Vanessa is his only daughter. The two are distraught over Mina's death, but bond over their grief. Vanessa seeks out a priest and asks for a formal exorcism. Once the priest asks her if she truly wants to be normal, however, she apparently changes her mind and refuses.

=== Season 2 ===
Vanessa and Ethan are set upon by Nightcomers, witches in service to Lucifer. Vanessa becomes paranoid, and the group goes to great lengths to protect her. During this time, she befriends John Clare, a homeless man who she does not recognize as the reanimated orderly from her imprisonment in the Banning Clinic.

After fleeing back to Ballentree Moor, Vanessa and Ethan return to London when the leader of the Nightcomers, Evelyn Poole, takes Malcolm captive in her manor. Vanessa steals away to face the witch alone, and is confronted by a ventriloquist dummy made in her own likeness. The dummy, controlled by Lucifer, tries to convince Vanessa to join him, but she refuses and destroys it. Evelyn grows hysterical and attempts to kill Vanessa, but is intercepted by Ethan and killed.

Despite her victory, Vanessa is more lonely than ever. She offers her love to Ethan, but he refuses and turns himself in to the police. Sir Malcolm leaves to escort Sembene's remains back to Africa. Victor descends further into drug addiction. Spiraling into depression and struggling with the guilt over her own sins, Vanessa turns away from God. She takes the cross from her wall, and throws it in the fire.

=== Season 3 ===
Having spiraled into a deep depression, Vanessa is convinced to see Florence Seward (Lupone), a psychiatrist who she is shocked to find greatly resembles her late friend, the Cut-Wife. Vanessa also falls in love with Dr. Alexander Sweet (Christian Camargo), a zoologist whom she met at a museum. Upon deducing that Dr. Sweet is in fact Dracula, however, Vanessa resolves to kill him. However, upon their confrontation, Dracula asks Vanessa to join him in bringing about the Apocalypse, and promises to love her unconditionally and eternally. Cryptically responding "I accept myself" when asked if she would accept Dracula's love, she submits and allows him to bite her. With Vanessa finally becoming the Mother of Evil, darkness falls upon London and a plague spreads.

Vanessa quickly becomes disillusioned with Dracula's affections. Once Ethan and Malcolm return to London to confront her and Dracula, she begs Ethan to kill her and end the darkness that has overtaken the world. The two finally kiss and declare their love for each other. After saying the Lord's Prayer, Ethan shoots her and Vanessa dies in his arms, but not before happily declaring she can finally see God. Vanessa's death breaks Dracula's hold on London, and his plague is lifted.

She is buried in London. Malcolm and Ethan are despondent, but find solace knowing that Vanessa finally found peace in death. John Clare, who Vanessa had briefly befriended, watches her funeral and weeps at her grave.

== Creation and casting ==
Unlike many of the characters in the show taken from existing fiction, Vanessa Ives was created by writer John Logan specifically for the series. According to Logan, "This is a show about Vanessa Ives and her struggle with faith—how one woman grapples with God and the devil." Logan's decision to kill Vanessa was highly controversial. When asked why, he explained, "Because she's a character desperately in need of peace, and the mortal realm was not going to give it to her."

The Mother of Evil, the all-powerful demon capable of destroying mankind, was also created specifically for the series by Logan. She is described as a prophesied god-like being capable of freeing Lucifer or Dracula, and overthrowing Heaven at their side. There is no such character in Biblical lore, although the Mother appears to have some similarities to the Whore of Babylon. Additionally, throughout the series, the Mother is called by several other names, such as Amunet, Lilith, and Hela. All of these women exist in different religious mythologies, but they do not all serve the same purpose as in the series. Logan took creative liberties in creating an entirely original character from different established religious sources.

== Reception ==
The character of Vanessa Ives quickly became a favorite amongst viewers and critics. When comparing her to the host of pre-existing characters populating the series, BuzzFeed notes, "it's all the more impressive that Vanessa, an original creation, is the standout character", and later writes, "It's not Vanessa's ambiguous powers that make her interesting, but rather her all-too-human vulnerabilities." Nerdist praises Vanessa as "a woman simply not meant for corsets and archaic morality". Salon commended the character, writing, "The coup de grace, of course, was Vanessa Ives. Courted by the devil from outside and haunted by the devil within, she was the series' unabashed icon. Anchored by a tour de force performance by Eva Green, Vanessa hides almost endless complexity."

Eva Green's performance received widespread acclaim. Speaking of her performance in the first-season episode "Séance", IndieWire writes, "The way she contorts not just her body – in gruesome, if not traditional movements – but her lips, as they spit out vile voices not her own, is positively haunting." The A.V. Club describes Green as "a fearless actress who has no time for pedestrian concerns about vanity or what some might consider to be over the top". Praising the episode "A Blade of Grass", from the third season, Den of Geek writes, "The Vanessa episodes are most often the strongest in their respective seasons, mostly because they serve to showcase Green's complete embodiment of the character." Eric Diaz of Nerdist, reflecting upon the end of the series, wrote, "Eva Green as Vanessa Ives was really a Master Class in acting, and hopefully someone will give her a damn Emmy this time."

In 2016, Eva Green was nominated for Golden Globe Award for Best Performance by an Actress in a Television Series – Drama.

== See also ==
- Brides of Dracula
- Gothic fiction
