= Bride of Frankenstein (character) =

Fictional character

- Frankenstein character
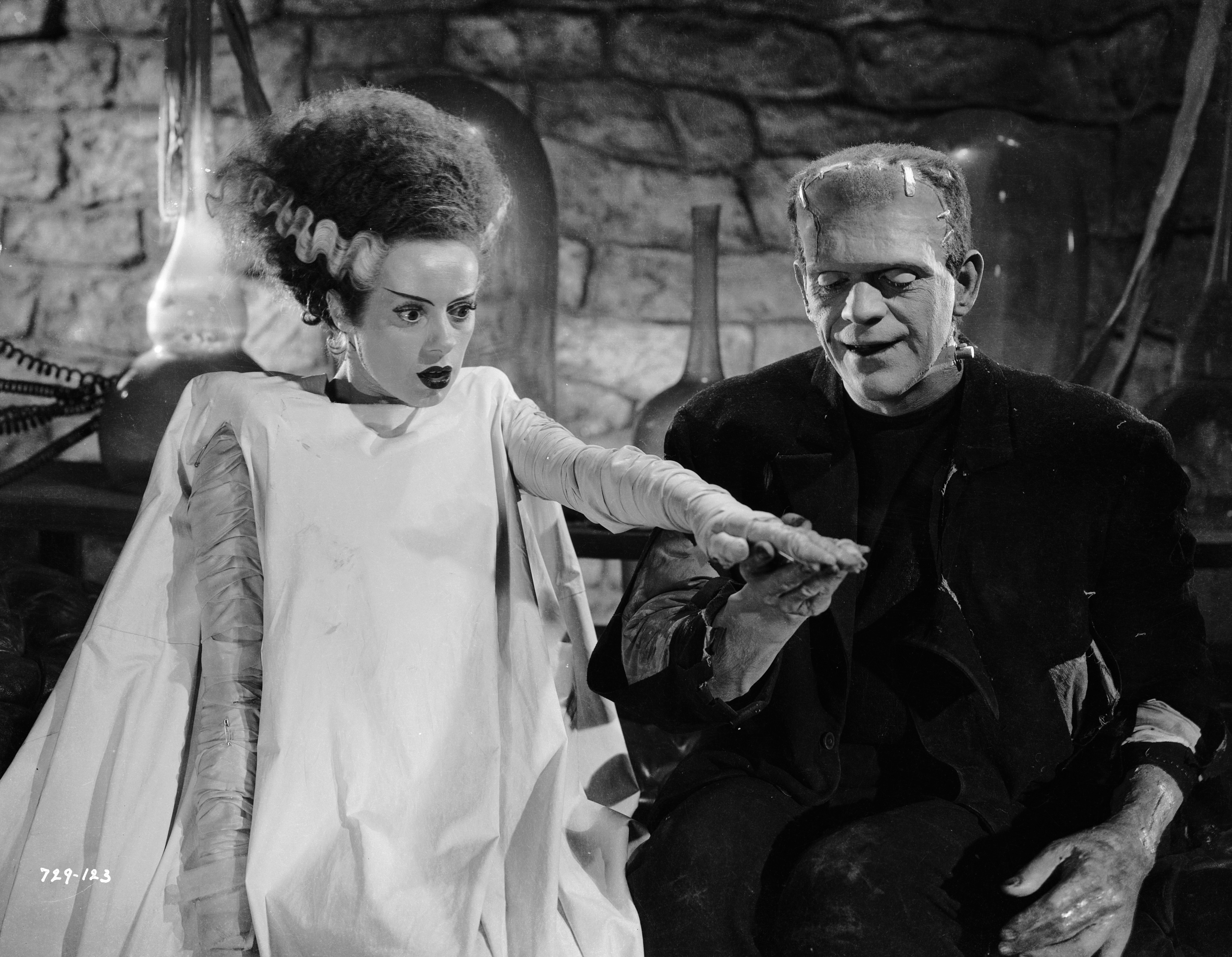
- Elsa Lanchester as the Monster's Bride with Boris Karloff as the Monster in Bride of Frankenstein
- Created by: Mary Shelley
- Adapted by: William Hurlbut
- Portrayed by: Elsa Lanchester

In-universe information
- Species: Simulacrum human
- Family: Victor Frankenstein (creator, novel); Heinrich "Henry" von Frankenstein (creator, film); Septimus Pretorius (creator, film); Frankenstein's monster (companion/predecessor)

The Bride of Frankenstein is the colloquial name for a fictional character first introduced in Mary Shelley's 1818 novel Frankenstein; or, The Modern Prometheus and later in the 1935 film Bride of Frankenstein. In the film, the Bride is played by Elsa Lanchester. The character's design in the film features a conical hairdo with white lightning-trace streaks on each side, which has become an iconic symbol of both the character and the film.

== History ==
=== Novel ===
In Mary Shelley's Frankenstein or the Modern Prometheus, Victor Frankenstein is tempted by his monster's proposal to create a female creature so that the monster can have a wife: "'Shall each man,' cried he, 'find a wife for his bosom, and each beast have his mate, and I be alone?'" The monster promises that if Victor grants his request, he and his mate will vanish into the wilderness of South America, never to reappear. Fearing for his family, Victor reluctantly agrees and travels to the Orkney Islands to begin his work on the creature's mate. He is plagued by premonitions of what his work might wreak, particularly the idea that creating a bride for the monster might lead to the breeding of an entire race of creatures that could plague mankind. After seeing his first creation looking in the window, Frankenstein destroys the unfinished bride. The monster witnesses this, fails to get Victor to put it back together, and vows to be with Victor on his upcoming wedding night. True to his word, the monster murders Frankenstein's new wife Elizabeth.

=== Film ===
Elsa Lanchester plays an incarnation of the female monster in Bride of Frankenstein (1935). Unlike in the novel, Henry Frankenstein (Colin Clive) is coerced into creating a mate for the monster (Boris Karloff) by his old mentor Doctor Septimus Pretorius, who artificially grows her brain. She appears only briefly in the film's conclusion, wherein she is brought to life in a similar process to the monster. Frankenstein's monster attempts to bond with her, but she is frightened of him. In despair, the monster deliberately destroys the tower, along with the bride and Pretorius. Though the monster is known to have survived in Son of Frankenstein (1939), the bride is believed to have died in the explosion.

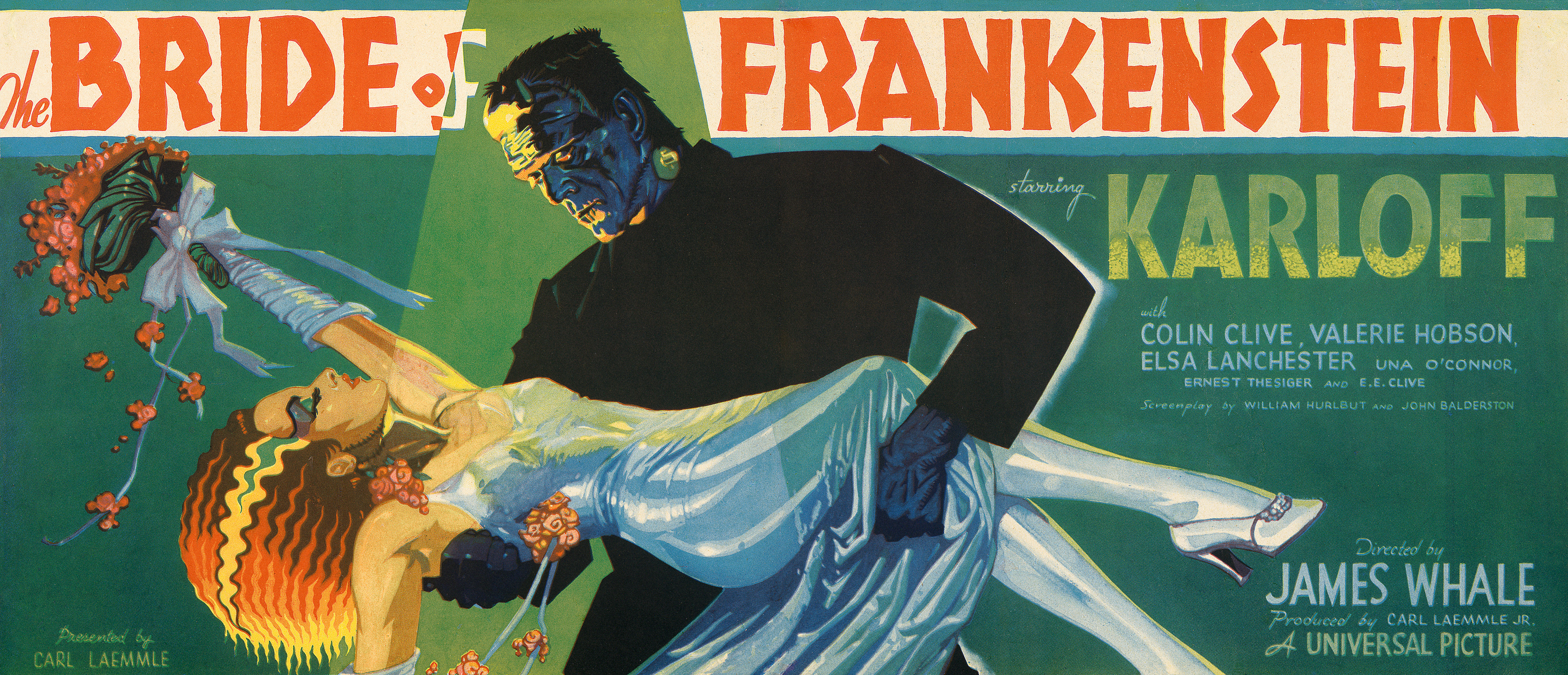
1930s Universal's art director Karoly Grosz designed this offbeat 1935 advertisement

==== Production info ====
Early in production, James Whale decided that the same actress cast to play the Bride should also play Mary Shelley in the film's prologue, to represent how the story — and horror in general — springs from the dark side of the imagination. He considered Brigitte Helm and Phyllis Brooks before deciding on Elsa Lanchester. Lanchester, who had accompanied husband Charles Laughton to Hollywood, had met with only moderate success at that point. Lanchester had returned alone to London when Whale contacted her to offer her the dual role. Lanchester modeled the Bride's hissing on the hissing of swans. She gave herself a sore throat while filming the hissing sequence, which Whale shot from multiple angles.

=== The Bride (1985 film) ===
The Bride of Frankenstein was portrayed as Eva in The Bride played by Jennifer Beals, opposite of Clancy Brown as the monster Viktor. She was created by Baron Charles Frankenstein and his assistant Paulus. When she sees Viktor, she is revolted. Later on in the film, Eva falls in love with Viktor when he discovers her in the monastery outside of Frankenstein's castle.

=== Mary Shelley's Frankenstein (1994 film) ===
A version of the character appears in the 1994 film Mary Shelley's Frankenstein, played by Helena Bonham Carter. In this version, Victor attempts to revive his wife Elizabeth after she is killed by the Monster by placing her head on the intact body of his hanged servant Justine. He succeeds, but the Monster interrupts their reunion claiming Elizabeth as his own Bride. The transformed and apparently amnesic Elizabeth feels drawn to the Monster and caresses his face. After realizing she has the same scars as he, she understands what Victor did to her. Victor and the Monster fight for Elizabeth, but she feels disgusted with herself. She rejects both men with guttural cries and commits suicide by setting herself on fire.

=== The Bride! (2026 film) ===
In The Bride!, Jessie Buckley portrays Mary Shelley's ghost who tells the viewer there is another story that she did not have the opportunity to tell in life. Shelley then possesses a woman named Ida (also played by Buckley) in 1936 Chicago, who is killed by the mob. The monster, nicknamed "Frank" and portrayed by Christian Bale, approaches scientist Dr. Cornelia Euphronius and asks her to create a companion. They exhume Ida's body and Dr. Euphronius animates her. She has no memory of her past life. After a violent altercation outside a dance club, the two find themselves on the run from police and the mob members who thought Ida was dead. Frank is shot and killed at a drive-in theater. The Bride takes him back to Dr. Euphronius only to be shot dead by police. Possessed by Shelley's ghost, Dr. Euphronius decides to revive them both as they hold hands.

== In other media ==
Since the original film, characters based on the Bride of Frankenstein have been featured in different media. Unlike the original, most of these later incarnations of the Bride depict her as reciprocating the Monster's affection for her:

- The Bride of Frankenstein appears as "The Monster's Mate" in the 1967 film Mad Monster Party? voiced by Phyllis Diller (whose likeness was used for the Bride's design). She was seen with Frankenstein's Monster (who she calls "Fang", the name Diller used for her husband in her comedy act) where they live with their creator Baron Boris von Frankenstein on the Isle of Evil.
- The Bride of Frankenstein appears in the 1972 film Mad Mad Mad Monsters (a "prequel of sorts" to Mad Monster Party) voiced by Rhoda Mann. This version is shown with hair over her face, with her face not being seen until the end of the film. She was created by Baron Henry von Frankenstein to be the mate for his monster. Henry's assistant Igor wants the Bride for himself as Henry is planning to have a wedding at the Transylvania Astoria Hotel on Friday the 13th.
- The Bride of Frankenstein appears in the 1973 British television film Frankenstein: The True Story portrayed by Jane Seymour. This incarnation of the Bride, named Prima, is created using the head of a peasant girl named Agatha and a body grown by Dr. Polidori using a chemical process. Polidori intends to use the bride as his introduction to high society and ultimately to gain political influence. This is initially successful, and Prima becomes socially prominent. Elizabeth Frankenstein discovers that Prima hides a hideous surgical scar around her neck with a choker, and realizes Prima is a reanimated corpse. Prima rejects the male creature, who kills her by tearing off her head.
- In the 1974 film Young Frankenstein, Elizabeth (Madeline Kahn) styles her hair in homage to the Bride at the end where she is now married to the Monster.
- The Bride of Frankenstein appears in the Looney Tunes 1988 animated short The Night of the Living Duck. She is seen in Daffy Duck's dream amongst the monsters in the nightclub that Daffy is in and accompanied by Frankenstein's monster. When Daffy asks Frankenstein's monster how the "Mrs." is doing, the Bride hisses at Daffy.
- In the 1988 animated film Scooby-Doo! and the Reluctant Werewolf, the Bride of Frankenstein is featured. She is named Repulsa and voiced by B.J. Ward.
- In the 1990 animated series Gravedale High, the character Miss Dirge (voiced by Eileen Brennan) is based on the Bride of Frankenstein.
- The Bride of Frankenstein is one of six monsters featured in the 1998 pinball machine Monster Bash by Williams. The objective of the game is to form a band with classic Universal monsters. Every monster has their own game mode which you have to start to have them added as a band member, the Bride is the singer in the band. With this iteration of the Bride, she was created before the Monster and she has requested Dr. Frankenstein to create the perfect husband for her. In her game mode, she attacks the monster with kitchen appliances after being disappointed by the doctor's work.
- The Bride of Frankenstein appears in the Johnny Bravo episode "Frankenbravo" voiced by Candi Milo. She is referred to as Bride of F and was created by the mad scientist Dr. F.
- The Bride of Frankenstein appears in The Grim Adventures of Billy & Mandy voiced by Jane Carr. She is shown as an inhabitant of the Home of the Ancients retirement home, where she is friends with Dracula and Wolfman.
- The Bride of Frankenstein appears in 2005–06 in DC Comics' Seven Soldiers: Frankenstein and in subsequent stories featuring that version of the Creature (who calls himself Frankenstein).
- The Bride appears in the 2010-12 Adult Swim series Mary Shelley's Frankenhole. Originally created as a companion to Victor Frankenstein's cynical and alcoholic "Creation", she is so disdainful of him that she went as far as to have her hair replaced with fire to keep him away. The Bride is in a relationship with a vampiric Mohandas Gandhi.
- The Bride of Frankenstein appears as Eunice in the Hotel Transylvania franchise, voiced by Fran Drescher. She is portrayed as Frankenstein's wife, the best friend of Wanda the Werewolf, and also as the aunt of Dracula's daughter Mavis. She is a diva, dressed in a black miniskirt and fluffy pink turtleneck jumper.
- The novel series The Extraordinary Adventures of the Athena Club, beginning with The Strange Case of the Alchemist's Daughter, features the daughters of various Victorian scientists coming together to oppose their fathers. The Bride is one of these; here she is Justine Frankenstein, created using the body of the maid Justine who was framed and killed for the creature's crimes, but despite the name she has no memory of her previous life.
- In the Showtime TV series Penny Dreadful, the Bride appears as Brona Croft (portrayed by Billie Piper), an Irish immigrant with a dark past who dies of tuberculosis at the end of Season 1. In season 2, she is brought back to life with no memory after Frankenstein's monster demands a bride and given the new name "Lily Frankenstein" by Victor (who passes her off as his cousin). It is later revealed that she knew Victor was her creator from the very beginning which she reveals to the monster after stating that they will bring about a new age of immortals. A brief romantic involvement with the immortal Dorian Gray peters out as he had no ambition for global domination.
- The Bride of Frankenstein appears in the Vampirina episode "Franken-Wedding," voiced by Anna Camp opposite of Skylar Astin as Frankenstein. The two of them hold their wedding at the Scare B&B.
- A modern take on the character was added as a purchasable cosmetic outfit in Fortnite as part of the official Universal Movie Monsters collaboration.
- A planned reboot of the classic Universal Monsters was to have them in a shared universe, to be known as the Dark Universe, and was to include a remake of The Bride of Frankenstein, with early reports indicating Angelina Jolie under consideration for the lead. However, the first Dark Universe film The Mummy flopped at the box office, ending plans for any more such films.
- In the Dark Horse "Universal's Monsters" novel The Bride of Frankenstein: Pandora's Bride, Pretorius and the Bride survive the explosion. They escape to Germany where he teaches her to become her own woman.
