= Blade of grass sign =

Radiologic sign

The blade of grass sign (also known as the flame sign) is a radiologic sign referring to the lytic fronts seen in the leading edge of the long bone in Paget's disease. It is usually seen as a wedge shaped area of radiolucency in the diaphysis of long bone.
