= List of Penny Dreadful episodes =

Penny Dreadful is a British-American horror drama television series created and written by John Logan, who serves as executive producer alongside Sam Mendes. The title refers to the penny dreadfuls, a type of 19th-century cheap British fiction publication with lurid and sensational subject matter. The series premiered on Showtime on May 11, 2014. After the third-season finale on June 19, 2016, series creator John Logan announced that Penny Dreadful had ended. During the course of the series, 27 episodes of Penny Dreadful aired over three seasons.

The series draws upon many public domain characters from 19th-century British and Irish fiction, including Dorian Gray from Oscar Wilde's The Picture of Dorian Gray; Mina Harker, Abraham Van Helsing, Dr. Seward, Renfield, and Count Dracula from Bram Stoker's Dracula; Victor Frankenstein and his creature from Mary Shelley's Frankenstein; and Dr. Henry Jekyll from Robert Louis Stevenson's Strange Case of Dr Jekyll and Mr Hyde.

== Series overview ==
Season	Episodes	Originally released	
Season	Episodes	First released	Last released
1	8	May 11, 2014	June 29, 2014
2	10	May 3, 2015	July 5, 2015
3	9	May 1, 2016	June 19, 2016

== Episodes ==
=== Season 1 (2014) ===
No. overall	No. in season	Title	Directed by	Written by	Original release date	US viewers (millions)
1	1	"Night Work"	J. A. Bayona	John Logan	May 11, 2014	0.872
In Victorian England on September 22, 1891, a woman and her daughter are brutally abducted and later found mutilated and dismembered. Meanwhile, the enigmatic Vanessa Ives enlists the skilled marksman/showman Ethan Chandler to do some "night work". She introduces him to Sir Malcolm Murray, father of the recently-abducted Mina Harker. The trio infiltrate a vampire nest in search of Mina. They find and kill a vicious vampire, later enlisting Victor Frankenstein to examine it. The autopsy reveals hieroglyphs etched beneath its skin, which are later found to be from the Egyptian Book of the Dead. Ethan, overwhelmed by the new world opening before him, takes his payment and leaves Vanessa and Sir Malcolm's service, but is later tempted to return. In his laboratory, Frankenstein brings life to a dead body.
2	2	"Séance"	J. A. Bayona	John Logan	May 18, 2014	0.722
Sir Malcolm offers his assistance with the "Ripper" case, proclaiming that they should be looking for a beast, not a man. Ethan befriends Brona Croft, a sickly prostitute, who later has an erotic encounter with the seductive and charming Dorian Gray. Vanessa and Sir Malcolm attend Ferdinand Lyle's party. There, Vanessa meets Dorian, and the two are deeply drawn to one another. The guests take part in a séance led by a spiritualist known as Madame Kali, where Vanessa is possessed by an evil entity, who accuses Sir Malcolm of leaving his son to die. The next day, Ferdinand studies the other photographed hieroglyphics and discovers that they are a resurrection spell invoking Amunet and Amun-Ra, who will bring about the apocalypse if united. He concludes that Vanessa is being hunted by them. Victor's newly animated creation chooses a name – Proteus. They become close friends, but their time together is cut short when Proteus is murdered by Victor's "firstborn", Caliban, an earlier creation.
3	3	"Resurrection"	Dearbhla Walsh	John Logan	May 25, 2014	0.734
Victor is forced to listen to the story of his first creation. Caliban was abandoned by Victor after he was created, and wandered the streets until an actor took pity on him and gave him a job in the Grand Guignol theatre. Lonely, the creature demands that Victor make him a mate. Ethan joins Vanessa and Sir Malcolm's company once again. Vanessa's visions of Mina lead the group to the London Zoo, where they encounter and capture Fenton, a vampire thrall. Sir Malcolm reveals his suspicion that Mina is being used as bait to lure a greater prize, to wit, Vanessa.
4	4	"Demimonde"	Dearbhla Walsh	John Logan	June 1, 2014	0.730
Vanessa grows increasingly infatuated with Dorian. Victor and Professor Van Helsing study Fenton's blood, hoping to manufacture a cure. Sir Malcolm and Victor come face to face with a vampire; Fenton is killed in the ensuing conflict. Concluding that Fenton had allowed himself to be captured, Sir Malcolm and Vanessa discuss the probability that Mina is too far gone to save. Unnerved at seeing Ethan so comfortable around Dorian and Vanessa, Brona ends her relationship with him, citing her terminal illness. Heartbroken, Ethan drowns his sorrows with Dorian, culminating in a sexual encounter.
5	5	"Closer Than Sisters"	Coky Giedroyc	John Logan	June 8, 2014	0.797
Vanessa, through a letter to Mina, relates their backstory. The Ives and Murray families were neighbours and friends, to the point where Vanessa and Mina were considered as close as sisters, and it was accepted as a foregone conclusion that Vanessa would marry Mina's frail brother, Peter. As a young girl, Vanessa caught Sir Malcolm and her mother having an affair. Although she kept it a secret, she says the experience led her to embrace her dark side, culminating in seducing Mina's fiancé the night before their wedding. The families severed ties after this, the strain of which caused Vanessa's clairvoyance and mediumship to manifest. She was committed to an asylum, an experience which left her mostly catatonic. Vanessa recovered with the assistance of an evil spirit that took Sir Malcolm's form. Some time later, Vanessa encountered Mina, who forgave her for her transgression, but revealed that she had already been kidnapped by the master vampire. This inspired Vanessa to seek out Sir Malcolm and begin their search.
6	6	"What Death Can Join Together"	Coky Giedroyc	John Logan	June 15, 2014	0.681
Sir Malcolm, Ethan and Sembene track the vampires to a quarantined ship and learn that Mina is closer than they thought. Not trusting Vanessa, Sir Malcolm encourages her to spend the evening with Dorian. During sexual intercourse with Dorian, Vanessa hears a dark voice greeting her, causing her to leave in a hurry. Brona reconciles with Ethan, but her condition worsens. Van Helsing attempts to pass on to Frankenstein what he knows of vampires, but is murdered by Caliban, who intends to continue killing those close to his creator until his mate is made. As Vanessa arrives home, she supernaturally levitates off the ground.
7	7	"Possession"	James Hawes	John Logan	June 22, 2014	0.799
Vanessa's evening with Dorian allows a demon to possess her. Sir Malcolm engages the help of Ethan, Victor and Sembene to restrain her, but her condition worsens as time passes. Sir Malcolm, having hoped that Vanessa could contact Mina while under the influence of the possession, finally allows a Catholic priest into the house to administer last rites, but when Vanessa attacks the priest as he begins, Ethan manages to perform an exorcism on Vanessa by himself. Vanessa collapses, but emerges from her room later. She informs Sir Malcolm that she now knows where Mina is.
8	8	"Grand Guignol"	James Hawes	John Logan	June 29, 2014	0.856
Vanessa rejects Dorian's further advances, noting that he is not good for her. Caliban's first love ends poorly, and he is forced to leave the theatre, returning to Victor's lodgings. Victor initially tries to kill his creation, but takes pity on him instead. Brona's consumption nears its end. Unbeknownst to Ethan, Victor smothers her and uses her body to create a mate for Caliban. When Sir Malcolm's team find Mina in the Grand Guignol theatre, she captures Vanessa, intending to make her her master's bride. Sir Malcolm kills Mina to save Vanessa. While mourning over Brona's death, Ethan is approached by two Pinkerton detectives determined to return him to America and to his father. He transforms into a werewolf and attacks them. Vanessa requests an exorcism from a priest, who asks her if she truly wants to be normal.

=== Season 2 (2015) ===
No. overall	No. in season	Title	Directed by	Written by	Original release date	US viewers (millions)
9	1	"Fresh Hell"	James Hawes	John Logan	April 19, 2015 (online); May 3, 2015 (Showtime)	0.575
Vanessa is barraged by an onslaught of disturbing occult images brought on by the mysterious Evelyn Poole. Following the massacre in the Mariner's Inn, Ethan believes he needs to leave London. Dr. Frankenstein works to bring Brona back to life while under pressure from Caliban, who, in search of work after being let go at the Grand Guignol, applies at a wax museum. After Mina's funeral, Sir Malcolm returns to London to discover that a new evil is hunting Vanessa.
10	2	"Verbis Diablo"	James Hawes	John Logan	May 10, 2015	0.536
A distressed Vanessa looks for comfort from Sir Malcolm, who takes her to an underground care facility for people suffering from cholera. Vanessa begins to work as a volunteer there. Dr. Frankenstein begins his work with Brona, now known as Lily. A Scotland Yard inspector tracks down the sole survivor of the Mariner's Inn Massacre. Evelyn begins her manipulation of Sir Malcolm. Dorian Gray meets Angelique, a mysterious and glamorous beauty. Ferdinand Lyle reveals the secrets of the Verbis Diablo. Hecate Poole murders a family and takes their infant. Ferdinand is revealed to be blackmailed by Evelyn and her coven into spying on the group, before Hecate returns with a bag containing the lifeless body of the infant. Evelyn takes the bag into a chamber room filled with voodoo dolls. She removes the organs of the infant and sews them into a lifelike doll of Vanessa.
11	3	"The Nightcomers"	Brian Kirk	John Logan	May 17, 2015	0.639
A young Vanessa harnesses her fledgling powers as a witch from the Cut-Wife (real name Joan Clayton), a trainer and master of the dark arts, but as she sees the extent of Vanessa's powers, the Cut-Wife warns her of the dangers that lie ahead and the evil that will chase her until the end of her days.
12	4	"Evil Spirits in Heavenly Places"	Damon Thomas	John Logan	May 24, 2015	0.640
Lyle divulges how the grim and disconcerting history behind the Verbis Diablo relics affects Vanessa; Inspector Bartholomew Rusk speaks with a survivor of the Mariner's Inn Massacre; Hecate does her best to get close to Ethan. However, during their meeting in a cafe, Ethan reveals Hecate's ruse and believes she is an agent of his father's. Vanessa assists Victor in buying clothes for Lily. As Lily tries to become more ladylike, the relationship between her and Victor develops. At night, after being told that her future is potentially linked to the devil, Vanessa is attacked by the witches who take a lock of her hair.
13	5	"Above the Vaulted Sky"	Damon Thomas	John Logan	May 31, 2015	0.712
Vanessa, Ethan, Sembene, and Sir Malcolm strive to work together as a team to defend the old mansion from another attack; Caliban becomes increasingly impatient with Frankenstein; Hecate returns from her travels with a gift for her mother. Vanessa meets Lily, and is able to detect the look of love between Frankenstein and Lily. Caliban and Vanessa recite poetry together and Vanessa teaches him to dance. Ethan is questioned by Rusk, indicating that he is suspicious of Ethan's background. Gladys Murray continues to be tormented by Poole's fetish-voodoo doll. As the night turns stormy, she sees the ghosts of her children and takes her own life. Evelyn and Sir Malcolm become intimate, as she uses her ring to enchant him. Angelique reveals more of her story to Dorian after a disastrous night at the opera.
14	6	"Glorious Horrors"	James Hawes	John Logan	June 7, 2015	0.566
Sir Malcolm returns home to learn the fate of his wife, but is seemingly unaffected by the news. Victor realizes that Vanessa has met the Creature and is visibly affected. Dorian throws a ball to introduce Angelique to high society. However, the evening turns into a scarring experience for Vanessa, who is forced to attend without an escort after Ethan rejects her invitation. At the ball, Lily senses she knows Dorian's room of portraits and Dorian himself. Victor is troubled by the attraction between Dorian and Lily, and angrily chastises her. Malcolm brings Evelyn to the ball, after shaving off his beard, seemingly enchanted by Evelyn's charms. Vanessa expresses her concern and disapproval to Evelyn about Sir Malcolm's changes in character, as well as their developing relationship. While being observed by the witches and preparing to leave, Vanessa begins to have visions of blood rain in the ballroom and faints. Lavinia Putney is troubled after an encounter with Caliban, telling her parents that something is amiss. As the night is of a full moon, Ethan asks to be chained up in the basement and watched by Sembene. Ethan turns into a werewolf.
15	7	"Little Scorpion"	Brian Kirk	John Logan	June 14, 2015	0.572
The following morning, Vanessa and Ethan retreat to the Cut-Wife's cottage, where a figure from her past resurfaces. On the first night, Ethan leaves as the full moon rises, causing him to change and attack sheep. Vanessa awakens to Ethan cutting down the tree where the Cut-Wife was murdered. The pair spend their time gardening, target practice, cooking, and dancing. During a thunderstorm, lightning strikes the roof and a fire starts. They extinguish it together. Exhilarated, they kiss, but she eventually pulls away, acknowledging the danger in their intimacy. They are then threatened by Sir Geoffrey, the man responsible for the Cut-Wife's murder. This prompts Vanessa to recite from the Verbis Diablo which leads to Sir Geoffrey's death. Ethan confronts Vanessa, fearing that she has lost her soul. Interpreting the relics about a relationship between Amunet and Amun-Ra, gods who believed in their immortality and love but would be dangerous if ever joined, Lyle indicates there is a cycle involving Vanessa: the Demon, the Scorpion and the Hound. Meanwhile, Lily meets a man at a bar, has sex with him and then strangles to death.
16	8	"Memento Mori"	Kari Skogland	John Logan	June 21, 2015	0.523
Malcolm is visited by Inspector Rusk, making the connection between him and Ethan. By remembering the events from the year before, Malcolm's connection to Evelyn begins to falter. Using the voodoo doll, Evelyn attempts to hurt Malcolm; however, Sembene helps break the spell. Malcolm begins to have visions of everyone important to him, and Evelyn fails to maintain her power over him. Malcolm visits Evelyn, who promises him eternal life and companionship if Vanessa is given to her Master. He rejects her offer, and she traps him in a room with the coffin of his departed son. While holding the body, a distraught Malcolm is haunted by the ghosts of his wife and Mina. Dorian returns home to find that Angelique has discovered his secret room. They stand before the portrait, as he asks if she can love him. Despite Angelique declaring her love for him, Dorian kills her, while looking upon the painting of an older man wrapped in chains. Caliban confronts Lily, who is able to hurt him. She reveals her possession of Brona's memories and declares her independence from the submission of man. Lily seduces Caliban, revealing her plan to murder Victor.
17	9	"And Hell Itself My Only Foe"	Brian Kirk	John Logan	June 28, 2015	0.604
Still hiding in the Cut Wife's cottage, Vanessa and Ethan are discovered by Roper, the bounty hunter that Ethan mauled. Vanessa stabs him to death and they bury the body. Victor arrives to inform them of Malcolm's situation and they return home. Victor's addiction to narcotics worsens. Meanwhile, the Putneys trap Caliban in a cell, planning to display him as a "freak" in their new business venture. The ghosts of Malcolm's family keep torturing him. Lyle admits his involvement in the situation as they plan, but Ethan discourages Vanessa from attempting a rescue at night, when he will change into the wolf. Sembene reveals he used to be a slave trader. Hecate appears in Ethan's room and asks to ally with him. Vanessa sneaks out of the mansion to fight Evelyn alone. Sembene, Lyle, Victor, and Ethan follow. Ethan and Sembene are trapped together. Sembene refuses to kill Ethan to save himself, saying the Lupus Dei is of more value than an ordinary man. Ethan changes and reluctantly kills Sembene. Victor becomes trapped with a tormented Malcolm and is forced to face Caliban. Lily and Dorian become intimate and agree to become partners in her plan for the future.
18	10	"And They Were Enemies"	Brian Kirk	John Logan	July 5, 2015	0.746
Vanessa faces the Master/Devil in the form of a puppet of herself, who promises her a normal life with Ethan and a family, if she chooses to give him her soul. Meanwhile, Malcolm and Victor continue to be tormented by the ghosts of their life, who demand their deaths. Vanessa manages to resist the Master's promises, beginning to recite words from the Verbis Diablo. The words destroy the puppet, and scorpions scramble from the head. As Evelyn begins to age, Hecate releases Ethan from the stairwell. Ethan kills Evelyn, but before he can kill Vanessa, he seems to recognize her and runs away. Upon Evelyn's death, the spell is broken and Victor and Malcolm are released from the ghosts. Caliban escapes his confinement and kills the Putneys, sparing Lavinia. Victor confronts Dorian and Lily, shooting them both. Unaffected, they mock Victor, and Lily reveals that she has always known how she was made and is disgusted by him. In his guilt, Ethan turns himself over to Rusk for the murders committed at the Mariner's Inn hoping for a swift execution, but is instead extradited to America.

=== Season 3 (2016) ===
No. overall	No. in season	Title	Directed by	Written by	Original release date	US viewers (millions)
19	1	"The Day Tennyson Died"	Damon Thomas	John Logan	April 24, 2016 (online); May 1, 2016 (Showtime)	0.540
As London grieves the death of "the last great poet" Alfred Tennyson, all the characters are scattered around the world. A distraught Vanessa fights a severe depression with the help of an alienist; Victor Frankenstein seeks redemption with the aid of an old classmate, Dr. Henry Jekyll; Sir Malcolm meets a mysterious man in Zanzibar; Ethan Chandler is escorted home to his father, with Hecate in tow; and the Creature stranded in the Arctic sets off on a journey after his past memories re-appear. Meanwhile, a new threat hangs over London in the form of Count Dracula.
20	2	"Predators Far and Near"	Damon Thomas	John Logan	May 8, 2016	0.554
Dorian and Lily rescue a girl named Justine from a torture house. Rusk refuses to hand the matter of Ethan's execution to the Americans due to his snatching. Vanessa begins her regular sessions with Dr. Seward; Renfield begins gathering information for his new master. Jekyll shows Frankenstein his lab. They agree to test on a subject before attempting anything on Lily. Sir Malcolm and Kaetenay embark on a ship to the American West to rescue Ethan. After a session, Vanessa attends a lecture given by Dr. Sweet and later invites him to accompany her for a night out. Lily promises Justine that she will have revenge against those who hurt her. Frankenstein and Jekyll test on their subject, which is successful. Ethan transforms and murders his escorts with the help of Hecate. Frankenstein has a tender moment with Lily, who advises him not to see her again. Renfield visits his master's lair with the information; Dr. Sweet is revealed to be Dracula.
21	3	"Good and Evil Braided Be"	Damon Thomas	John Logan	May 15, 2016	0.599
The Creature returns to London in search of his former family. Sir Malcolm and Kaetenay continue to track Ethan and Hecate, as does Rusk, with the assistance of Franklin Orstow and his deputies. Dorian and Lily continue their tutelage of Justine in the acquisition of power. As Vanessa continually struggles with the mysterious forces tracking her every move, the beleaguered witch meets a creature of the night who divulges details and clues to her past and says that she has met his master before, hinting it was in the clinic where she spent five months.
22	4	"A Blade of Grass"	Toa Fraser	John Logan	May 22, 2016	0.482
In order to better understand the plight that she has been given to deal with, Vanessa convinces Dr. Seward to hypnotise her so that she may relive her time in the clinic and remember her meeting with the master. In doing so, she discovers that the only person she ever saw in her room at the clinic was "John Clare".
23	5	"This World Is Our Hell"	Paco Cabezas	Andrew Hinderaker	May 29, 2016	0.656
Ethan, Hecate, Sir Malcolm, Kaetenay, Rusk and the rangers continue the trek across the western landscape. Frankenstein and Jekyll test their modified serum on their subject with miraculous results. Hecate encourages Ethan to embrace his dark side, and they become closer. With Ethan's agreement, she summons rattlesnakes to kill the rangers; Rusk and Ostow survive although Kaetenay is bitten. Ethan appears to gradually accept his darkness, and makes love to Hecate. In the desert, Ethan's horse collapses from heat and thirst, then Hecate's, forcing them to continue on foot. Hecate collapses and is barely alive when Sir Malcolm arrives with a very weak Kaetenay. Sir Malcolm attempts to kill Hecate, but Ethan saves her. Riders summoned by his father, Jared Talbot, arrive and take them to the household, leaving Kaetenay to die at the request of Ethan; Sir Malcolm is unhappy with this. Talbot requests his assistance in dealing with Ethan. He shows Ethan the room where their family died at the hands of Apache warriors, saying that he will pay for his hand in the raid. He aims his pistol at his son, demanding he repent on pain of death and damnation.
24	6	"No Beast So Fierce"	Paco Cabezas	Andrew Hinderaker & Krysty Wilson-Cairns	June 5, 2016	0.722
Rusk and Ostow arrive at the household and place everyone present under arrest. Lyle embarks on an indefinite trip to Cairo. Frankenstein perfects the serum. The Creature comforts his dying son, until the latter opens his eyes and is horrified by the Creature, who leaves, distraught. Catriona Hartdegen agrees to help Vanessa defeat Dracula. Vanessa then visits Dr. Sweet, whom she eventually has sex with. Frankenstein sneaks into Dorian and Lily's house to kidnap her and bring her to the lab for experimentation, but her army catches him. Lily spares Frankenstein's life, saying that she is in no need of curing, but he could still be of use. Dorian lets Frankenstein out, telling the doctor that he is now in his debt. At the Talbot household, Ostow says his men were murdered at the hands of Jared's men, and that there will be a reckoning. Jared shoots him dead. A battle ensues, with Rusk and Hecate killed. Kaetenay is revealed to be alive, on good terms with Ethan. In the shooutout, Ethan refuses to kill Jared, who tries to provoke him into doing it. He is about to pronounce a curse on Ethan when Sir Malcolm shoots him dead.
25	7	"Ebb Tide"	Paco Cabezas	John Logan	June 12, 2016	0.651
Kaetenay has visions of Vanessa in danger, which prompts Sir Malcolm and Ethan to travel back to London. The Creature returns to his wife and son, on the advice of Vanessa. Lily sends her assembled army of women out to kill, which disturbs Dorian. Catriona Hartdegen helps Vanessa discover that Dracula's human identity is Dr Sweet and tells her he can be killed when in human form. Dorian delivers Lily to Victor so that he can administer the serum he and Jekyll have made. Vanessa confronts Sweet at the museum but he convinces her to join him, and she lets him bite her.
26	8	"Perpetual Night"	Damon Thomas	Krysty Wilson-Cairns	June 19, 2016	0.448
Sir Malcolm, Ethan and Kaetenay arrive in London to find the streets deserted and falling under the influence of darkness. Catriona helps save them when they are attacked by vampires at Sir Malcolm's home. She tells them that the end of days is coming and that Vanessa is the only one who can stop it. Dorian dismisses Lily's army and then kills Justine. Lily reveals a secret from her past to Victor, who releases her without administering the serum. Dr. Seward discovers Renfield is working for Dracula. Ethan is attacked by vampires and Kaetenay reveals he is a werewolf.
27	9	"The Blessed Dark"	Paco Cabezas	John Logan	June 19, 2016	0.551
Dracula reveals to Vanessa that Ethan is prophesied as his only threat. Dr. Seward discovers from Renfield the location of Dracula's lair. Lily leaves Dorian. The Creature's son dies and his wife urges him to take the boy to Victor so that he may be resurrected, telling him not to return otherwise. Sir Malcolm and the others head to Dracula's lair to confront him and save Vanessa. They fend off an attack by a large group of Dracula's "children" but Dracula himself subdues them. Ethan slips away and finds Vanessa. At her request, Ethan shoots her to end the darkness. As the deadly fog clears away, Sir Malcolm, Victor and Ethan consider their futures, the Creature places his son's body into the river and Vanessa's funeral is held. The Creature watches from a distance and then comes to kneel alone at her grave.

== Ratings ==
Penny Dreadful : U.S. viewers per episode (thousands)

Season	Episode number										Average
Season	1	2	3	4	5	6	7	8	9	10	Average
1	872	722	734	730	797	681	799	856	–		770
2	575	536	639	640	712	566	572	523	604	746	610
3	540	554	599	482	656	722	651	448	551	–	578

Audience measurement performed by Nielsen Media Research
