= Christian Berger =

Austrian cinematographer

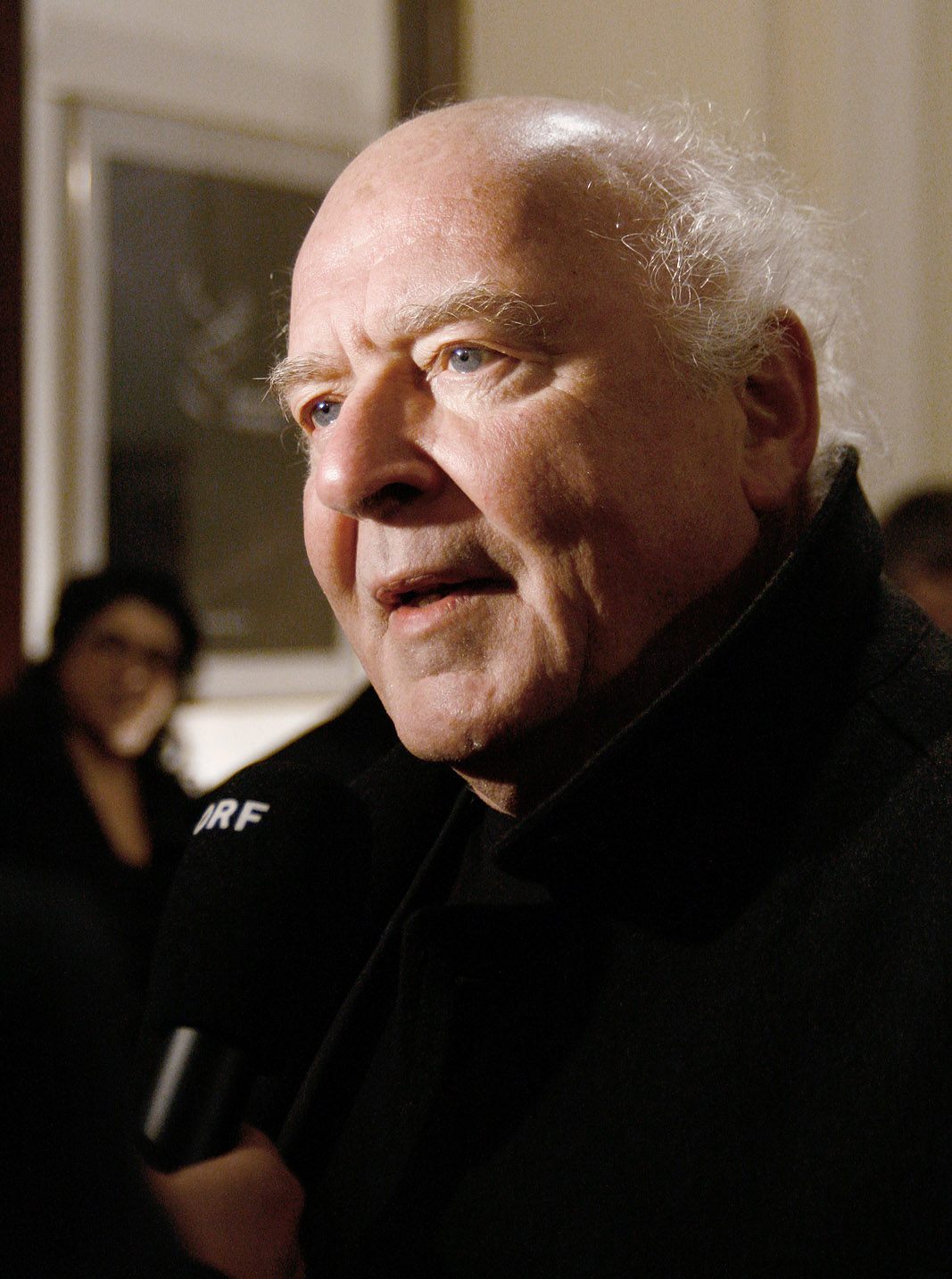
- Berger at the Austrian Film Awards 2011 at the Odeon theater in Vienna.
- Born: 13 January 1945 (age 81); Innsbruck, Tyrol, Nazi Germany
- Occupations: Filmmaker, cinematographer
- Years active: 1968–present
- Spouse: Marika Green

Christian Berger (born 13 January 1945) is an Austrian cinematographer known for his work with Michael Haneke. His 1985 film Raffl was entered into the 14th Moscow International Film Festival. In February 2010, Berger was nominated for an Academy Award for Best Cinematography for his work on The White Ribbon at the 82nd Academy Awards. He also won the ASC Award for Best Cinematography for the same film.

Berger invented the Cine Reflect Lighting System which he used on his latest films. Besides his work as director of photography he also teaches cinematography at the Vienna Film Academy.

Berger is married to actress Marika Green and is the uncle of Eva Green.

== Filmography ==
Feature films

- Raffl (1984)
- Benny's Video (1992)
- 71 Fragments of a Chronology of Chance (1994)
- The Piano Teacher (2001)
- Ne fais pas ça! (2004)
- Caché (2005)
- Disengagement (2007)
- The White Ribbon (2009)
- Ludwig II (2012)
- The Notebook (2013)
- By the Sea (2015)
- Night of a 1000 Hours (2016)
- Happy End (2017)

== See also ==
- List of German-speaking Academy Award winners and nominees
