= Haparanda Nyheter =

Swedish newspaper

Haparanda Nyheter (lit. 'Haparanda News') was a Swedish-language twice-weekly newspaper published from Haparanda, Sweden, between 1916 and 1917. It was linked to the Finnish-language newspaper Haaparannan sanomat. Pär Axelsson was the editor of the newspaper.
