= EuroCity (disambiguation) =

EuroCity may refer to:

- EuroCity, a rail network
- EuroCity, a common name used by the twin towns of Tornio and Haparanda
