= Haaparannan sanomat =

Finnish-language newspaper in Sweden

Haaparannan sanomat ('Haparanda News') was a Finnish-language twice-weekly liberal newspaper published from Haparanda, Sweden, between 1916 and 1917. It was linked to the Swedish-language newspaper Haparanda Nyheter. Arwi Hällfors was the editor of the newspaper.
