= Ava Lord =

- Sin City character
- Eva Green as Ava Lord in Sin City: A Dame to Kill For
- First appearance: A Dame to Kill For
- Last appearance: Sin City: A Dame to Kill For (2014)
- Created by: Frank Miller
- Portrayed by: Eva Green
- Publisher: Dark Horse Comics

In-universe information
- Full name: Ava Lord (maiden name unknown)
- Gender: Female
- Residence: Basin City

Ava Lord in A Dame to Kill For

Ava Lord is a fictional character in Frank Miller's Sin City universe, the title character in the graphic novel A Dame to Kill For. An ex-lover of Dwight McCarthy, she manipulates men with her good looks and an innocent facade for her own personal gain or amusement. An expert liar, she is considered a goddess by Manute, her towering manservant, and a "manipulative bitch" by Dwight. She represents the classic femme fatale, acting as a foil to Dwight's hard-boiled antihero.

In the film adaptation, Ava Lord is portrayed by Eva Green.

== Background ==
One night, Dwight McCarthy receives a call from Ava, asking him to meet her at a seedy bar called Kadie's Club Pecos. She had broken his heart nearly four years prior — a month or so before John Hartigan's release from prison in That Yellow Bastard — but he agrees to meet her. Marv is also there and greets Dwight. Ava arrives late and tries to persuade Dwight to take her back, claiming that her life is "a living Hell." Dwight refuses as Manute arrives, taking Ava away. Dwight goes home, but cannot sleep, so he decides to check up on Ava and her new husband, Damien Lord.

He hops a fence and, using his photography equipment, scopes out the estate. He is discovered and claims that he is a peeping tom. Manute seemingly doesn't recognize him, but beats him brutally anyway. Dwight calls Agamemnon for a ride home, and they stop to get pizza. As he arrives home, he finds his Ford Mustang returned and his door unlocked. In his bedroom is a nude Ava. They eventually reconcile and make love. Manute arrives and violently beats a naked Dwight. Dwight is knocked out of his upper story apartment window, where he blacks out momentarily. He awakens to find Manute driving off with Ava.

Dwight arrives at Kadie's, where Marv is in the middle of a squabble with some out-of-town punks. One of them pulls a gun on Marv, who knocks him flat. Dwight convinces Marv to help him storm Damien's estate. They drink together and watch Nancy Callahan dance. As they approach the mansion, Dwight insists Marv leave the punk's gun, which Marv has procured, in the car. Marv tackles the guards as a distraction and eventually takes on Manute. Marv rips Manute's right eye out and beats him savagely. With Manute occupied, Dwight makes his way to Damien. When he finds him, he beats him to death. Ava appears, and explains how Dwight was all a part of her plan to get Damien murdered so she could inherit his estate. She shoots Dwight six times, including once in the head. Dwight once again falls out of a window and is picked up by Marv.

Two detectives following up on Damien Lord's death, Mort and Bob, talk to Ava. She claims that Dwight was a stalker who killed Damien out of jealousy. They believe her story, and Mort starts sleeping with her. They interrogate Agamemnon, who defends Dwight as an upright man who went clean after a wild youth of alcoholism. When they speak with Dwight's landlady, she says she let Ava in the night of Damien's murder, and heard a loud fight. Bob doubts Ava considerably now, while Mort, still sleeping with Ava, becomes more on-edge towards his partner. This culminates with Mort killing Bob, then committing suicide.

Meanwhile, Dwight is recovering from his near-fatal wounds and calls Ava to inform her he's coming for her soon. Ava, with her late husband's financial assets, is joining her corporation with the mob boss Wallenquist. Wallenquist, unaffected by Ava's flirting, warns her not to flirt with him again and tells her to tie up her loose end with Dwight and has someone arriving from Phoenix soon to meet her about that.

Dwight, who now has a new face, poses as Wallenquist's man from Phoenix, accompanied by Gail and Miho. Once inside Ava's estate, Manute sees past the new face and captures Dwight. Gail and Miho strike from Dwight's car, and Dwight shoots Manute with a hidden .25 he had up his left sleeve. Six bullets fail to kill him, and Manute aims at Dwight as Ava grabs one of Manute's guns, shooting Manute in his shoulder. Manute falls through a window and upon landing, Miho stabs him in the arms, pinning him to the ground. Ava then tries telling Dwight that Manute had her under mind control to manipulate her and Damien and that it would be a cruel irony if he killed her now. Dwight finally sees through all the lies and kills Ava.

== Film portrayal ==
Ava Lord appears in Sin City: A Dame to Kill For, the sequel to the 2005 movie Sin City, which was based on Miller's graphic novels, released in 2014. She features prominently in the third and most substantial story of the film, A Dame to Kill For, which is based on the same story by Frank Miller. In the film, Ava is portrayed by actress Eva Green, whose role was announced in January 2013. Prior to Green's casting, actresses Rose McGowan and Salma Hayek were rumoured to play Ava, while director Robert Rodríguez and Miller had expressed interest in 2006 for Angelina Jolie to play Ava.

== Reception ==
"Ava Lord is one of Eva Green's more hard-boiled character creations in the femme fatale mode." Inside that category of stock character, she is also described as a "spider woman", "using men for [her] dirty work" and "stripping them of their wealth and dignity".
