= Mia Green =

Swedish photographer (1870–1949)

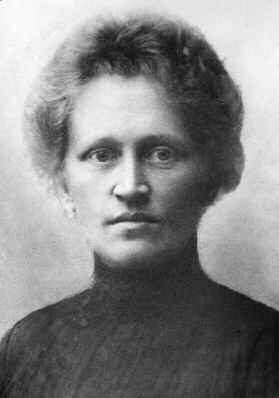
- Born: Maria Amalia Lundmark; 14 April 1870; Nor, Roslags-Bro, Norrtälje Municipality, Uppland, Sweden-Norway
- Died: 24 June 1949 (aged 79); Haparanda, Haparanda Municipality, Sweden
- Known for: Photography and social care
- Family: Marika Green (granddaughter); Eva Green (great-granddaughter)

Maria Amalia "Mia" Green (née Lundmark; 14 April 1870 – 24 June 1949) was a Swedish photographer and feminist activist. She documented history in that era, particularly during the First World War. She was also involved in the local suffrage association and in creating care for the elderly.

== Life ==
She was born in Nor, Roslags-Bro, in Norrtälje Municipality (in the Swedish province of Uppland) on 14 April 1870 and died in Haparanda, Haparanda Municipality, on 24 June 1949, the natural daughter of Maria Christina Lundmark.

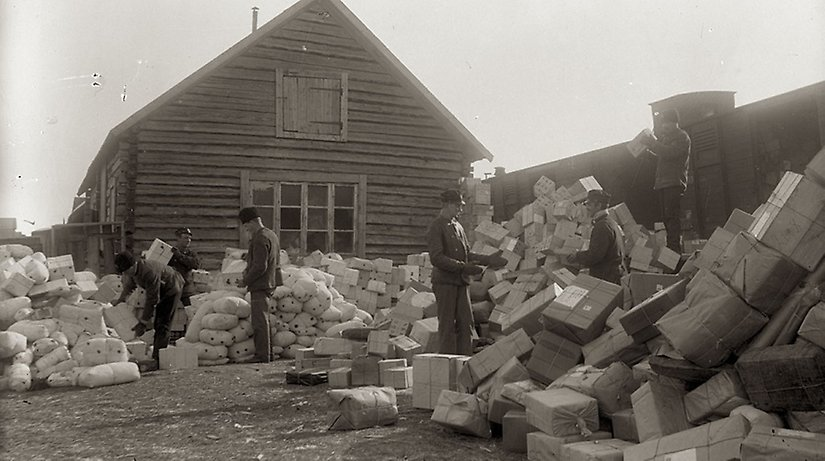
Karungi Overseas post sorting photographed by Green during WWI.

She grew up with her maternal grandparents in Skellefteå. She became as a young adult a photographer in Haparanda (which is in Sweden but close to the border with Finland), where she opened her first photo studio and later opened branches in Kemi (Finland) and Seskarö.

Haparanda marked a point where the Swedish and Russian rail systems came very close to each other. Although her town was small it became very significant during World War I when thousands of mothers and children, invalid prisoners of war and thousands of tonnes of mail were exchanged. Because of this, Green had the opportunity to photograph refugees and soldiers and was often able to sell the images to Stockholm newspapers. She is best known for documenting Haparanda and Tornedalen between 1895 and 1940.

== Family ==
In 1898, Mia married seminary teacher and church musician Bror Ulrik Green (Haparanda, Norrbotten County, 1869-1949), son of Olof Wilhelm Green and wife Karolina Vilhelmina Kock. She was the mother of Swedish journalist Bror Lennart Green, the grandmother of Swedish-French actress Marika Green and the great-grandmother of the French actress Eva Green. The surname "Green" [ˈɡɾeːn] is Swedish, derived from the Swedish word "gren", which means "tree branch". It does not originate from the English word "green", which is "grön" in Swedish.

== Photography ==
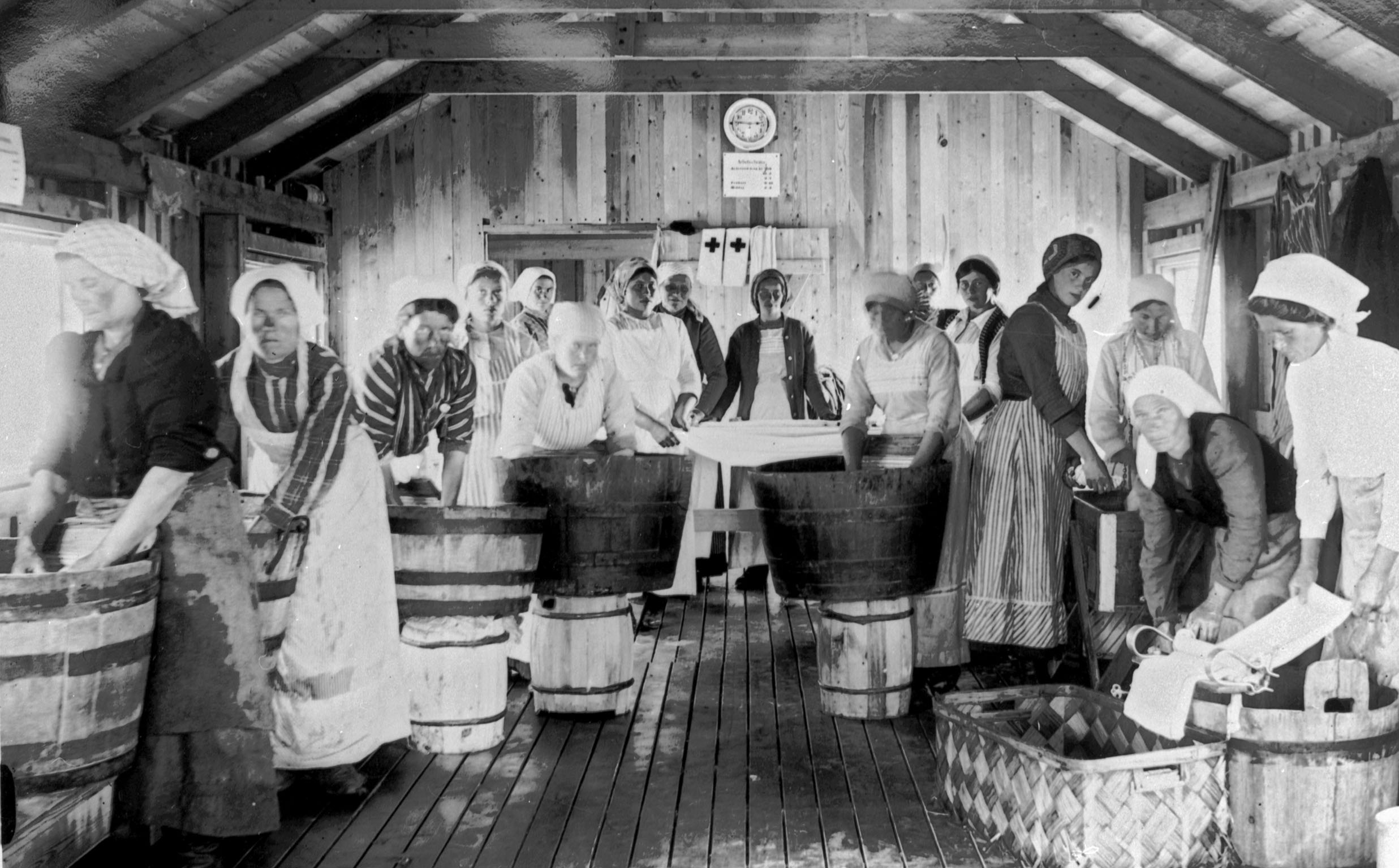
Washerwomen during a typhus outbreak in Haparanda in 1918

She was known for the photographic record that she created during the First World War which included Red Cross sisters and war invalids. In 1918 she recorded a typhus outbreak in Haparanda.

One of her students was Hilda Augusta Larsson, who was Swedish but established a photography business in Finland.

Her pictures recorded notable politicians, opera singers and nobility as well as revolutionaries, spies and smugglers, but she is also remembered for the work she did in establishing care for the elderly.

== Political ==
Green was also a women's rights activist, heading the Haparanda branch of the National Association for Women's Suffrage (LKPR) which was founded in 1907. In 1913, she served as a member of the organization's central executive. Under the local branch, efforts were also made to help the many refugees passing through the town. On the political front, she was elected to the town council, representing the conservative party. Active in municipal politics, she was behind the construction of Haparanda's first nursing home.

== Legacy ==
A memorial was created in her memory in her home parish with a bust by Lars Stålnacke.

She has a park created in her memory in Haparanda.
