= Marika Green =

Swedish-French actress (born 1943)

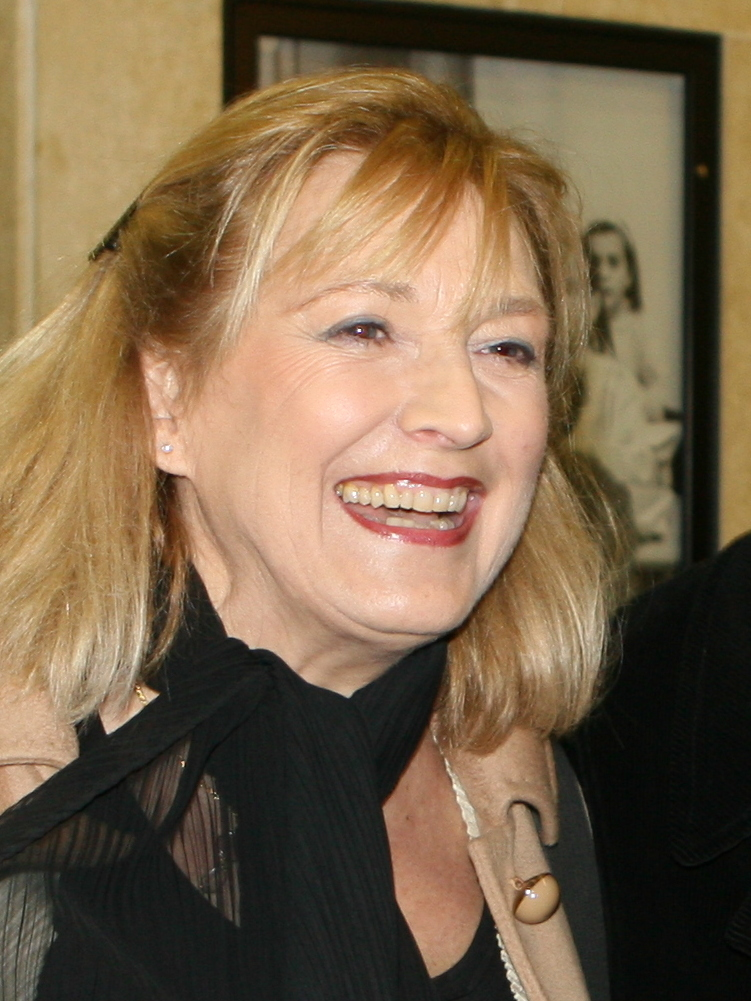
- Green in 2013
- Born: Marika Nicolette Green; 21 June 1943 (age 82); Stockholm, Sweden
- Occupation: Actress
- Spouse: Christian Berger
- Relatives: Paul Le Flem (maternal grandfather); Eva Green (niece)

Marika Nicolette Green (born 21 June 1943) is a Swedish-French actress.

== Life and career ==
Green was born in Södermalm, Stockholm, Stockholm County, the daughter of a French mother, Jeanne Green-Le Flem, born in Paris, and Bror Lennart Green, a Swedish journalist. Her paternal grandmother was the photographer Mia Green and her maternal grandfather was French composer and music critic Paul Le Flem. She left Sweden for France in 1953.

She played the lead female role in Robert Bresson's Pickpocket at the age of 16.

She is the aunt of actress Eva Green and older sister of Walter Green, husband of actress and author Marlène Jobert. Green married Austrian cinematographer Christian Berger, regular collaborator of director Michael Haneke.

== Filmography ==
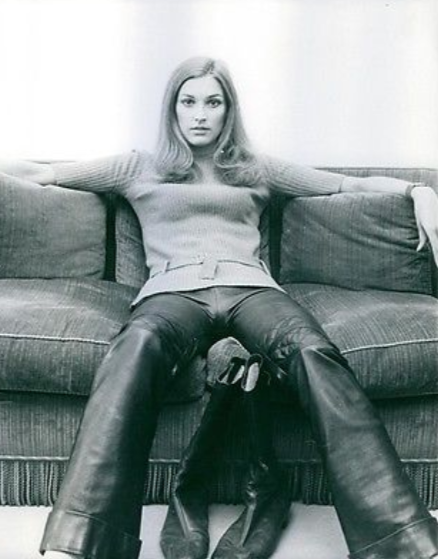
Green in 1968

- Pickpocket (1959) by Robert Bresson : Jeanne
- Le Récit de Rebecca (1964) by Paul Vecchiali
- Five Ashore in Singapore (1967) by Bernard Toublanc-Michel
- Le Golem (television - 1967) by Louis Pauwels and Jean Kerchbron
- Rider on the Rain (1969) by René Clément
- L'Affaire Crazy Capo (1973)
- Emmanuelle (1974) by Just Jaeckin : Bee
- Le Bal des voyous (1968) by Jean-Claude Dague
- La Fille d'en face (1968) by Jean-Daniel Simon
- Until September (1984) by Richard Marquand
- Hanna en mer (1991) by Christian Berger
