= Haparanda Stadshotell =

Hotel in Haparanda, Sweden

Coordinates: 65.8356°N 24.1352°E

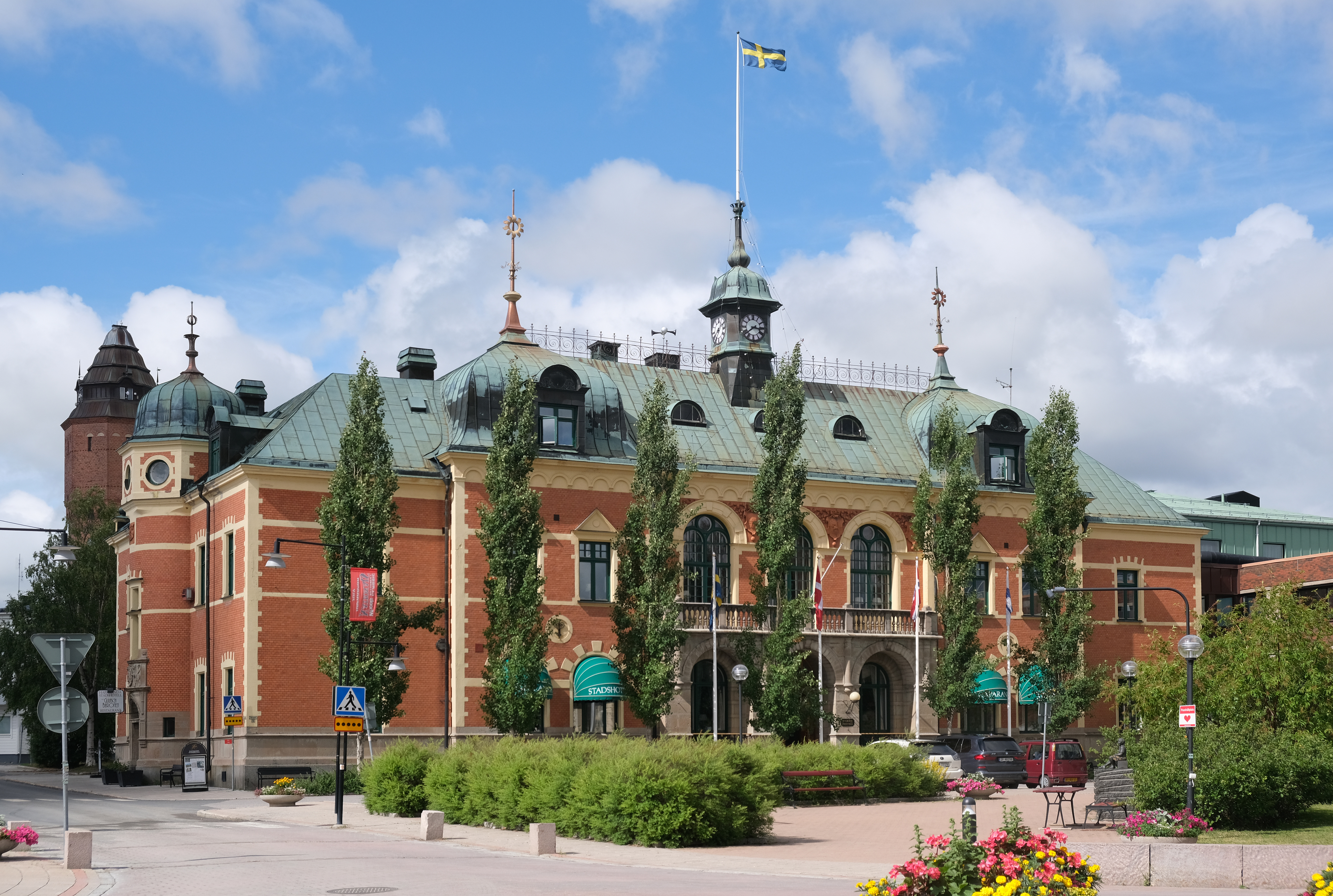
- Hotel exterior in 2022
- Interactive map of the Haparanda Stadshotell area

General information
- Architectural style: Classical
- Location: Torget 7, Haparanda, Sweden
- Opened: 5 December 1900; 125 years ago
- Owner: Susanne Wallin

Design and construction
- Architects: Fritz Ullrich; Eduard Hallquisth

Website
- haparandastadshotell.se

The Haparanda Stadshotell is a hotel in Haparanda, Sweden.

== History ==
After a previous inn on the site burned down in the late 1800s, planning began for a grand new building which would serve as a combined town hall and hotel, designed to raise Haparanda's profile. The hotel was designed by Fritz Ullrich and Eduard Hallquisth, architects from Stockholm known for their work on courthouses and bank buildings. The hotel had a soft opening on 1 November 1900 before its official public inauguration on 5 December. The hotel is owned by Susanne Wallin. She has run it with her son Anton since 1 July 2017.

== Architecture ==
The hotel was constructed in the classical style, with marble, brick, and granite. Some materials were imported from the Province of Silesia. There are 92 guest rooms and sauna facilities.
