= Raffl =

1985 film

- Directed by: Christian Berger
- Produced by: Christian Berger
- Starring: Lois Weinberger
- Cinematography: Christian Berger
- Release date: May 1984
- Running time: 95 minutes
- Country: Austria
- Language: German

Raffl is a 1984 Austrian drama film directed by Christian Berger. It was entered into the 14th Moscow International Film Festival. The film was screened for the Directors' Fortnight at the 1984 Cannes Film Festival.

== Cast ==
- Lois Weinberger as Franz Raffl
- Dietmar Schönherr as Pastor
- Barbara Weber as Raffl's wife
- Barbara Viertl as Raffl's foster daughter
- Herbert Rhom
- Lothar Dellago
- Arthur Brauss
- Franz Mössmer
- Isolde Ferlesch

== See also ==
- The Judas of Tyrol (1933)
