= Eva Green =

French actress (born 1980)

- Eva Green at the 81st Venice International Film Festival, 2024
- Born: Eva Gaëlle Green; 6 July 1980 (age 46); Paris, France
- Citizenship: France; United Kingdom
- Education: American University of Paris; Webber Douglas Academy of Dramatic Art
- Occupations: Actress; model
- Years active: 2001–present
- Parents: Walter Green (father); Marlène Jobert (mother)
- Relatives: Paul Le Flem (great-grandfather); Mia Green (great-grandmother); Marika Green (aunt); Elsa Lunghini (cousin); Joséphine Jobert (cousin)
- Awards: BAFTA Rising Star Award; Ordre des Arts et des Lettres

Eva Gaëlle Green (French: [eva ɡa.ɛl ɡʁeːn]; Swedish: [ˈêːva ˈɡreːn]; born 6 July 1980) is a French actress, known for starring in both major studio and independent productions, in which she often portrays eccentric, villainous, and complex characters. The daughter of actress Marlène Jobert, she began her career in theatre before making her film debut in Bernardo Bertolucci's The Dreamers (2003). She portrayed Sibylla, Queen of Jerusalem in Kingdom of Heaven (2005). The following year, she played Bond girl Vesper Lynd in the James Bond film Casino Royale (2006), for which she received the BAFTA Rising Star Award.

Green has since starred in numerous independent films, including Cracks (2009), Womb (2010), and Perfect Sense (2011). In 2014, she played Artemisia in the 300 sequel 300: Rise of an Empire and Ava Lord in Frank Miller and Robert Rodriguez's Sin City sequel Sin City: A Dame to Kill For. Green is also known for her collaborations with director Tim Burton, starring as Angelique Bouchard in the horror comedy film Dark Shadows (2012), the title character of the fantasy film Miss Peregrine's Home for Peculiar Children (2016), Colette Marchant in the fantasy film Dumbo (2019) and as Ophelia Frump for the upcoming third season of Wednesday (2027). For her role as an astronaut mother in the drama film Proxima (2019), she earned a nomination for the César Award for Best Actress.

On television, Green has starred as Morgan Pendragon in the Starz historical fantasy series Camelot (2011). She also starred as Vanessa Ives in the Showtime horror drama series Penny Dreadful (2014–2016), earning critical acclaim and a nomination for Best Actress in a Television Series – Drama at the 73rd Golden Globe Awards.

Outside acting, she has collaborated with various luxury brands and been an ambassador for Bulgari and Roger Vivier.

== Early life ==
Green was born on 6 July 1980, two minutes earlier than her fraternal twin sister Joy. She is the daughter of French actress and author Marlène Jobert and Walter Green, a Swedish dental surgeon and occasional actor in his youth (Au hasard Balthazar directed by Robert Bresson).

Green is of Sephardic Jewish descent through her Algerian-Jewish maternal great-grandfather. She is the great-granddaughter of French composer Paul Le Flem and of Swedish photographer Mia Green, the niece of actress Marika Green and the maternal first cousin of singer Elsa Lunghini and actress Joséphine Jobert. The surname "Green" [ˈɡɾeːn] has nothing to do with the color green; instead being derived from the Swedish word gren, which means 'tree branch'.

Green was raised in France and attended the American University of Paris, an English-speaking institution. She developed an interest in Egyptology when she visited the Louvre at age seven. At age 14, after seeing Isabelle Adjani in The Story of Adele H., Green decided to become an actress. She has also stated that watching Jack Nicholson's performance in the 1980 movie The Shining laid the groundwork for her future profession. Her mother initially feared that an acting career would be too much for her sensitive daughter, but later came to support her ambitions. Green continued her studies at Cours Eva Saint Paul in Paris and took an acting course at the Webber Douglas Academy of Dramatic Art in London. After that, Green returned to Paris, where she performed in several plays. Green stated that when she was in drama school, she "always picked the really evil roles" because "it's a great way to deal with your everyday emotions".

== Career ==
=== 2001–2005: Career beginnings and early breakthrough ===
In 2001, Green began her professional acting debut on stage in Esther Villar's Jalousie en trois fax, directed by Didier Long at the Théâtre de Paris, for which she was nominated for a Molière Award. She also appeared in Turcaret (2002).

In 2003, Green made her film debut and breakthrough in Bernardo Bertolucci's controversial erotic drama film The Dreamers (2003), which involved her in extensive full frontal nude scenes, as well as graphic sex scenes. Green told The Guardian that her agent and her parents begged her not to take the role, concerned that the film would cause her career to "have the same destiny as Maria Schneider", because of Schneider's traumatic experience during the filming of Bertolucci's Last Tango in Paris. Green said that with Bertolucci's guidance she felt comfortable during the filming of the nude and sex scenes but was embarrassed when her family saw the film. Green expressed surprise when a minute was cut from the film for the American market, stating, "[T]here is so much violence, both on the streets and on the screen. They think nothing of it. Yet I think they are frightened by sex." Her performance was highly praised, with critics describing her role as sensual and daring; David Rooney of Variety commented, "Eva Green delivers a striking debut, bringing a mix of fragility and sensuality to Isabelle. She is the film's revelation, and her presence elevates the material." Roger Ebert of the Chicago Sun-Times also highlighted Green as "a discovery. She has a gift for combining innocence with eroticism, and she makes Isabelle both vulnerable and dangerous." Some compared her to Liv Tyler.

Her next film was Arsène Lupin (2004), in which she portrayed Lupin's love interest. She enjoyed the light-hearted role, although she has stated that she generally prefers more complex characters.

Her performance in The Dreamers led Ridley Scott to cast Green in Kingdom of Heaven (2005), a film about the Crusades where she played Sibylla, Princess of Jerusalem. Green performed six screen tests and was hired only a week before principal photography began. Green found the atmosphere of coming onto a film so late tense and exciting, and she liked the film's ambiguity in approaching its subject matter. To her disappointment, much of her screen time was cut. Stephanie Zacharek of Salon.com praised her performance: "She doesn't quite know what to do with her character's stilted dialogue, but she carries herself so regally that you barely notice." Nev Pierce of the BBC, however, called her character "limp". Green was satisfied when her character's complex subplot was restored in the director's cut. Total Film said the new scenes completed her performance: "In the theatrical cut, Princess Sibylla sleeps with Balian and then, more or less, loses her mind. Now we understand why. Not only does Sibylla have a young son, but when she realizes he's afflicted with leprosy just like her brother Baldwin, she decides to take his life shortly after he's been crowned king."

=== 2006–2011: Casino Royale and further roles ===
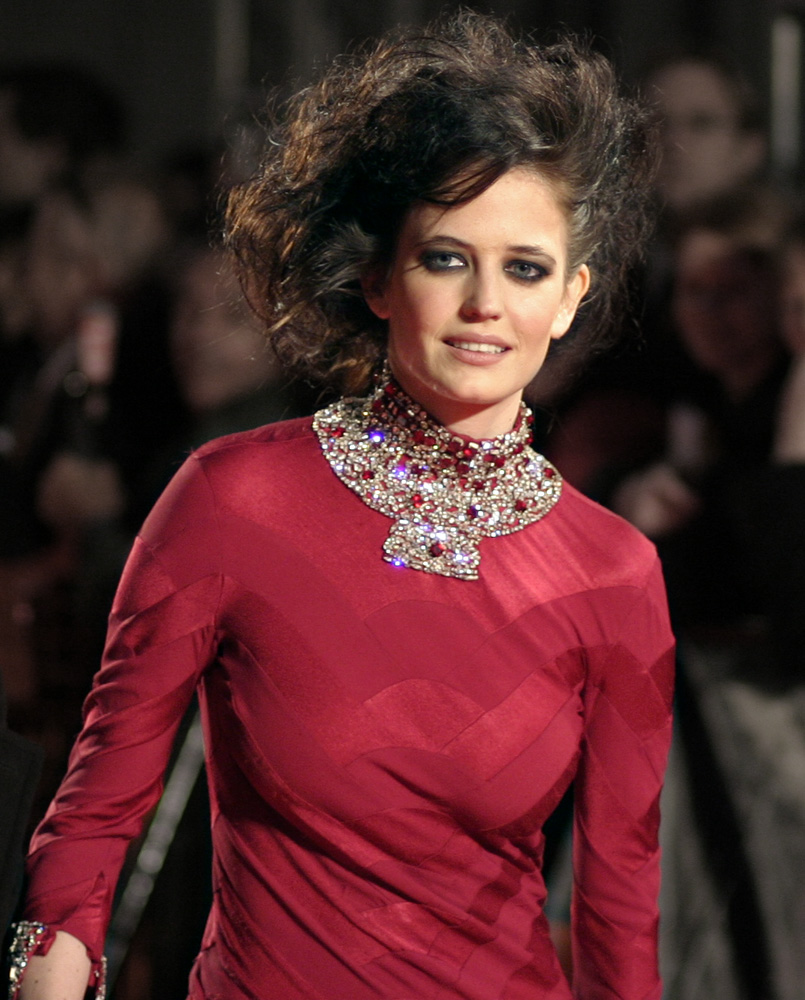
Green at the 2007 BAFTA Awards

Green was cast at the last minute for the role of Vesper Lynd in the 2006 James Bond film Casino Royale. Green was approached in mid-2005 but turned it down. Principal photography was already underway, and director Martin Campbell said casting the role was difficult because "we didn't have the final script and a Bond girl always had the connotation of tits 'n' ass." Campbell saw Green's performance in the director's cut of Kingdom of Heaven, and approached Green again. She read the script, and found the character of Vesper far deeper than most Bond girls. Green's performance was critically praised, Entertainment Weekly called her the fourth-best Bond girl of all time; IGN named her the best femme fatale, stating, "This is the girl that broke – and therefore made – James Bond"; and she won the BAFTA Rising Star Award and an Empire award for her performance. Both awards were voted for by the British public.

Green was considered for roles in The Constant Gardener (a role that went to Rachel Weisz) and The Black Dahlia.

Green portrayed the witch Serafina Pekkala in the 2007 film adaptation of The Golden Compass. Green hoped the religious themes of the book would be preserved, but references to Catholicism were removed from the film.

In February 2008, Green appeared in the sci-fi thriller film Franklyn as the tormented artist Emilia, (who Green compared to real-life figures Sophie Calle and Tracey Emin) and the mysterious Sally, who she described as "full of life, very witty, big sense of humor".

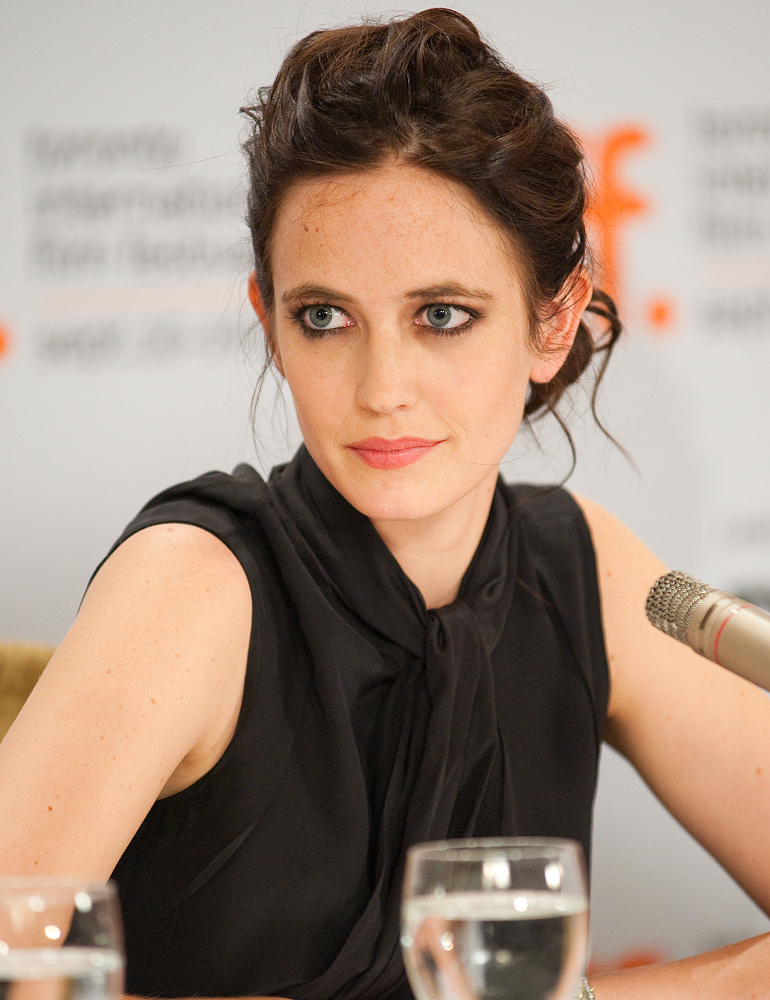
Green at the 2009 Toronto International Film Festival

In 2009, she appeared in the psychological film Cracks, in which she plays an enigmatic diving instructor of an elite all-female school who becomes obsessed with one of her students, directed by Jordan Scott in Scott's feature directorial debut. She also appeared in Womb (2009), where she plays a woman who clones her dead boyfriend. It is a collaboration between actor Matt Smith and director Benedek Fliegauf.

She was considered for the role eventually played by Cécile de France in Un Secret (2007). Additionally, she was initially approached for the female lead in Lars von Trier's controversial film Antichrist (2009). According to Trier, Green was positive about appearing in the film, but her agents refused to allow her. The unsuccessful casting attempt took two months of the film's pre-production process. Anglo-French actress Charlotte Gainsbourg was subsequently cast in the role. Green later said that she got along well with Trier, "but then we started talking about nudity and sex and so on. It got a bit too far ... It was my dream to work with him, but it's a shame it was on that film that it nearly happened. I'm sure I would have been trashed doing that film".

In 2011, Green signed with United Talent Agency in the US, remaining represented by Tavistock Wood in the UK. Green then starred in the first season of Starz's series, Camelot, as the sorceress Morgan le Fay. Green stated, "This is such an iconic story and you have 10 episodes to explore a character. It's not a girlfriend role that you could have in a movie. It's a real ballsy character. She has some guts."

=== 2012–2019: Villainous roles and critical acclaim with Penny Dreadful ===
In 2012, she played Angelique Bouchard, a villainous witch, opposite Johnny Depp in Tim Burton's comedy horror film Dark Shadows. Many critics emphasized Green's seductive energy and screen presence as a standout and major strength, even though the film itself was considered weak.

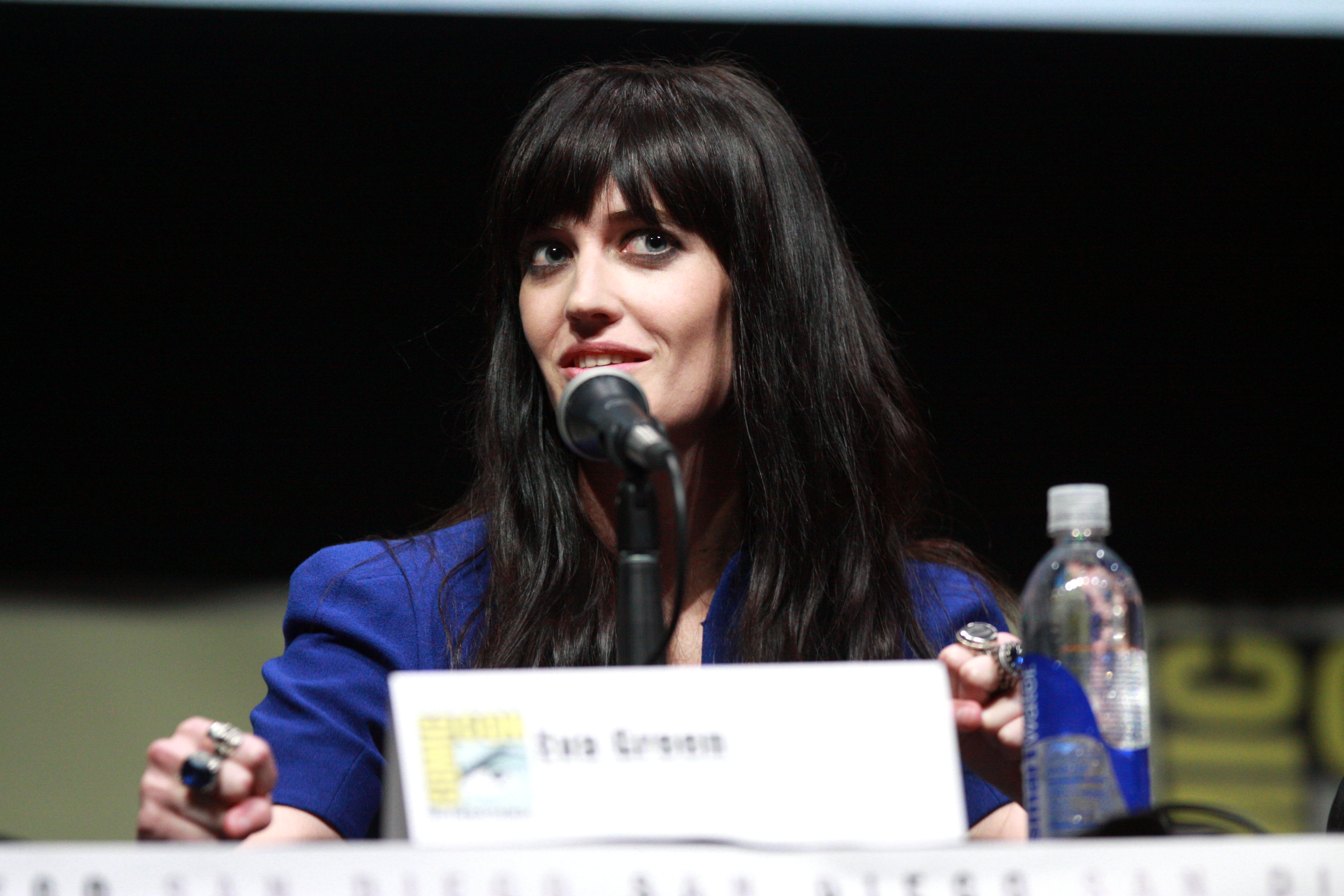
Green at the 2013 San Diego Comic Con

In 2014, Green played naval commander Artemisia in the historical action film 300: Rise of an Empire, the sequel to 300. Her performance received critical praise, despite the film's mixed to negative reception. Rafer Guzman in his Newsday review stated, "The one bright spot is Eva Green as Xerxes' machinator, Artemesia, a raccoon-eyed warrior princess... Green plays a snarling, insatiable, self-hating femme fatale and completely steals the show." Stephanie Zacharek wrote in The Village Voice that "Rise of an Empire might have been essentially more of the same, but for one distinction that makes it 300 times better than its predecessor: Mere mortals of Athens, Sparta, and every city from Mumbai to Minneapolis, behold the magnificent Eva Green, and tremble!"

From 2014 to 2016, Green starred in the Showtime horror drama series Penny Dreadful as Vanessa Ives. Her performance received widespread acclaim from critics, with Eric Diaz of Nerdist writing, "Eva Green as Vanessa Ives was really a Master Class in acting, and hopefully someone will give her a damn Emmy this time." The A.V. Club described Green as "a fearless actress who has no time for pedestrian concerns about vanity or what some might consider to be over the top." For her performance, she earned a nomination for Best Actress in a Television Series – Drama at the 73rd Golden Globe Awards.

In 2014, she played the titular role of Ava Lord, a villainous femme fatale in the Sin City sequel film Sin City: A Dame to Kill For. Green's performance was praised as the standout element of the film despite its negative reviews. The Guardian said that Green "brings a dangerous charisma to Ava Lord, the most compelling presence in the movie."Variety stated that she "delivers a deliciously over‑the‑top femme fatale turn [and].., commanding every scene she's in."

In 2016, Green reunited with Tim Burton in Miss Peregrine's Home for Peculiar Children, a film based on the 2011 novel by Ransom Riggs. Green collaborated once more with Burton in Disney's 2019 live-action adaptation of Dumbo, co-starring with Colin Farrell and Michael Keaton. In 2018, she was appointed as a Chevalier of the Ordre des Arts et des Lettres, an honorary award given by the French government.

In 2019, she starred in the French drama film Proxima directed by Alice Winocour. Green's performance in the movie was met with critical acclaim, and she was eventually nominated for the César Award for Best Actress. In 2020, she starred as Lydia Wells in the BBC One miniseries The Luminaries, based on the 2013 novel by Eleanor Catton.

=== A Patriot film abandonment and lawsuit ===
In April 2018, it was announced that Green would star in the sci-fi thriller film A Patriot. In August 2020, it was reported that the actress, who was also an executive producer on the project, was suing the production company, White Lantern Film, because it had refused to pay her an £800,000 ($1.04 million) fee after the project was abandoned, and a pay-or-play contract had been agreed on. In its own suit, White Lantern claims Green derailed the film, for example demanding that additional expensive crew be hired. The company also claimed Green owed it more than £1 million ($1.3 million) after walking away from the project. Green won the lawsuit in April 2023.

During the lawsuit, WhatsApp messages between Green and friends included references to her describing potential crew members as "shitty peasants", the production as a "B-shitty-movie" and producer Jake Seal as "pure vomit". However, the judge found: "She may have said some extremely unpleasant things about Mr Seal and his crew at Black Hangar, but this was borne from a genuine feeling of concern that any film made under Mr Seal's control would be of very low quality and would not do justice to a script that she and the former directors were passionate about."

=== 2022–present: Later works and expanding thriller roles ===
Green appeared in Nocebo, a psychological thriller produced by teams from Ireland and the Philippines, released on 4 November 2022 in the US and on 9 December 2022 in the UK and Ireland. In June 2021, it was announced that Green would serve as the lead character in the British-French Apple TV+ thriller series Liaison, co-starring Vincent Cassel. The series premiered on 24 February 2023.

In 2023, she portrayed Milady de Winter in two French film adaptations of Alexandre Dumas' 1844 novel The Three Musketeers; The Three Musketeers: D'Artagnan and The Three Musketeers: Milady, both directed by Martin Bourboulon. Green reunited with Casino Royale director Martin Campbell in the action thriller film Dirty Angels, in which she plays a soldier assigned to rescue a group of teenage girls from ISIS terrorists. The film was released in cinemas and on demand on 13 December 2024.

In 2026, Green starred in the Turkish psychological horror Trees Are Watching, written and directed by Bahman Ghobadi and executive produced by Martin Scorsese. In the same year, she also reunited for a third time with director Martin Campbell for the action thriller Just Play Dead, opposite Samuel L. Jackson.

Upcoming projects

Green is set to star in Cary Joji Fukunaga's crime thriller Blood on Snow, alongside Benedict Cumberbatch and Aaron Taylor Johnson. In November 2025, it was announced that she would play Ophelia Frump for the third season of the Netflix series Wednesday, directed by Tim Burton and marking their fourth collaboration.

== Other activities ==
=== Juries ===
Green served on the jury of the 2024 Cannes Film Festival, chaired by Greta Gerwig.

=== Advertising ===
Green has collaborated with various luxury brands throughout her career including modelling for the 2003 and 2005 Emporio Armani fashion collections. She also fronted perfume campaigns for Lancome's "Attraction" in 2006, and Dior's "Midnight Poison" in 2007, and a Montblanc accessories campaign in 2007.

In 2015, she was featured as the face of L'Oréal Professionnel, a campaign that promoted the Tecni.ART Wet Domination haircare and styling products, and in Campari calendar.

In 2020, she became brand ambassador for Bulgari, and has campaigned for Alexander McQueen. She is also brand ambassador for Roger Vivier, for which she was featured in the 2024 short film Vivier Express and in the 2025 "La Rose Vivier" rose–themed campaign, both for heels and handbags, and with creative director Gherardo Felloni.

== Personal life ==
Green has been living in London since 2005. She said that she is happier in England than in France.

When asked about her preference to play graphic, sexually charged roles, Green described it as "paradoxical" given her self-confessed shyness. She commented humorously, "I don't really understand why I do that. I need to go through therapy!" Green also favours dark, twisted characters, as they allow her to feel liberated. She spoke about her role in Penny Dreadful as, "it's like I don't have a corset anymore when I'm playing Vanessa, you know? People will think that it's terrible to have fun in a show like that. But I do." However, she has tried to take more diverse roles in order to avoid being typecast.

Green is non-religious Jewish, though she describes herself as "very spiritual" and having complex beliefs about supernatural forces.

Green has expressed interest in returning to theatre. She says she has no plans to work in Hollywood full-time because "the problem with Hollywood is that the studios are super powerful, they have far more power than the directors... [my] ambition at this moment is just to find a good script". Her hobbies are playing the piano, composing music and collecting art.

From 2005 to 2009, she was in a romantic relationship with her Kingdom of Heaven co-star Marton Csokas.

In 2017, she revealed that Harvey Weinstein made an inappropriate advance during a business meeting but she "pushed him off".

In a 2020 interview with Town & Country magazine, Green said she did not currently want children, citing fear of judgement and public scrutiny, and explaining that she "can't visualise [herself] embracing motherhood any time soon". She added, "I don't know. For now, no. What will be, will be. It's difficult — it's the judgement of other people, really."

Green has collaborated with various charities, including Save the Children, which works to improve the welfare and education of children worldwide. She has also lent her voice to environmental and conservation efforts, notably working with the Singita Grumeti Fund in Tanzania. As an ambassador for its Environmental Education Center, she has promoted programs that teach local students about sustainability and the protection of natural resources.

== Public image ==
Green's sex appeal has often been discussed in the media, and critics have described her as a sex symbol. Fashion outlets such as W Magazine and Vogue have described her as a style icon, emphasizing her avant-garde and gothic glamour, which extends to her dark and seductive roles—reinforcing her image as a "cinematic femme fatale".

Green has appeared on the cover of several famous magazines, including Vogue Italia (2007), British GQ (2014), Elle Russia (2010), (2015), Harper's Bazaar UK (2012), Elle (2015), W Magazine (2016), Glamour Italia (2016), Madame Figaro (2023), Vanity Fair France (2023), Vogue Greece (2023) and Harper's Bazaar Taiwan (2025).

== Filmography ==
Key
†	Denotes films that have not yet been released

=== Film ===
Year	Title	Role	Notes
2001	The Piano Teacher	Walter's friend	Uncredited
2003	The Dreamers	Isabelle	
2004	Arsène Lupin	Clarisse de Dreux-Soubise	
2005	Kingdom of Heaven	Sibylla, Princess of Jerusalem	
2006	Casino Royale	Vesper Lynd	
2007	The Golden Compass	Serafina Pekkala	
2008	Franklyn	Emilia Bryant / Sally	
2009	Cracks	Miss G	
2010	Womb	Rebecca	
2011	Perfect Sense	Susan	
2012	Dark Shadows	Angelique Bouchard	
2014	White Bird in a Blizzard	Eve Connors	
2014	300: Rise of an Empire	Artemisia	
2014	The Salvation	Madelaine	
2014	Sin City: A Dame to Kill For	Ava Lord	
2016	Miss Peregrine's Home for Peculiar Children	Miss Alma Peregrine	
2017	Based on a True Story	Elle	
2017	Euphoria	Emilie	
2019	Dumbo	Colette Marchant	
2019	Proxima	Sarah Loreau	
2022	Nocebo	Christine	
2023	The Three Musketeers: D'Artagnan	Milady de Winter	
2023	The Three Musketeers: Milady	Milady de Winter	
2024	Dirty Angels	Jake	
2026	Just Play Dead	Nora Wolfe	
2026	Trees Are Watching	Darya	
2027	Blood on Snow †	Corina Hoffmann	Post-production

=== Television ===
Year	Title	Role	Notes
2011	Camelot	Morgan Pendragon	10 episodes
2014–2016	Penny Dreadful	Vanessa Ives	27 episodes
2020	The Luminaries	Lydia Wells	6 episodes
2023	Liaison	Alison Rowdy	6 episodes
2027	Wednesday	Ophelia Frump	TBA (season 3)

=== Video game ===
Year	Title	Role	Notes
2008	007: Quantum of Solace	Vesper Lynd	Voice

== Awards and nominations ==
Association	Year	Category	Work	Result	Ref(s)
British Academy Film Awards	2007	Rising Star Award	—N/a	Won	
César Awards	2020	Best Actress	Proxima	Nominated	
Chlotrudis Awards	2015	Best Supporting Actress	White Bird in a Blizzard	Nominated	
Critics' Choice Television Awards	2015	Best Actress in a Drama Series	Penny Dreadful	Nominated	
Critics' Choice Television Awards	2016	Best Actress in a Drama Series	Penny Dreadful	Nominated	
Empire Awards	2007	Best Female Newcomer	Casino Royale	Won	
European Film Awards	2004	Jameson People's Choice Award for Best Actress	The Dreamers	Nominated	
Fangoria Chainsaw Awards	2015	Best TV Actress	Penny Dreadful	Nominated	
Fangoria Chainsaw Awards	2016	Best TV Actress	Penny Dreadful	Won	
Fangoria Chainsaw Awards	2017	Best TV Actress	Penny Dreadful	Nominated	
Golden Globe Awards	2016	Best Actress in a Television Series – Drama	Penny Dreadful	Nominated	
IFTA Film & Drama Awards	2007	Best International Actress – People's Choice	Casino Royale	Nominated	
Lumière Awards	2020	Best Actress	Proxima	Nominated	
National Movie Awards	2007	Best Female Performance	Casino Royale	Nominated	
Satellite Awards	2015	Best Actress in a Television Series – Drama	Penny Dreadful	Nominated	
Saturn Awards	2007	Best Supporting Actress	Casino Royale	Nominated	
Teen Choice Awards	2005	Choice Movie: Liplock (shared with Orlando Bloom)	Kingdom of Heaven	Nominated	
Teen Choice Awards	2005	Choice Movie: Love Scene (shared with Orlando Bloom)	Kingdom of Heaven	Nominated	
Teen Choice Awards	2017	Choice Movie: Fantasy Actress	Miss Peregrine's Home for Peculiar Children	Nominated	
