= Haparanda =

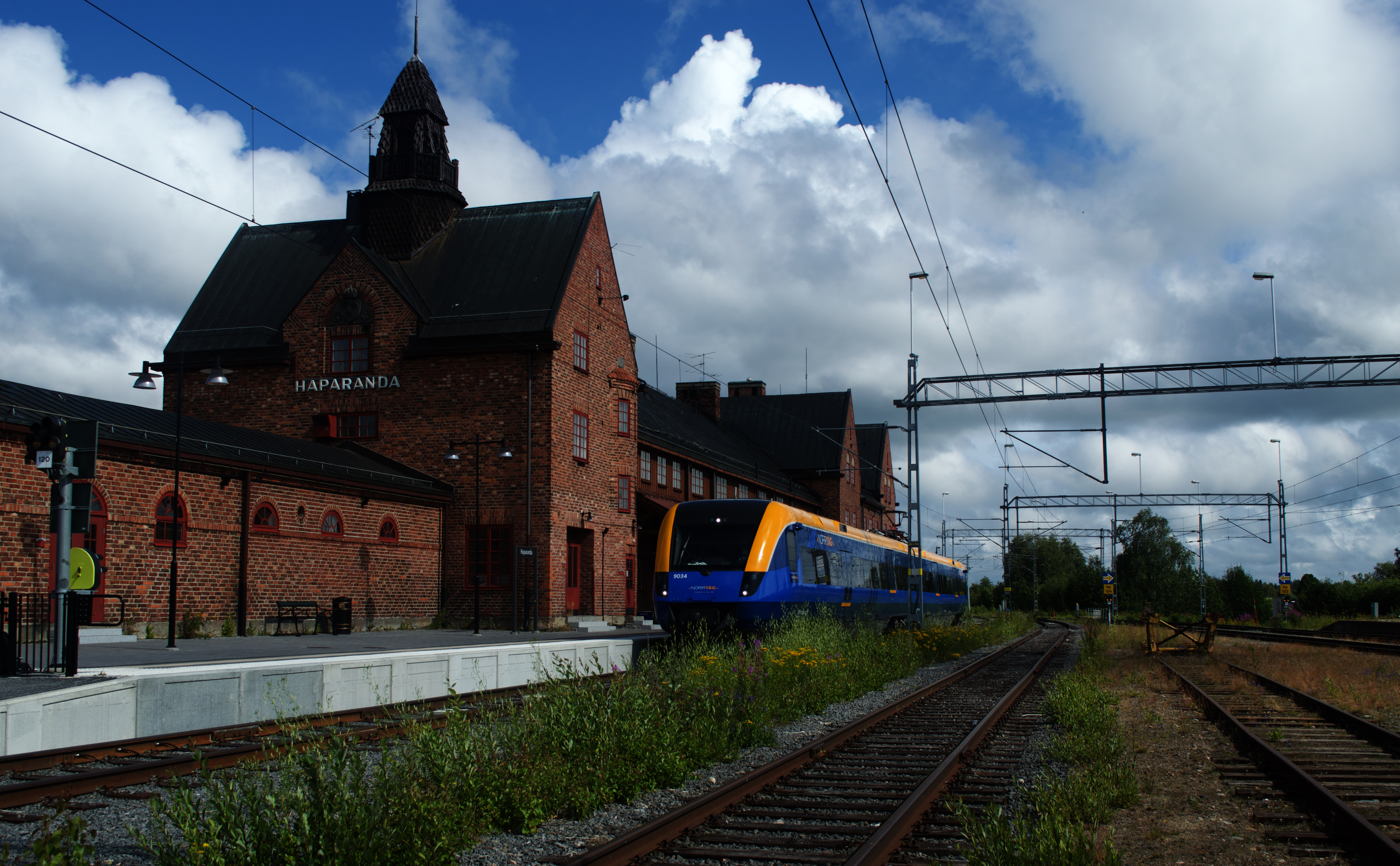
- Haparanda railway station

- Location within Norrbotten Location within Sweden
- Coordinates: 65°50′N 024°08′E
- Country: Sweden
- Province: Norrbotten
- County: Norrbotten County
- Municipality: Haparanda Municipality

Area
  - Total: 4.43 km^{2} (1.71 sq mi)

Population (31 December 2010)
  - Total: 4,856
  - Density: 1,097/km^{2} (2,840/sq mi)
- Time zone: UTC+1 (CET)
  - Summer (DST): UTC+2 (CEST)

Haparanda (Swedish: [hapaˈrǎnːda]; Meänkieli and Finnish: Haaparanta, lit. 'aspen shore or bank') is a locality and the seat of Haparanda Municipality in Norrbotten County, Sweden. It is adjacent to Tornio, Finland. Haparanda has a population of 9,166 inhabitants (2024).

Haparanda is located near the Sweden-Finland border, at the northerly extreme of the Swedish coastline, as well as the easternmost point in Sweden, far removed from large cities. Its summers are very warm for a coastal location so far north, and winters are normally not extremely cold in spite of the relative proximity to the Arctic Circle.

As a twin city, Haparanda has strong connections to Tornio and the Finnish side of the river and bilingualism of Swedish and Finnish is common although Swedish is the sole official language and the mother tongue of a vast majority of inhabitants. In 2010, it was estimated that 70% of Haparanda's inhabitants spoke Finnish as a second language.

Haparanda, for historical reasons, is often still referred to as a "city" despite its small population, although Statistics Sweden only counts localities with more than 10,000 inhabitants as cities. The municipality itself, on the other hand, uses the term Haparanda stad (City of Haparanda) not only for the town itself, but for its whole territory (927 km^{2} or 358 sq mi). At 24° 8' E, Haparanda is Sweden's easternmost settlement.

== History ==
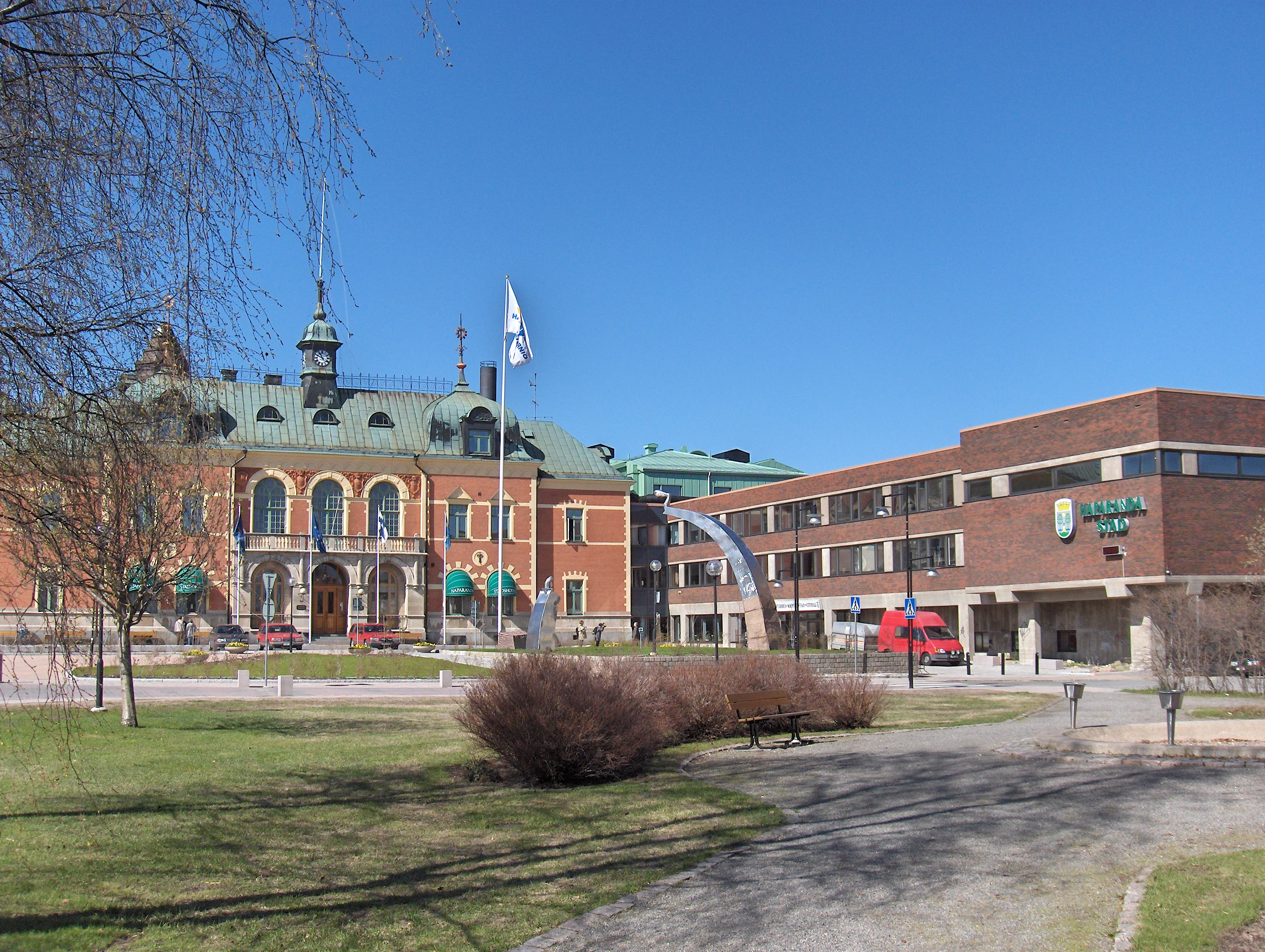
Haparanda Hotel (left) and City Hall (right)

When Sweden ceded Finland to Russia in 1809, the Finnish–Swedish border was drawn along the Rivers Tornio and Muonio. The town of Tornio, located on the island Suensaari in the river delta, became part of the Grand Duchy of Finland within the Russian Empire as demanded by czar Alexander I. (Finland declared independence in 1917.)

At that time the town of Tornio was dominated by Swedish-speaking merchants and craftsmen, forming a linguistic island in a Finnish-speaking countryside. After the war many of the Swedes started to develop the small village of Haaparanta across the border instead (Haparanda and Tornio are within walking distance), eventually leaving Tornio unilingually Finnish. Haparanda was made a market town (köping) in 1821 and received its city charter in 1842.

Into the early twentieth century Haparanda enjoyed commercial and political significance out of proportion to its size because of its position at the mouth of the Torne river at the head of the Gulf of Bothnia. Timber and furs from across northern Scandinavia and Russia arrived by water for shipping on to the rest of the world via the Baltic. Arctic and Antarctic expeditions of the 19th and 20th centuries, including that of Admiral Peary of the US, wore furs supplied by Hermansons, whose shop still stands in Haparanda. Haparanda was the only open railway border crossing at the border to Russia during World War I, and was used by Lenin on the journey by which he returned from exile.

== Sports ==
Haparanda/Tornio play in the second tier bandy division in Sweden, allsvenskan. Haparanda hosted matches in the Bandy World Championship 2001.

Other sports clubs located in Haparanda include:

- Asplöven HC (ice hockey)
- Haparanda FF (football)

== The impact of the Finland-Sweden international border ==
Relations between the neighbouring towns have always been friendly. A large portion of Haparanda's population speak both Swedish and Finnish. Today the two towns are closely interconnected economically and socially; they constitute a transborder conurbation marketed as "EuroCity". Since Sweden and Finland are in different time zones, Haparanda is one hour behind Tornio. This allows a unique spectacle on New Year's Eve, when people can welcome the arriving year twice. Since 2005 the cities have rebranded themselves as "Haparanda-Tornio" in Sweden, and "Tornio-Haparanda" in Finland.

In 2020 and 2021, this interconnectedness has experienced economic interruptions due to the COVID-19 pandemic and the differing national responses in Sweden and Finland. Sweden has generally speaking implemented slightly laxer restrictions while Finland has closed borders and slightly stronger restrictions. Some Swedes have also experienced prejudice on the Finnish side of the border, by Finns, due to the worsening pandemic situation in Sweden.

Haparanda has a railway station, which is served by three trains per day on weekdays. The line was closed to passenger trains between 1992 and 2021, when passenger services restarted. This was the only route open between Russia and Germany in World War I, and during World War II many of the approximately 80,000 Finnish children evacuated to Sweden entered the country here.

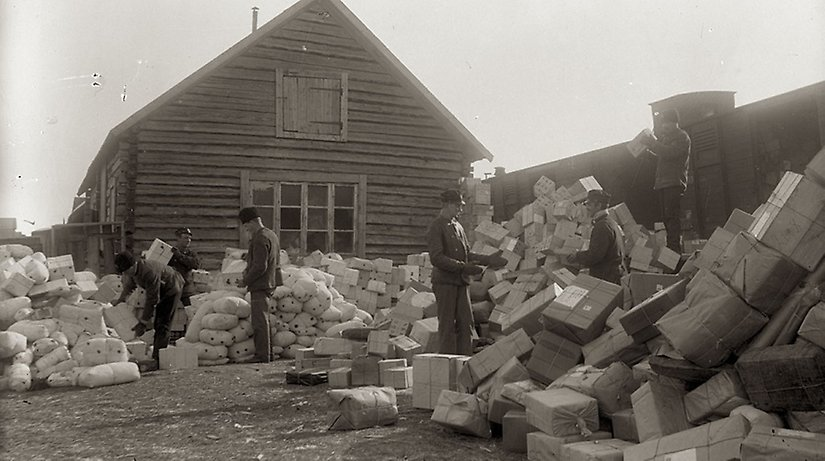
Karungi Overseas post sorting was established in December 1914. Photo: Mia Green

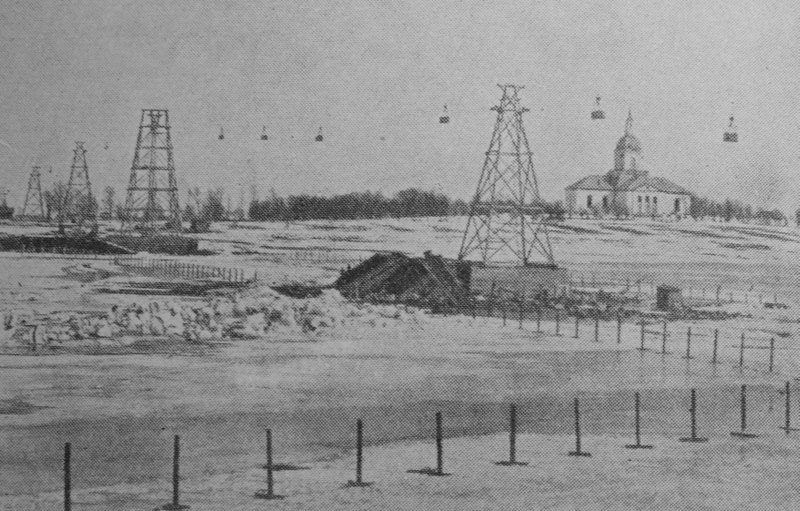
A ropeway conveyor was built across the river 1916-1917 to transfer the mail before the railway bridge.

75,000 WWI prisoners of war were exchanged between the warring sides and 27,000,000 kg of mail, mostly from or to prisoners of war, was sorted at Haparanda.

The nearest airports are both located on the opposite sides of the Sweden-Finland border:

- Kemi-Torneå airport, is located 23 km away east of Haparanda. The airport provides direct routes to Finland's capital Helsinki and Kokkola operated by Finnair.
- Luleå Airport, located 130 km west of Haparanda. The airport provides direct routes to Sweden's capital Stockholm and Gothenburg which are operated by Scandinavian Airlines and also to some European destinations.

== Rail gauge ==
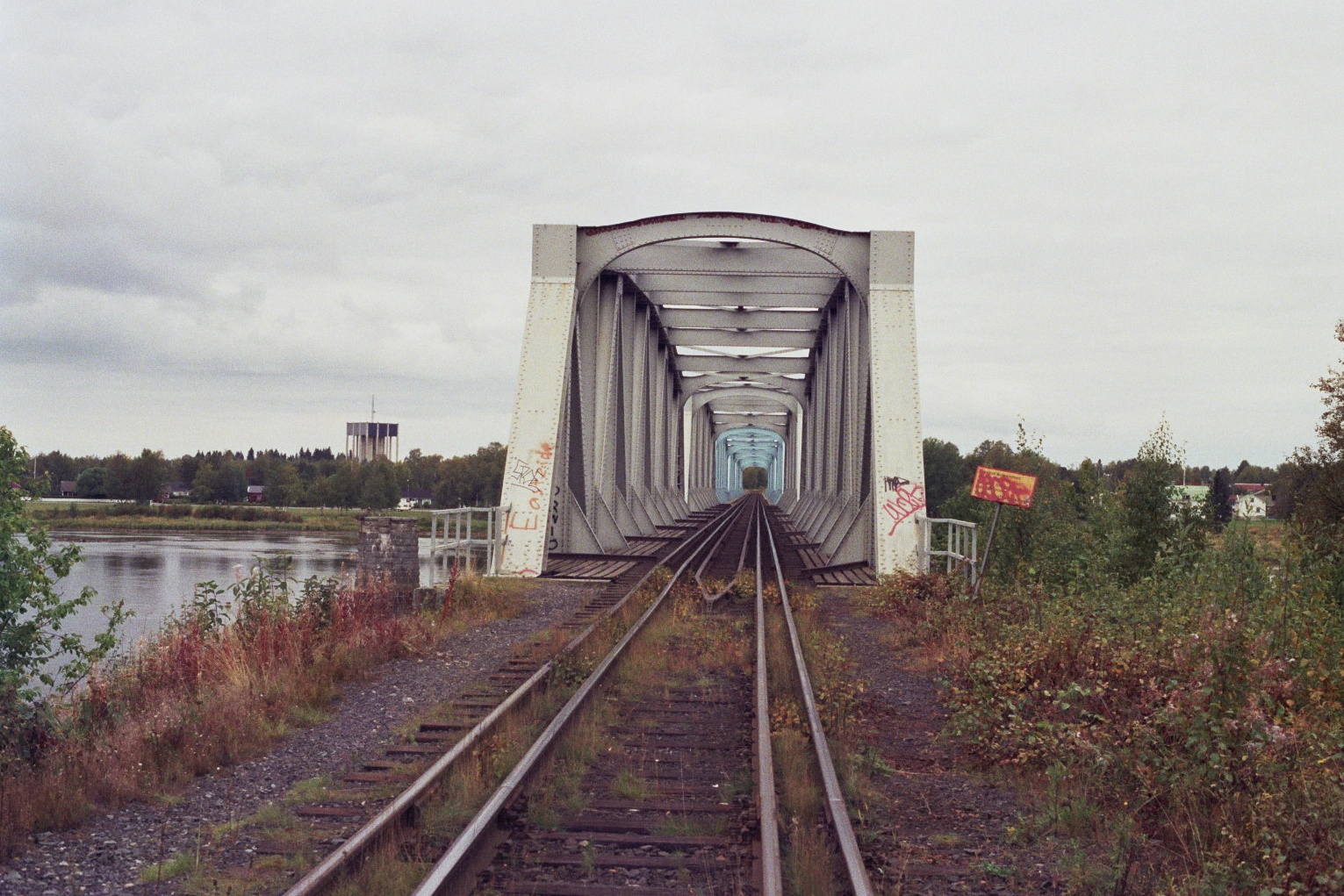
The bridge over Torne River with dual gauge tracks.

Haparanda is connected to the Swedish national network by the Haparandabanan (Haparanda railway). The bridge between Haparanda and Tornio is the only direct connection between the Swedish and Finnish rail systems. The two networks use different track gauges, requiring all freight wagons crossing the border to have their cargo reloaded or their bogies exchanged. Between Haparanda and Tornio there is a dual gauge track, with Swedish 1,435 mm (4 ft 8 1/2 in) and Finnish 1,524 mm (5 ft), in a four-rail gauntlet track formation.

== Buildings ==
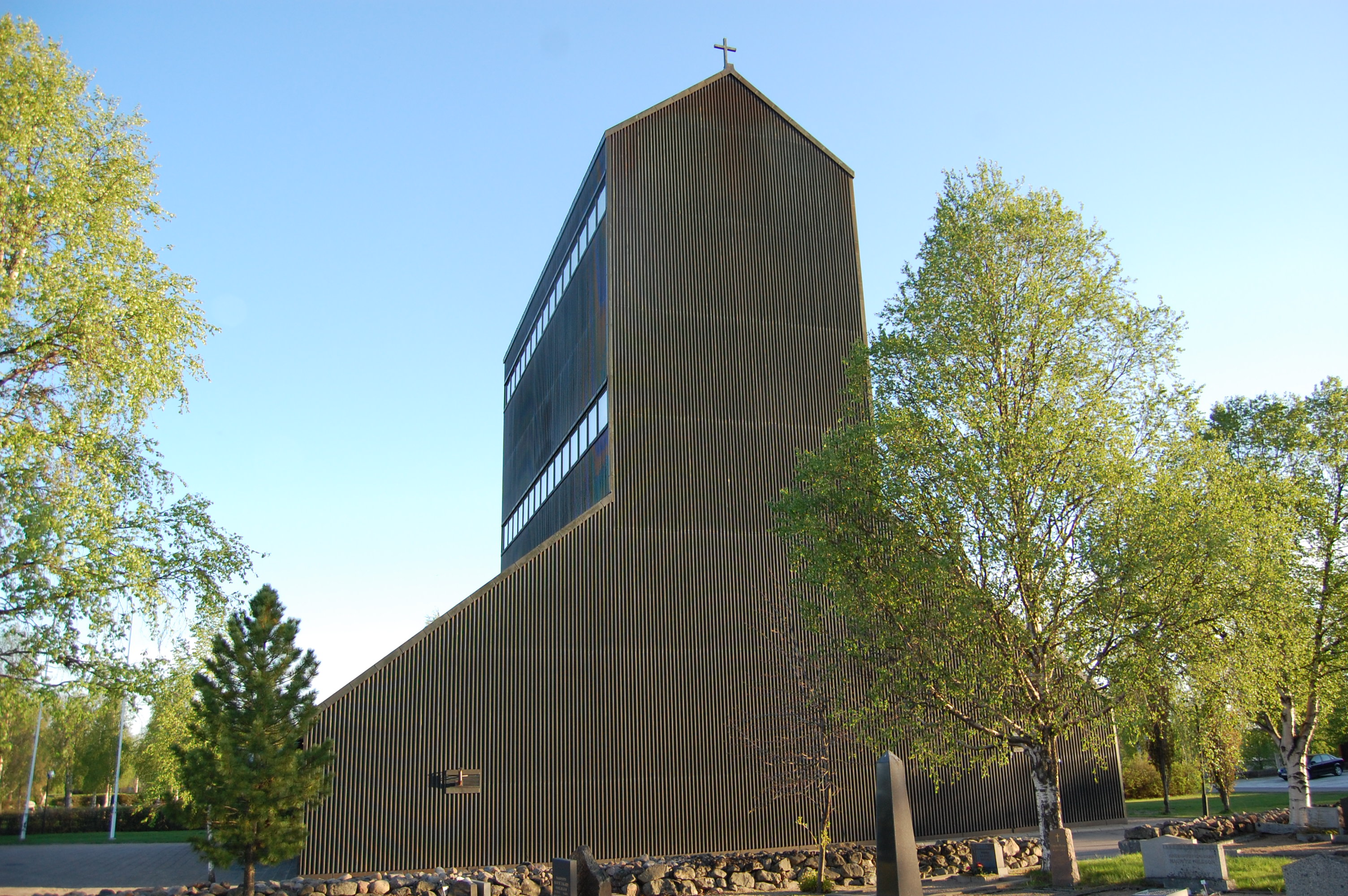
Haparanda Church, built 1967

An IKEA retail store opened 15 November 2006 in a new commercial enterprise zone at the Haparanda-Tornio border, and is the northernmost IKEA store in the world. Though goods are priced in Swedish kronor only, instore signage is in both Swedish and Finnish. This single store attracts a claimed two million visitors every year, and has triggered "piggy-back" development of other large-scale retail outlets and a prototypical US-style shopping mall on the site. Although shops in Haparanda itself accept euros and Swedish kronor, many have closed in the face of competition from the out of town development.

Notable buildings besides the rail station (1918) include the Haparanda Stadshotell (hotel and former town hall) of 1900, which has a first floor stateroom with magnificent chandeliers of Orrefors glass, and the landmark pepperpot-shaped watertower, erected in 1920. It no longer provides all the town's water, only the communal hot water supply. Haparanda's uncompromisingly modern church is by Bengt Larsson of the ELLT studio, and dates from 1967, its predecessor being destroyed by fire in 1964.

Plans for a new building containing a multipurpose arena seating 2,500 and more commercial development were announced in 2013. It will be sited on the border. Construction started in 2016 with a planned completion date in 2018.

== Climate ==
Haparanda has a subarctic climate courtesy of its northerly position, but in spite of this classification the climate is often quite mild. The marine airflow from the mild North Atlantic tempers winters in spite of the low sun, whilst Haparanda retains enough continental influence for summers to be relatively warm, especially for a coastal city so far north. This is due to the large landmass surrounding the city in most directions as well as the brief midnight sun that normally lasts around 10 days. During summer, daylight is prevalent enough to allow daytime activities around the clock for a longer period than that. During the winter solstice however, Haparanda only experiences 2 hours and 56 minutes of daylight.

Daytime temperature average ranges normally goes between 20 °C (68 °F) in summer to −6 °C (21 °F) in winter, with winters being milder than many continental climates. Due to summer temperatures rapidly dropping once daylight diminishes, Haparanda does not reach such a classification.

Climate data for Haparanda (2002–2020; extremes since 1901)
Month	Jan	Feb	Mar	Apr	May	Jun	Jul	Aug	Sep	Oct	Nov	Dec	Year
Record high °C (°F)	8.4 (47.1)	8.0 (46.4)	11.8 (53.2)	18.5 (65.3)	28.8 (83.8)	31.4 (88.5)	33.6 (92.5)	31.1 (88.0)	24.0 (75.2)	17.0 (62.6)	11.5 (52.7)	7.2 (45.0)	33.6 (92.5)
Mean maximum °C (°F)	2.5 (36.5)	3.4 (38.1)	7.5 (45.5)	12.7 (54.9)	22.3 (72.1)	25.2 (77.4)	27.1 (80.8)	24.6 (76.3)	18.7 (65.7)	11.8 (53.2)	6.4 (43.5)	3.7 (38.7)	28.1 (82.6)
Mean daily maximum °C (°F)	−5.9 (21.4)	−5.1 (22.8)	−0.3 (31.5)	5.4 (41.7)	12.3 (54.1)	17.8 (64.0)	21.1 (70.0)	18.7 (65.7)	13.3 (55.9)	5.6 (42.1)	0.4 (32.7)	−2.4 (27.7)	6.7 (44.1)
Daily mean °C (°F)	−9.8 (14.4)	−9.1 (15.6)	−4.9 (23.2)	1.1 (34.0)	7.4 (45.3)	12.9 (55.2)	16.5 (61.7)	14.4 (57.9)	9.4 (48.9)	2.4 (36.3)	−2.4 (27.7)	−5.8 (21.6)	2.7 (36.8)
Mean daily minimum °C (°F)	−13.6 (7.5)	−13.1 (8.4)	−9.5 (14.9)	−3.3 (26.1)	2.5 (36.5)	8.0 (46.4)	11.8 (53.2)	10.1 (50.2)	5.5 (41.9)	−0.8 (30.6)	−5.1 (22.8)	−9.1 (15.6)	−1.4 (29.5)
Mean minimum °C (°F)	−27.6 (−17.7)	−27.3 (−17.1)	−22.3 (−8.1)	−12.1 (10.2)	−4.3 (24.3)	1.8 (35.2)	5.3 (41.5)	2.0 (35.6)	−2.5 (27.5)	−10.1 (13.8)	−16.0 (3.2)	−21.5 (−6.7)	−29.7 (−21.5)
Record low °C (°F)	−40.8 (−41.4)	−41.7 (−43.1)	−37.5 (−35.5)	−26.0 (−14.8)	−10.5 (13.1)	−1.5 (29.3)	2.2 (36.0)	−1.8 (28.8)	−8.1 (17.4)	−23.0 (−9.4)	−32.3 (−26.1)	−37.3 (−35.1)	−41.7 (−43.1)
Average precipitation mm (inches)	56.5 (2.22)	44.9 (1.77)	35.8 (1.41)	32.4 (1.28)	45.5 (1.79)	52.8 (2.08)	60.7 (2.39)	57.2 (2.25)	64.8 (2.55)	59.2 (2.33)	68.9 (2.71)	63.6 (2.50)	642.3 (25.28)
Average extreme snow depth cm (inches)	47 (19)	67 (26)	76 (30)	62 (24)	7 (2.8)	0 (0)	0 (0)	0 (0)	0 (0)	4 (1.6)	13 (5.1)	26 (10)	77 (30)
Source 1: SMHI Open Data
Source 2: SMHI Monthly Data

== Notable people ==
- Mia Green died here in 1949. She was a photographer who had documented the town's role in history. She is also the great-grandmother of actress Eva Green.
- Pär Hulkoff (born 1980), founder and frontman for Industrial metal band Raubtier and his solo project "Hulkoff"
- Tomas Johansson, world champion in wrestling
- Ida Karkiainen, Minister for Public Administration and Minister for Consumer Affairs, 2021–2022
- Sigrid Fridman, sculptor

See also Category:People from Haparanda Municipality

== See also ==
- Free Trade Party of Norrbotten
- Övertorneå
