= Kittie discography =

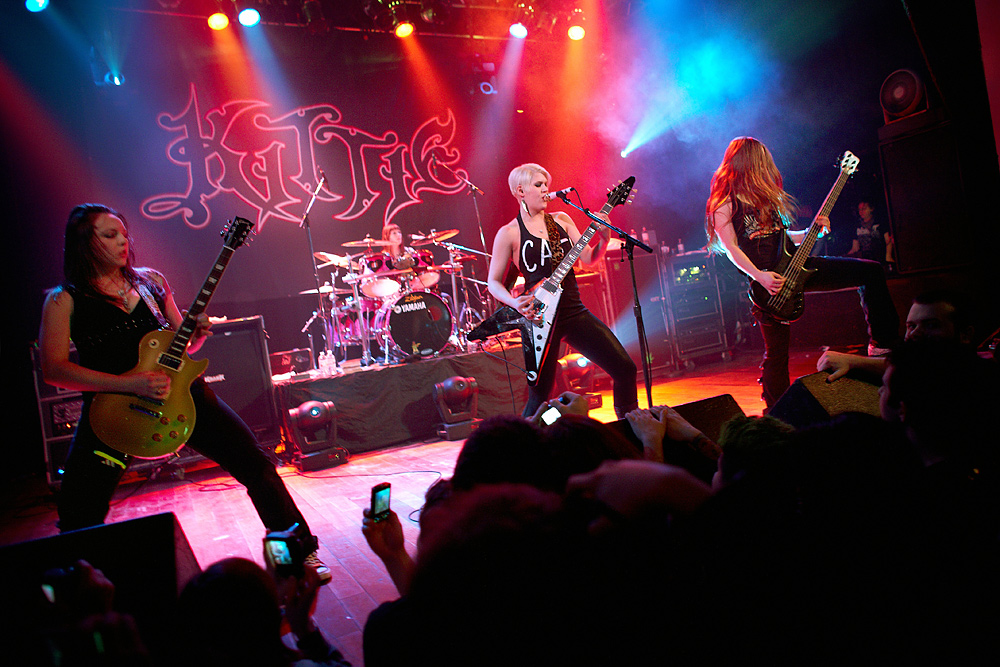
- Kittie performing at the Opera House in Toronto in 2010
- Studio albums: 7
- Extended plays: 6
- Demo albums: 1
- Compilation albums: 1
- Singles: 18
- Video albums: 4
- Music videos: 22

The Canadian heavy metal band Kittie have released seven studio albums, six extended plays, one compilation album, one demo album, four video albums, eighteen singles and twenty-two music videos. Kittie was formed in 1996 by guitarist and vocalist Morgan Lander, guitarist Fallon Bowman and drummer Mercedes Lander, and currently consists of Morgan, Mercedes, guitarist Tara McLeod and bassist Ivy Vujic. Kittie are estimated to have sold over one million albums worldwide, and have achieved most of its commercial successes in the United States, with their album sales in Canada totalling 60,000 as of 2009.

In 1998, Kittie recorded their first demo, Sexizhell. In 1999, they released their self-titled debut extended play and signed to Ng Records after performing at the Canadian Music Week festival in March of that year. The band released their debut album Spit in November 1999; shortly thereafter, Ng was absorbed into Artemis Records, who reissued the album in January 2000. The album peaked at number 79 on the US Billboard 200 chart, whilst both of its singles, "Brackish" and "Charlotte", charted within the top forty of Billboard's Active Rock Tracks chart and the top 75 of the UK Singles Chart. It went on to sell over 600,000 in the United States and was certified Gold by the Recording Industry Association of America (RIAA). Kittie's second album Oracle (2001) earned the band its highest charting positions worldwide, debuting at number 57 on the Billboard 200 with 33,000 copies sold, although its sales fell below those of Spit with 220,000 copies sold in the United States by 2004. Their third album, Until the End (2004), debuted at number 105 on the Billboard 200. Its only single, "Into the Darkness", reached number 116 on the UK Singles Chart.

In 2005, Kittie left Artemis Records and partnered with Rock Ridge Music to release the band's fourth EP Never Again (2006). That same year, Kittie formed its own record label, X of Infamy Records, to release its fourth album Funeral for Yesterday (2007). The album debuted at number 101 on the Billboard 200 and spawned the band's biggest radio hit up to that point, "Funeral for Yesterday", which charted at number 40 on the Billboard Mainstream Rock Tracks chart. In 2009, Kittie signed a three-album deal with eOne Music to release In the Black (2009), alongside a European licensing deal with Massacre Records. The album charted at number 133 on the Billboard 200. The band's sixth album, I've Failed You (2011), was their lowest-charting album in the United States, debuting at number 178 on the Billboard 200. In 2012, Kittie released its first compilation album Not So... Safe, which featured tracks from most of the band's six albums. Due to rising costs associated with touring and writing new music and declining interest in the band's live shows, (Note: Kittie's hiatus For rising costs, see: For declining interest, see:) Kittie entered a hiatus that lasted from 2017 to 2022. In 2024, the band released its seventh album and first in thirteen years, Fire, through Sumerian Records. Its second single, "We Are Shadows", became the band's highest-charting song on the Billboard Mainstream Rock Airplay chart, peaking at number 20.

== Albums ==
=== Studio albums ===
List of studio albums, with selected chart positions
| Title | Album details | Peak chart positions | | | | | | Sales | Certifications |
| Title | Album details | CAN | GER | UK | US | US Ind. | US Rock | Sales | Certifications |
|---|---|---|---|---|---|---|---|---|---|
| Spit | Released: November 13, 1999; Label: Ng/Artemis; Formats: CD, CS, LP, digital download | 75 | — | — | 79 | 2 | — | CAN: 40,000+; EU: 100,000+; US: 660,000+ | RIAA: Gold |
| Oracle | Released: November 12, 2001; Label: Artemis; Formats: CD, CS, LP, digital download | 66 | 91 | 121 | 57 | 3 | — | US: 220,000+ | |
| Until the End | Released: July 26, 2004; Label: Artemis; Formats: CD, LP, digital download | — | — | — (Note: Although Until the End did not enter the UK Albums Chart, it peaked at number 34 on the UK Independent Albums Chart.) | 105 | 4 | — | | |
| Funeral for Yesterday | Released: February 20, 2007; Label: X of Infamy/MRV; Formats: CD+DVD, digital download | — | — | — | 101 | 7 | — | US: 20,000 | |
| In the Black | Released: September 15, 2009; Label: eOne; Formats: CD, LP, digital download | — | — | — | 133 | 23 | — | | |
| I've Failed You | Released: August 30, 2011; Label: eOne; Formats: CD, digital download | — | — | — | 178 | 26 | 46 | | |
| Fire | Released: June 21, 2024; Label: Sumerian; Formats: CD, CS, LP, digital download | — | — | — (Note: Although Fire did not enter the UK Albums Chart, it reached numbers 72 and 71 on the UK Albums Sales Chart and Physical Albums Chart, respectively.) | — (Note: Although Fire did not enter the Billboard 200, it reached number 20 on the Billboard Top Album Sales chart.) | — | — | | |
"—" denotes a recording that did not chart or was not released in that territory.

=== Compilation albums ===
List of compilation albums
| Title | Album details |
|---|---|
| Not So... Safe | Released: September 11, 2012; Label: eOne; Formats: CD, digital download |

=== Demo albums ===
List of demo albums
| Title | Album details |
|---|---|
| Sexizhell | Released: 1998; Formats: CS |

=== Video albums ===
List of video albums
| Title | Album details |
|---|---|
| Spit in Your Eye | Released: July 11, 2000; Label: Artemis; Formats: VHS, DVD |
| In the Studio | Released: February 18, 2007; Label: X of Infamy/MRV Music; Formats: Digital download (iTunes) |
| Kittie: Origins/Evolutions | Released: March 30, 2018; Label: Lightyear Entertainment/Caroline; Formats: CD, LP, DVD, Blu-Ray, digital download |
| Kittie: Live at the London Music Hall | Released: March 26, 2019; Label: Pyre Productions, Creative Dynamic; Formats: DVD, Blu-ray, digital download |

== Extended plays ==
List of extended plays, with selected chart positions
| Title | EP details | Peak chart positions |
| Title | EP details | US Ind. |
|---|---|---|
| Kittie | Released: 1999; Formats: CD | — |
| Paperdoll | Released: December 12, 2000; Label: Artemis; Formats: CD | 22 |
| Safe | Released: November 19, 2002; Label: Artemis; Formats: CD | — |
| Never Again | Released: February 7, 2006; Label: Rock Ridge; Formats: Digital download | — |
| Spit XXV | Released: September 19, 2025; Label: Sumerian; Format: LP, digital download | — |
| Oracle XXV | Released: November 13, 2026; Label: Sumerian; Format: Digital download | — |
"—" denotes a recording that did not chart or was not released in that territory.

== Singles ==
List of singles, with selected chart positions, showing year released and album name
| Title | Year | Peak chart positions | | | Album |
| Title | Year | US Main. Rock | US Active Rock | UK | Album |
|---|---|---|---|---|---|
| "Brackish" | 2000 | — | 31 | 46 | Spit |
| "Charlotte" | 2000 | — | 35 | 60 | Spit |
| "What I Always Wanted" | 2001 | — | 36 | — | Oracle |
| "Run Like Hell" | 2002 | — | — | — | Oracle |
| "In Winter" | 2002 | — | — | — | Oracle |
| "Into the Darkness" | 2004 | — | — | 116 | Until the End |
| "Funeral for Yesterday" | 2007 | 40 | 37 | — | Funeral for Yesterday |
| "Breathe" | 2007 | — | — | — | Funeral for Yesterday |
| "My Plague" | 2009 | — | — | — | In The Black |
| "Cut Throat" | 2009 | — | — | — | In The Black |
| "Sorrow I Know" | 2009 | — | — | — | In The Black |
| "We Are the Lamb" | 2011 | — | — | — | I've Failed You |
| "Empires, Pt. 2" | 2011 | — | — | — | I've Failed You |
| "Eyes Wide Open" | 2024 | — | x | — | Fire |
| "We Are Shadows" | 2024 | 20 | x | — | Fire |
| "Vultures" | 2024 | — | x | — | Fire |
| "One Foot in the Grave" | 2024 | — | x | — | Fire |
| "Spit XXV" | 2025 | — | x | — | Spit XXV |
"—" denotes a recording that did not chart or was not released in that territory. "x" denotes a chart that did not exist when the song was charting, either from not being launched yet or being discontinued.

== Other appearances ==
List of non-single guest appearances, showing year released and album name
| Title | Year | Album |
|---|---|---|
| "Fantasies" | 2011 | Take It or Leave It – A Tribute to the Queens of Noise: The Runaways |
| "Space Oddity" | 2015 | A Salute to The Thin White Duke: The Songs of David Bowie |
| "The Unforgiven" (Kittie, Diamante and The Pretty Wild) | 2025 | Queen of the Ring – Music from the Motion Picture |

== Music videos ==
List of music videos, showing year released and director
| Title | Year | Director(s) |
|---|---|---|
| "Brackish" | 2000 | Candave Corelli, Juli Berg |
| "Charlotte" | 2000 | Lisa Rubish |
| "What I Always Wanted" | 2001 | Thomas Mignone |
| "Pain" (Live video) | 2001 | Unknown |
| "Run Like Hell" (Live video) | 2001 | Unknown |
| "Into the Darkness" | 2004 | Greg Kaplan, Rafaela Monfradini |
| "This Too Shall Pass" (Live video) | 2006 | Brett Novak |
| "Funeral for Yesterday" | 2007 | Vincent Giordano |
| "Cut Throat" | 2009 | David Brodsky |
| "Sorrow I Know" | 2010 | David Brodsky |
| "Die My Darling" | 2010 | John Barber |
| "My Plague" (Live video)" | 2011 | Unknown |
| "We Are the Lamb" | 2011 | Unknown |
| "Empires, Pt. 2" | 2011 | Unknown |
| "Eyes Wide Open" | 2024 | Unknown |
| "We Are Shadows" | 2024 | Unknown |
| "Vultures" | 2024 | Edwin Daboub |
| "One Foot in the Grave" | 2024 | Unknown |
| "Fire" | 2024 | Unknown |
| "Spit XXV" | 2025 | William Flech |
| "Do You Think I'm a Whore? XXV" | 2025 | William Flech |
| "Mouthful of Poison XXV" | 2026 | William Flech |
