= Until the End (Kittie album) =

Studio album by Kittie
- Released: July 26, 2004
- Recorded: March 2004
- Studios: Long View Farm (North Brookfield, Massachusetts)
- Genres: Death metal; heavy metal; thrash metal
- Length: 41:20
- Label: Artemis
- Producer: Steve Thompson

Kittie chronology
Safe (2002)	Until the End (2004)	Never Again (2006)

Singles from Until the End
- 1. "Into the Darkness" Released: June 29, 2004

Until the End is the third studio album by Canadian heavy metal band Kittie, released on July 26, 2004, through Artemis Records. It was their only album with bassist Jennifer Arroyo, who joined the band in March 2002. The album was recorded in March 2004 with producer Steve Thompson at Long View Farm Studios in North Brookfield, Massachusetts. Musically, it continued Kittie's transition away from their early nu metal sound, whilst placing a heavier emphasis on melody than on their previous two albums. Kittie wrote the album while they were engaged in a lawsuit with Artemis, and its lyrics and artwork reflect the band's feelings of frustration and uncertainty during that period. After recording concluded, Kittie recruited guitarist Lisa Marx for a tour in support of the album.

Until the End received mixed reviews from critics, who were divided over its maturity and progression from Kittie's earlier output. The album sold 19,000 copies in its first week and peaked at number 105 on the US Billboard 200 chart and its only single, "Into the Darkness", reached number 116 on the UK Singles Chart. After two promotional tours in support of the album, financial difficulties caused by a lack of touring support from Artemis led to the departures of Arroyo and Marx from Kittie in February 2005; the following month, the band parted ways with the label and went on hiatus.

== Background ==
In November 2001, Kittie released their second studio album, Oracle. On March 18, 2002, following a tour of Europe in support of the album, bassist Talena Atfield left the band. Jennifer Arroyo, formerly of the rap metal band Spine, joined Kittie two days later, making her live debut with the band in Manchester, New Hampshire, on March 29, 2002. Arroyo first met Kittie vocalist and guitarist Morgan Lander and drummer Mercedes Lander in 2000, when both of their bands performed on Farmclub.com. Morgan and Mercedes felt that Arroyo brought a "a new element" to Kittie with her technical and melodic playing style; during the band's subsequent live performances, they would let her play improvised bass solos to show off her abilities. The band continued to tour until February 2003.

On April 1, 2003, Kittie filed a lawsuit against its record label, Artemis Records, and its parent company, Sheridan Square Entertainment, claiming that the label owed them unpaid royalties. The lawsuit prevented Kittie from recording a new album, and the band members were unsure if they would stay together through the end of the lawsuit. To cope with the uncertainty, they began working on new material. Morgan wrote most of Until the End's guitar riffs, lyrics and melodies, with Mercedes and Arroyo contributing some additional arrangements and their own drum tracks and basslines to the album, respectively. Kittie performed several shows in June and July 2003, before embarking on their Kiss of Infamy Tour with Motograter and 40 Below Summer, from October 18 to December 1, 2003. On both tours, the band debuted six new songs; "Look So Pretty", "Career Suicide", "Until the End", "Pussy Sugar", "Burning Bridges", and "Loveless". Mercedes said that playing their new songs helped them mature and made the band more comfortable recording them.

== Recording and production ==
On March 1, 2004, it was announced that Kittie and Artemis Records had settled the lawsuit. According to Morgan, the band decided to settle after realizing it would take too long to resolve and ultimately be of no benefit to them, even if they won. The band subsequently commenced recording their third album at Long View Farm Studios in North Brookfield, Massachusetts with producer Steve Thompson, marking the first time the band had recorded outside of their hometown of London, Ontario. Recording lasted three weeks, with the band working for almost twelve hours a day in the studio. Morgan said that Kittie chose to record at Long View Farm because of its isolated nature and facilities, allowing the band to focus solely on recording; according to Mercedes, they left the studio three or four times at most during the recording process. The band spent little time doing pre-production, as they had finished writing and arranging all of their songs before they went in to record them. The basic guitar, bass and drum tracks for Until the End were done in the first week of recording; Mercedes' drums were tracked in the span of three days. The following week, Morgan finished recording her vocals.

Until the End was recorded onto two-inch analogue tape, with minimal digital editing or overdubs. (Note: Mercedes said that the only time digital editing was used on Until the End was to replace a missed drum hit on "Daughters Down".) No click tracks were used. Morgan said that Thompson's approach to recording was "more to focus on the song itself" and develop its own individual sound and personality; he and the band would spend time attempting to get specific guitar tones and sounds, sometimes by experimenting with his array of instruments and pedals, and others by recording in different rooms at the studio. Arroyo and Mercedes recorded their parts in Long View's control room, whilst Morgan was largely situated in an isolated room on the studio's second floor. She said that this reduced the amount of pressure she felt when recording, "[as] I could just sit up there with my amp and focus."

In between recording sessions, Kittie held auditions at Long View Farm for a new, permanent replacement for touring guitarist Jeff Phillips, who had left the band to work full-time with his other band, Thine Eyes Bleed. "We were looking for someone really solid and with something to offer, someone who could hear something and play it right off the bat", Arroyo said. The band tried out six or seven people, including Lisa Marx, formerly of the hardcore band To See You Broken. Kittie first learned of Marx after meeting her bandmates at a Seattle show and Mercedes subsequently reached out to her online. The band liked her personality and their shared sense of humour, and although she was the second or third person to try out, "we really knew it was going to be [her] from the beginning", Morgan said. Artemis Records announced the addition of Marx to Kittie's lineup, as well as Until the End's release date, on April 26, 2004.

== Composition and lyrics ==
It's [the sound of] a band that's starting to understand the balance between heavy and light, and to unite it. It's also a representation of [a] band that is in a lot of trouble, and isn't happy with their situation, and is falling apart.

— Morgan Lander reflecting on Until the End in an interview with the Cleveland Scene (2007)

Until the End has been described as death metal, heavy metal and thrash metal. The album continued Kittie's transition away from their early nu metal sound; journalists Dave Perri and Mark Fisher believed that it marked the point that Kittie became a proper heavy metal band. Placing a heavier emphasis on melody than on their previous albums, it contains heavy riffs, double bass drumming, fluctuating time signatures, and no guitar solos, as well as screamed, growled, snarled and clean vocals. As with Kittie's previous albums, its songs are written in drop C tuning. On "Into the Darkness", Kittie experimented with the use of vocal harmony between screamed and melodic, clean vocals, and with a key change in its last chorus; Morgan felt that it was "the most difficult song [she'd] ever written lyrically and vocally". A "vocal remix" of the song, featured as the album's final track, removes the screamed vocals.

According to Morgan Lander, the lyrics of the songs on Until the End reflect Kittie's feelings of frustration and uncertainty amidst their legal struggles with Artemis Records. They also cover personal experiences, relationships, and human nature. Morgan said that the album's opening track, "Look So Pretty", was an angry response to menacing acts directed towards unspecified others. She also said that "Pussy Sugar" is about "seeing someone you care about go through a dark, unfortunate time" and realizing one's inability to help them. Morgan stated that "In Dreams" is about perceiving herself as going crazy as a result of stress. "Into the Darkness" reflects Kittie's fear of the unknown.

The artwork for Until the End was illustrated by Geoff Mack, from a visual concept by Morgan Lander. Morgan said that the cover represented helplessness, "the end of innocence", and the feeling of "being suffocated and held down", the latter referring to Kittie's struggles with Artemis. Its title refers to Kittie's feelings of perseverance.

== Reception ==
=== Commercial ===
Until the End was released in Europe on July 26, 2004, and in the United States the following day. It sold 19,000 copies in its first week of release, debuting at number 105 on the US Billboard 200 chart and number four on Billboard's Top Independent Albums chart. The album's only single, "Into the Darkness", was released to radio stations on June 29, 2004. It was released as a single in the United Kingdom on August 9, 2004, where it reached number 116 on the UK Singles Chart. Kittie filmed a music video for the song, directed by Greg Kaplan and Rafaela Monfradini, in late May 2004. The video first aired on MTV2's Headbangers Ball on June 19, 2004, and also received rotation on Fuse and Kerrang! TV, with the latter channel selecting it as the "Video of the Week" for August 18 to 24, 2004.

=== Critical ===
Professional ratings
Aggregate scores
Source	Rating
Metacritic	56/100
Review scores
Source	Rating
AllMusic	3.5/5 stars
Blabbermouth.net	5/10
Blender	3/5 stars
Collector's Guide to Heavy Metal	6/10
Kerrang!	4/5 stars
NME	3/10
Now	2/5 stars
Rock Hard	7/10
Spin	B−
Stylus	8/10

On review aggregator website Metacritic, Until the End holds a score of 56 out of 100, based on reviews from seven critics, which indicates "mixed or average reviews". AllMusic reviewer James Christopher Monger praised its heavy composition but noted an "adherence to formulaic modern metal clichés" on some of its later songs. Blabbermouth.net criticised Kittie's "rudimentary songwriting skills" and "mediocre" talents on the album, which they described as a "murk of generic metal". Ox-Fanzine described the album's compositions as "flat as they are superfluous", and stated that Kittie "haven't grown up". Despite finding some "faintly creative moments" on the record, Exclaim!'s Jill Mikkelson commented that the album's main selling point was Kittie's "juvenile riot grrrl attitude". George Smith of The Village Voice dismissed the album as "tenaciously mindless and effortlessly grim", comparing Kittie unfavourably with Slayer, Pungent Stench and Grave and commenting that "other than being a product of women, there's only one reason to recommend [Until the End]: It's marginally better than Auf der Maur".

Rick Skidmore of Westword and Kerrang!'s Nick Ruskell stated that Kittie had made significant improvements to their songwriting on Until the End; the latter said that the band "sounds more like their own ... than the Machine Head-ettes of old". Rock Hard's Jan Jaedike wrote that although the album's sound was not completely removed from Kittie's earlier nu metal output, its songs had "real hit character". Bjorn Randolph of Stylus Magazine argued that Mercedes' tight sense of groove and Morgan's "dual vocal personae" gave Kittie "the swing and the sing" necessary to differentiate themselves from other heavy metal bands. In a mixed review for the Cleveland Scene, D.X. Ferris stated that Morgan's vocals were "dependent on the cheap duality of her demon growl/angel-swoon vocals". NME's Pete Cashmore criticized Kittie's lack of originality and attempts to incorporate "subtlety and nuance" into the thrash metal genre, which he felt was "to the detriment of a style that should always be about brutality and aural punishment".

Retrospective reviews remain mixed. David Perri, writing in The Collector's Guide to Heavy Metal: Volume 4: The '00s (2011), criticized its oft-"clumsy" songwriting and "cheap" production but considered it "a giant leap in the right direction for Kittie". In 2022, MetalSucks called the album Kittie's best, and a "perfect example of an awesome band proving their worth to the worthy after all of the fair-weather fans aimed their attention elsewhere". Conversely, Paul Travers of Metal Hammer ranked it as Kittie's worst in a 2024 ranking of the band's seven albums, stating: "Kittie have never made a terrible album, but Until The End was perhaps their least cohesive."

== Touring and aftermath ==
From July to August 2004, Kittie embarked on a headline tour with supporting acts Candiria, 36 Crazyfists and Twelve Tribes. The band also performed at one of the stops of Roadrunner Records' RoadRage 2004 tour, at the Worcester Palladium in Massachusetts, on August 6, 2004. On August 11, 2004, Mercedes was hospitalized for internal bleeding, caused by a combination of stress and dehydration, prior to a show in Cleveland, Ohio. Consequently, the band cancelled their remaining tour dates. On September 7, 2004, Kittie announced that they would join Otep and Crisis for the Metal Movement Tour from September 27 to November 10, 2004. Kittie formed the tour with the intention of raising awareness for women in heavy metal. On January 15, 2005, the band performed at the Circo Volador concert hall in Mexico City.

Artemis Records offered Kittie limited touring and promotional support for Until the End, forcing Morgan and Mercedes to pay Arroyo, Marx and the band's touring costs with their personal funds. Due to their worsening financial situation, Morgan and Mercedes told Arroyo and Marx after Kittie finished touring that they would not be able to pay them a retainer. Marx was upset by this, and left the band following their tour of Mexico in February 2005. Arroyo left Kittie shortly thereafter to pursue work with her other band, Suicide City, which she felt gave her more room to contribute creatively. Morgan and Mercedes had anticipated Arroyo's departure, and the split was amicable.

Morgan announced Marx and Arroyo's departures through a statement on Kittie's official message board on March 23, 2005, where she blamed Artemis Records' lack of support for the band for their departures. At the time, the band were in contract negotiations with Artemis. A week later, on March 31, 2005, Kittie parted ways with Artemis after the band rejected a proposed amendment to the band's contract with the label, which would have reduced the recording budget of their fourth album. Following this, Morgan and Mercedes put the band on hiatus for six months. (Note: In Kittie: Origins/Evolutions (2017), Mercedes stated that Kittie had quietly disbanded in early 2005. However, Morgan denied that the band had broken up at the time.)

Reflecting on the album in Kittie: Origins/Evolutions (2017), Morgan said:

"Honestly, I like a lot of the songs on Until the End. I don't know [anything] that I regret a lot. Listening back, I kinda maybe wish that we had done things a little bit differently in the studio. Maybe a different producer. Maybe even a different studio. Mind you, ... it was a really fun, awesome recording process. We had a lot of fun, it was a really really great time."

== Track listing ==
All songs written by Morgan Lander.

Standard release
No.	Title	Length
1.	"Look So Pretty"	5:29
2.	"Career Suicide"	3:55
3.	"Until the End"	4:13
4.	"Red Flag"	3:48
5.	"Pussy Sugar"	4:16
6.	"In Dreams"	3:15
7.	"Into the Darkness"	3:38
8.	"Burning Bridges"	3:07
9.	"Loveless"	2:08
10.	"Daughters Down"	3:40
11.	"Into the Darkness" (Vocal Remix)	3:45
Total length:		41:20

Japanese bonus tracks
No.	Title	Length
12.	"Into the Darkness" (Aggro Vocal Verse)	3:45
13.	"Sugar" (Talking Voice Alt.)	4:14
Total length:		49:19

Notes

- Additional arrangements on tracks 1 and 5 by Jennifer Arroyo
- Additional arrangements on tracks 1, 2, 4 to 7 and 11 by Mercedes Lander

== Personnel ==
Personnel per liner notes.

Kittie
- Morgan Lander – guitars, vocals
- Jennifer Arroyo – bass
- Mercedes Lander – drums
- Lisa Marx – live guitar

Artwork

- Geoff Mack – artwork
- Morgan Lander – artwork concept
- Reinhold Scherer – photography
- Brett Weiss – layout design

Production

- Steve Thompson – producer, mixing
- Ian Hatton – engineer
- Devin O'Connell – engineer
- Mike Lapierre – engineer
- Ted Jensen – mastering (at Sterling Sound)
- John Arraya – guitar technician
- John Magnum – drum technician

== Charts ==
Chart performance for Until the End
Chart (2004)	Peak position
UK Independent Albums (OCC)	34
US Billboard 200	105
US Top Independent Albums (Billboard)	4

== Release history ==
Release history for Until the End
Region	Label	Format	Date	Catalog #	Ref.
Europe	Artemis; Rykodisc	CD	July 26, 2004	RCD17017	
United States	Artemis	CD	July 27, 2004	ATM-CD-51538	
Canada	Artemis	CD	July 27, 2004	ATM-CD-51538	
Japan	Columbia Music Entertainment	CD	August 25, 2004	COCB-53244	
Europe	Metal Mind	CD (digipak)	November 24, 2008	MASS CD 1245 DG	
Various	MNRK Music Group	LP	April 22, 2023	MNK-LP-46873	
