= Spit XXV =

EP (re-recorded) by Kittie
- Released: September 19, 2025
- Studio: The Farm (Sunshine Coast)
- Genres: Nu metal; death metal; thrash metal
- Length: 13:03
- Label: Sumerian
- Producer: Garth Richardson

Kittie chronology
Fire (2024)	Spit XXV (2025)	Oracle XXV (2026)

Singles from Spit XXV
- 1. "Spit XXV" Released: August 20, 2025

Spit XXV is the fifth extended play (EP) by the Canadian heavy metal band Kittie, released on September 19, 2025, through Sumerian Records. Conceived to celebrate the 25th anniversary of the band's debut album Spit (1999), the EP consists of re-recordings of four of the album's songs with Kittie's current lineup, featuring vocalist and guitarist Morgan Lander, guitarist Tara McLeod, bassist Ivy Vujic and drummer Mercedes Lander. The band reunited with producer Garth Richardson, who helmed the original album in 1999, and reused much of the same equipment from the original sessions. The EP was promoted with the release of music videos for "Spit XXV" and "Do You Think I'm a Whore? XXV", and received positive reviews from Classic Rock and Metal Hammer.

== Background and recording ==
In November 1999, Kittie released their debut album Spit through Ng and Artemis Records. The album was a commercial success, charting at number 79 on the US Billboard 200 chart and becoming certified Gold by the Recording Industry Association of America (RIAA). In a 2022 interview with MetalSucks, guitarist and vocalist Morgan Lander expressed interest in re-recording Spit for its 25th anniversary, to show how the album's songs would sound with the musicianship of Kittie's current lineup; she cited Taylor Swift's re-recorded albums campaign as an influence. In a 2024 interview with Metal Hammer, Morgan said she could "neither confirm nor deny" plans to re-record the album but expressed continued interest in the idea.

Kittie reunited with Garth Richardson, who originally produced Spit at EMAC Recording Studios in 1999, to record Spit XXV. Recording sessions lasted fourteen days, compared to the original album's nine. The band used the same amplifiers and several pieces of equipment featured on the original album, with the notable exception of Mercedes Lander's drum kit. The EP was mixed by Josh Wilbur, who also mixed Kittie's seventh album Fire (2024). Morgan said Kittie decided to only re-record "Spit", "Charlotte", "Do You Think I'm a Whore?" and "Brackish" as they were still playing those songs live, meaning the way the band performed them had changed over time, and because they believed some of Spit's songs "may not have translated as well with a more modern twist".

== Release and reception ==
Professional ratings
Review scores
Source	Rating
Classic Rock	7/10 marks
Metal Hammer	7/10 marks

After posting teasers and compilations of old footage to their Instagram page, Kittie announced Spit XXV on August 20, 2025, and released the EP's title track as its lead single. A music video for "Do You Think I'm a Whore? XXV" was released on September 18, 2025. Both music videos were directed by William Flech. The EP was released on September 19, 2025, through Sumerian Records. In Metal Hammer, Dannii Leivers praised the re-recorded tracks for "adding even more grit, groove and punch to one of nu metal's landmark albums". Matt Mills of Classic Rock compared the EP's style with Shadows Fall and highlighted "Do You Think I'm a Whore?" for sounding "timelessly heavy", though he felt "Brackish" remained "something of a Coal Chamber freak-out".

== Track listing ==
All tracks are written by Morgan Lander, Mercedes Lander, and Fallon Bowman.

No.	Title	Length
1.	"Spit XXV"	2:45
2.	"Do You Think I'm a Whore? XXV"	3:06
3.	"Brackish XXV"	2:57
4.	"Charlotte XXV"	4:13
Total length:		13:03

== Personnel ==
Credits adapted from liner notes and Tidal.

Kittie
- Morgan Lander - guitar, vocals
- Tara McLeod - guitar
- Ivy Vujic - bass
- Mercedes Lander - drums, vocals

Additional musicians

- Rhys Fulber - additional programming on "Brackish XXV"
Production
- Garth Richardson - production
- Dean Maher - engineering
- Curtis Kondra - assistant engineer
- Josh Wilbur - mixing
- Ted Jensen - mastering

Artwork

- Jim Louvau - cover photo
- Eddie Kepner - layout
- Destiny Keller - layout
