= Charlotte (Kittie song) =

Single by Kittie

from the album Spit
- Released: June 5, 2000
- Recorded: May 1999
- Studio: EMAC Recording Studios
- Genre: Nu metal
- Length: 3:56
- Label: NG; Artemis
- Songwriters: Morgan Lander, Mercedes Lander and Fallon Bowman
- Producer: Garth Richardson

Kittie singles chronology
"Brackish" (2000)	"Charlotte" (2000)	"What I Always Wanted" (2000)

"Charlotte" is a song by the Canadian heavy metal band Kittie, released as the second single from their debut album Spit. The song was inspired by a book about a serial killer that Kittie member Morgan Lander read called Rites of Burial by Tom Jackman and Troy Cole. A music video for the song, which follows an angel who has crashed down and lost his wings, was shot in Toronto and directed by Lisa Rubisch. The music video for "Charlotte" also got played very frequently on MTV. Released in the year 2000, the single for "Charlotte" went to number 60 on the UK Singles Chart. It remains the band’s biggest hit.

== Release and commercial performance ==
"Charlotte" was released a single by Kittie on June 5, 2000. The song went to number 60 on the UK Singles Chart.

== Background ==
"Charlotte" was inspired by a book that Kittie member Morgan Lander read. The book, Rites of Burial by Tom Jackman and Troy Cole, was about a serial killer named Robert Berdella. In an interview with Songfacts.com, Lander said about the serial killer: "He did a lot of really, really messed up things, and the story really stuck with me. I thought it was really quite sad and disturbing. So, it draws lyrical inspiration from that."

== Music video ==
The music video for "Charlotte" was shot in Toronto and directed by Lisa Rubisch. Kittie told MTV News that the band was shooting for something with more of a concept than the "Brackish" music video, but with a performance of the band still being a strong element. The music video, which got played very frequently on MTV, follows an angel who has crashed down and lost his wings.

== Track list ==
1. "Charlotte - Alternate Mellow Version"
2. "Suck - Live"
3. "Spit - Live"
4. "Charlotte - Alge Remix Radio Edit"

== Charts ==
Chart (2000)	Peak position
Scotland (OCC)	58
UK Singles (OCC)	60
US Active Rock (Billboard)	37

== Release history ==
Region	Label	Format	Date	Catalog #	Ref.
United States	NG; Artemis	CD	June 5, 2000	ARTCD-31	
United Kingdom	NG; Artemis; Epic	CD; 7" single	July 2000	669622 7	
