= Fire (Kittie album) =

Studio album by Kittie
- Released: June 21, 2024
- Recorded: November–December 2023
- Studio: Sienna (Nashville); Rock Falcon (Brentwood)
- Genre: Heavy metal; groove metal
- Length: 35:27
- Label: Sumerian
- Producer: Nick Raskulinecz

Kittie chronology
Origins/Evolutions Live (2018)	Fire (2024)	Spit XXV (2025)

Singles from Fire
- 1. "Eyes Wide Open" Released: February 14, 2024; 2. "We Are Shadows" Released: April 4, 2024; 3. "Vultures" Released: May 8, 2024; 4. "One Foot in the Grave" Released: May 30, 2024

Fire is the seventh studio album by Canadian heavy metal band Kittie, released on June 21, 2024, by Sumerian Records. It is the band's first album in almost 13 years following the release of I've Failed You (2011), in between which time they were largely on an indefinite hiatus due to rising costs associated with touring and making music, a lack of public interest, and the death of bassist Trish Doan in 2017. After receiving several offers to play shows in late 2021, Kittie ended their hiatus in January 2022, with bassist Ivy Vujic returning to their lineup after a decade-long absence. Following their performances at the When We Were Young festival in October 2022, the band were signed to Sumerian and began working on new material.

Recorded with producer Nick Raskulinecz at Sienna and Rock Falcon Studios in Tennessee, Fire is a heavy metal and groove metal album which mixes heaviness and aggression with melody and hooks. It received generally positive reviews from critics, who deemed it a strong comeback album, and was nominated for the Metal/Hard Music Album of the Year award at the Juno Awards of 2025. The album reached number 13 on the UK Rock & Metal Albums chart and number 20 on Billboard's Top Album Sales chart, whilst its second single, "We Are Shadows", reached number 20 on the Billboard Mainstream Rock Airplay chart. Kittie chose not to embark on a full-scale tour in support of Fire due to commitments in its members' personal lives, opting instead to perform at various festivals alongside a few headlining dates in North America and Europe between 2024 and 2025; they also toured Australia supporting Jinjer.

== Background and recording ==
In 2011, Kittie released their sixth album I've Failed You. Due to rising costs associated with touring and writing new music and declining interest in the band's live shows, (Note: Kittie's hiatus For rising costs, see: For declining interest, see:) the members of Kittie moved on to various other musical projects and jobs after 2013. By January 2017, the band had entered an indefinite hiatus, which was briefly broken by a one-off 20th anniversary concert in October 2017, at the premiere of their Kittie: Origins/Evolutions documentary in London, Ontario. According to Kittie guitarist and vocalist Morgan Lander, the documentary and the anniversary concert were "supposed to be a nice cap on everything", allowing the band to step back whilst leaving the door open for future possibilities. In a 2018 interview, Morgan said that the band had not written any new material in over six years, and in subsequent interviews she and drummer Mercedes Lander expressed reluctance towards the possibility of recording a new Kittie album without bassist Trish Doan, who died in February 2017. In a 2021 interview with Consequence, Morgan said that Doan's death had "made it really difficult to try to feel like it's right to do more [music] when she would have wanted to be the one to be there [sic]".

In late 2021, coinciding with a resurgence of nu metal's popularity, Kittie began receiving offers by bookers to play several shows. Mercedes attributed this interest to the band's music becoming popular on the social media platform TikTok, and the release of Kittie: Origins/Evolutions onto streaming services. Kittie subsequently ended its hiatus in January 2022; bassist Ivy Vujic, whom had been a member of Kittie from 2007 to 2012, agreed to rejoin the band. After eight months of rehearsals, the band performed their first show in five years on September 8, 2022, at the Blue Ridge Rock Festival in Alton, Virginia. In October 2022, Kittie performed on all three days of the When We Were Young festival in Las Vegas, Nevada. At the When We Were Young festival, Mercedes reconnected with Sumerian Records label head Ash Avildsen, whom had previously worked with the band as their booking agent in the mid-to-late 2000s. A few weeks after the festival, he offered to sign them to his label. Kittie had not been planning for their reunion to lead to a new album and were "100% unprepared to be offered a record deal" as they had no material; Avildsen told the band that this did not matter. After discussing the idea, the band's members "agreed that it sounded like fun to get back to doing Kittie again", Mercedes said.

Kittie worked on new material between January and October 2023, demoing sixteen new songs. Unlike previous Kittie albums, where the band would jam together in a room, Fire was largely written and demoed virtually as its members had relocated to different places during the hiatus. Morgan and Mercedes lived close enough to each other for them to do "a lot of skeleton-building the old way", before sharing their riffs and ideas with the other members via Dropbox. According to guitarist Tara McLeod, Kittie's demoing practices allowed the band to "really nitpick" their ideas, stating that its guitar parts, lyrics and melodies were frequently altered to procure "the best version we could bring". The band recorded Fire in five weeks during November and December 2023 with producer Nick Raskulinecz in Tennessee, at Sienna Studios (Nashville) and Rock Falcon Studios (Brentwood). (Note: Recording of Fire: Length: Date: Studios: See also:) Mercedes said that Kittie "tried really hard to keep things quiet [around recording] because we wanted to build up speculation". Kittie did not believe Raskulinecz would be interested in working with them and did not include him on their initial shortlist of producers for the album, though eventually decided to contact him. Morgan said that he became enthusiastic about working with the band after they sent him their demo of "Eyes Wide Open"; "as soon as that riff happened, that beginning riff, he was, like, 'Sold.' " The band sought Raskulinecz's input in deciding the ten best songs to record from their demos, as they could not come to a decision themselves. (Note: When asked by Knotfest to choose their favourite song from Fire, Morgan Lander and Ivy Vujic both selected its title track, whilst Mercedes Lander and Tara McLeod chose "Vultures" and "I Still Wear This Crown", respectively.) In a 2024 interview, Mercedes suggested that the leftover tracks would be reworked and rerecorded in the future for Kittie's next album.

== Composition and lyrics ==
Fire has been described as heavy metal and groove metal. Kerrang! identified the album's core as "straight, relentless metal, sometimes melodic but mostly powering through with sinew and vim". Critics largely agreed that whilst Kittie's return from their hiatus was brought about due to the renewed popularity of the nu metal genre which they were associated with early on in their career, the album bore little resemblance to their early sound. Morgan said that the "ultimate goal" of Fire was "to bring the [Kittie] sound to the modern era", and felt that it featured elements from all of the band's previous albums, though its writing was primarily informed by the "big riffs" and vibes of their second album, Oracle (2001). Its songs mix heaviness and aggression with melody and hooks, and feature vocal harmonies, with Morgan alternating between guttural, screamed and cleanly sung vocals. Morgan credited her recent activity as the vocalist of the Canadian melodic death metal band Karkaos with helping her find "new ranges and new vocal techniques" that she would use on the album.

Fire is a story of rebirth and resurrection. It's [Kittie's] story, marked by the highest highs and the lowest lows. [...] If there's anything I want to give people, it's the message that it's never too late. Seize the chance. If you fall, get up with your head held high and you will overcome anything that stands in your way.

— Morgan Lander

According to Morgan, Fire's lyrics feature both empowering and apocalyptic themes, and contrasts between good and evil. Unlike previous albums, the lyrics were based more on "broad concepts" about the world in general, such as the fate of humanity itself, than on her personal experiences. The title track is about the "quiet rage" that develops from expectations of compliance and silence. Morgan said it was "slightly autobiographical". "I Still Wear This Crown" is about recognizing one's power and importance in their lives regardless of their treatment by others. "Falter" addresses "human bungling and the coming end of the world". Partially inspired by Kittie's experiences in the music industry, "Vultures" is about freedom from exploitation, serving as "a warning to those with hidden agendas, who thrive on deception". Mercedes felt that the song "personifies our triumph in making the record of our dreams". "We Are Shadows" is about "coming to terms with the damage we do and [accepting] our fate". Morgan said that the line "mother of tears"—a reference to the Dario Argento movie Mother of Tears—refers to "Mother Earth reflecting on all of the destruction humans have done to Earth and realising it's almost too late to fix things". "One Foot in the Grave" concerns having to "[let] go of the demons of the past to begin anew", in relation to Kittie's return and real-life experiences. "Eyes Wide Open" was the first song written for Fire, and is about trust, betrayal, and seeing past ignorance to uncover one's true motives.

== Release and promotion ==
During their performance at the Sick New World Festival on May 13, 2023, Kittie debuted their first new song in 12 years, "Vultures". On February 14, 2024, Kittie announced that they had signed with Sumerian Records and released the lead single from Fire, "Eyes Wide Open". Morgan said that the band chose to release the song "to get people's attention and make a statement". On April 4, 2024, Kittie released "We Are Shadows" as the album's second single. The song reached number 20 on the Billboard Mainstream Rock Airplay chart. On May 8, 2024, the band formally announced Fire and released a music video for "Vultures", featuring the band performing the song live at the 2024 Sick New World festival on April 27, 2024. The album's fourth single, "One Foot in the Grave", was released on May 30, 2024. The album was released on June 21, 2024. On the day of the album's release, Kittie released a music video for its title track. Upon release, Fire reached number 13 on the UK Rock & Metal Albums chart, and number 20 on Billboard's Top Album Sales chart. The album received 565,000 streams on Spotify in its first week.

Kittie began preparing for upcoming live performances in February 2024. Kittie chose not to embark on a full-scale tour in support of Fire, aiming instead to balance touring with their jobs and maintain stability in their lives; in an interview with Metal Hammer, Mercedes said that Kittie "will never be a full-time thing for us again". Following their appearance at Sick New World, Kittie performed at the Welcome to Rockville and Sonic Temple festivals in May 2024, and at the Festival d'été de Québec in Place D'Youville, Canada on July 6, 2024. From July 12 to August 23, 2024, the band embarked on a five-date headlining tour of North America, supported by Vile Creature, Unearth, Within the Ruins, Stabbing, Upon a Burning Body, VCTMS and Conquer Divide on varying dates. The day after the tour's conclusion, Kittie performed at the Havoc Fest in Jackson, Mississippi. On October 12, 2024, the band performed at the revived Mayhem Festival in San Bernardino, California. In February 2025, Kittie toured Australia supporting Jinjer, before performing at various festivals in Europe, including Rock am Ring and Rock im Park, Download, and Hellfest, and playing four headlining dates in Germany, the Netherlands, and the United Kingdom. The band then performed at the Inkcarceration Music & Tattoo Festival in Ohio on July 20, 2025.

== Critical reception ==
Professional ratings
Review scores
Source	Rating
AllMusic	4/5 stars
Blabbermouth.net	7.5/10
Classic Rock	3/5 stars
Kerrang!	3/5
laut.de	3/5 stars
Metal Hammer UK	4/5 stars
Metal Hammer Germany	4/7
Metal Injection	8/10
Outburn	9/10
Rock Hard	7.5/10

Fire received generally positive reviews from critics. Neil Z. Yeung of AllMusic praised the album's production and aggression, lauding it as a "stunning maturation and evolution for Kittie, one that makes [their] big return justified and offers hope for a new era in the band's long and winding history". Ox-Fanzine's Sandra Monterey considered it a strong comeback album, with its "strong riffs, powerful vocals and catchy melodies" proving the band had "lost none of their relevance and energy". Likewise, in his review for Blabbermouth.net, Dom Lawson considered Fire "true to the band's original spirit, but also resolutely up to date". Lawson felt that the album "rarely sounds like a throwback", a sentiment shared by Paul Travers of Metal Hammer UK, who praised Kittie for applying a "muscular modern makeover" to elements incorporated from their previous albums.

Emma Johnston of Classic Rock felt that the album would only appeal to fans of heavy metal, but nevertheless displayed "a defiant joy at play, a pure love for the genre rediscovered after all this time". Steve Beebee of Kerrang! wrote that whilst it did not do "anything new or shocking", it reestablished Kittie on the "metal map, and reminds us that there's more to them than they first got credit for". Less favourably, Annika Eichstädt of Metal Hammer Germany felt that Kittie "have the tools in their hands, but don't use them as purposefully as they could have", and that the album as a whole "elicits a benevolent shrug of the shoulders". Mia Lada-Klein of laut.de praised the album's production and songwriting but found it lacking in standout tracks.

In June 2024, Consequence listed Fire as one of the 20 best hard rock & metal albums of the year so far, and ranked "Eyes Wide Open" as the 47th best song of the year so far. The site later ranked the album at number 12 on its list of the "30 Best Metal & Hard Rock Albums of 2024". In July 2024, Metal Hammer ranked Fire as the third best album in Kittie's discography. AllMusic listed the album as one of their "Favorite Metal Albums" of 2024. The album was nominated for the Metal/Hard Music Album of the Year award at the Juno Awards of 2025, but did not win.

== Track listing ==
All tracks are written by Morgan Lander, Mercedes Lander, Tara McLeod and Ivy Vujic.

Fire track listing
No.	Title	Length
1.	"Fire"	3:28
2.	"I Still Wear This Crown"	3:42
3.	"Falter"	3:57
4.	"Vultures"	3:18
5.	"We Are Shadows"	3:35
6.	"Wound"	2:57
7.	"One Foot in the Grave"	3:42
8.	"Are You Entertained?"	3:15
9.	"Grime"	3:37
10.	"Eyes Wide Open"	3:53
Total length:		35:27

== Personnel ==
Adapted from liner notes.

Kittie
- Morgan Lander – vocals, guitar
- Tara McLeod – guitar
- Ivy Vujic – bass
- Mercedes Lander – drums
Production
- Nick Raskulinecz – production, additional engineering
- Ted Jensen – mastering (at Sterling Sound)
- Josh Wilbur – mixing
- Nathan Yarborough – engineering

Artwork

- Eddie Kepner – album artwork

== Charts ==
Chart performance for Fire
Chart (2024)	Peak position
UK Rock & Metal Albums (OCC)	13
US Top Album Sales (Billboard)	20
