= Paperdoll (EP) =

EP by Kittie
- Released: December 12, 2000
- Recorded: June 15, 2000
- Venue: Hultsfred Festival (Sweden)
- Genre: Nu metal
- Length: 18:32
- Label: Ng; Artemis
- Producer: Garth Richardson; Andreas Matz

Kittie chronology
Spit (1999)	Paperdoll (2000)	Oracle (2001)

Professional ratings
Review scores
Source	Rating
AllMusic	2/5 stars
Christgau's Consumer Guide	(1-star Honorable Mention)
Drowned in Sound	6/10

Paperdoll is the second extended play by Canadian heavy metal band Kittie, released on December 12, 2000, through Ng and Artemis Records. As of November 2003, it had sold 100,000 copies in the United States. "Paperdoll (Remix)" was, in actuality, a re-recorded song. It originally appeared on the band's debut album; however, on this EP, it was completely re-recorded with the band's then-current lineup (the original song featured bassist Tanya Candler on vocals/bass whereas the re-recorded version featured Morgan Lander on vocals and Talena Atfield on bass). The remaining five songs were recorded in June 2000 while the band toured Europe.

== Track listing ==
Paperdoll track listing
No.	Title	Length
1.	"Paperdoll (Remix)"	3:08
2.	"Spit (Live)"	2:42
3.	"Brackish (Live)"	2:55
4.	"Suck (Live)"	3:19
5.	"Do You Think I'm a Whore? (Live)"	2:14
6.	"Raven (Live)"	4:00
Total length:		18:32

== Personnel ==
Adapted from liner notes.

Kittie

- Morgan Lander – vocals, guitar
- Mercedes Lander – drums
- Fallon Bowman – guitar, backing vocals
- Talena Atfield – bass

Production

- Garth Richardson – production (1)
- Andreas Matz – production (2 to 6)
- Steve Thompson – mixing (1)
- Bo Kristanosson – engineering (2 to 6)
- Jorgen Malmberg – engineering (2 to 6)
- Matt Chiaravalle – mastering

Artwork

- Glenn Orenstein – design
- Scarlet Page – band photo

== Charts ==
Chart performance for Paperdoll
Chart (2000–01)	Peak position
US Top Independent Albums (Billboard)	22
