= Safe (EP) =

EP by Kittie
- Released: November 19, 2002
- Recorded: August 12, 2002 (live tracks)
- Venue: House of Blues (Anaheim)
- Genre: Nu metal
- Length: 26:23
- Label: Artemis
- Producer: Garth Richardson

Kittie chronology
Oracle (2001)	Safe (2002)	Until the End (2004)

Professional ratings
Review scores
Source	Rating
AllMusic	2.5/5 stars
Chronicles of Chaos	6.5/10
Rolling Stone	3/5 stars

Safe is the third EP by Canadian heavy metal band Kittie, released on November 19, 2002, through Artemis Records. It features a remix of the song "Safe" from the band's second album Oracle (2001) by Sascha Konietzko and Bill Rieflin (both of whom were members of KMFDM at that point), and five live tracks recorded at the House of Blues in Anaheim, California, on August 12, 2002. It is dedicated "In Loving Memory of Dave Williams". The EP sold 25,000 units in the United States. It received very little promotion, only appearing on 2 major rock/heavy metal magazines.

== Track listing ==
No.	Title	Length
1.	"Safe" (KMFDM Inc. Remix)	4:01
2.	"Safe" (Radio Edit)	3:47
3.	"No Name" (live)	1:59
4.	"Severed" (live)	3:21
5.	"What I Always Wanted" (live)	3:10
6.	"In Winter" (live)	5:06
7.	"Pain" (live)	4:52

== Personnel ==
Adapted from liner notes.

Kittie

- Morgan Lander - guitar, vocals
- Mercedes Lander - drums
- Jeff Phillips - guitar
- Jennifer Arroyo - bass, backing vocals

Production

- Garth Richardson - production
- Randy Staub - mixing
- Sascha Konietzko - remixing (1)
- Bill Rieflin - remixing (1)
- Westwood One - mobile recording (3–7)
- Biff Dawes - engineering, mixing (3–7)
