= Oracle (Kittie album) =

2001 studio album by Kittie

Studio album by Kittie
- Released: November 12, 2001
- Recorded: July 21 – August 14, 2001
- Studio: EMAC (London, Ontario)
- Genres: Death metal; nu metal; thrash metal
- Length: 47:41
- Label: Artemis
- Producer: Garth Richardson

Kittie chronology
Paperdoll (2000)	Oracle (2001)	Safe (2002)

Singles from Oracle
- 1. "What I Always Wanted" Released: October 9, 2001; 2. "Run Like Hell" Released: January 16, 2002; 3. "In Winter" Released: May 13, 2002

Oracle is the second studio album by Canadian heavy metal band Kittie, released on November 12, 2001, by Artemis Records. The band recorded the album as a three-piece following the departure of co-founding guitarist and vocalist Fallon Bowman, who was replaced by touring guitarist Jeff Phillips, at EMAC Recording Studios with producer Garth Richardson between July and August 2001. Categorized as death metal, nu metal, and thrash metal, Oracle has been described as an angrier, more aggressive and extreme album than Kittie's debut album Spit (1999). It was Kittie's only album with bassist Talena Atfield, who left the band four months after its release.

Upon release, Oracle received mixed reviews from critics, whom acknowledged Kittie's musical growth but were divided on the quality of the album's songwriting. Retrospective reviews have been more favourable. The album debuted at number 57 on the US Billboard 200 chart, selling 33,000 copies in its opening week, and also made appearances on the German and UK Albums Charts. By 2004, it had sold 220,000 copies in the United States. Kittie embarked on an international tour in support of Oracle that ran from August 2001 to February 2003; the band committed to extended touring as they felt it had not been publicized enough.

== Background and recording ==
In November 1999, Kittie released their debut album Spit, through Ng Records. Shortly after the album's release, Ng was acquired by Artemis Records, who gave the album a wider release on January 11, 2000. The album was a commercial success, becoming certified Gold by the Recording Industry Association of America (RIAA). In between tours in support of the album, Kittie wrote two new songs; "Pain", whose main riff was composed during soundchecks at Ozzfest, and "Mouthful of Poison". On October 31, 2000, Kittie debuted "Pain" live in San Antonio, Texas. The band played both of their new songs whilst performing on the SnoCore Rock tour in January and February 2001. Guitarist and vocalist Morgan Lander indicated around this time that Kittie's next album would be more aggressive than their debut; in a February 2001 interview with The GW Hatchet, she highlighted the fact Kittie "haven't written [new material] in 4 or 5 years" and acknowledged a change in influence from the band's early days, stating: "Then we listened to bands like Nirvana, Silverchair, and Alice in Chains. Now we listen to stuff like Cannibal Corpse and Nile". In a 2002 interview with Metal Shock, Morgan cited her interest in extreme metal and death metal and the bands Morbid Angel, Slayer, Pantera, and The Dillinger Escape Plan as influences on the songwriting of Oracle.

Following the SnoCore tour's conclusion on February 17, 2001, Kittie began working on new material in the basement of Morgan and drummer Mercedes Lander's parents' house in London, Ontario. By March 2001, they had written five or six songs. Kittie wrote the music together whilst Morgan wrote its lyrics. As with Spit, the band wrote the music first, as a "backdrop" to Morgan's vocals. The band were given three months to write and record Oracle, but it ultimately took them five; they quickly became stressed and frustrated by attempting to write new material immediately after coming off the road and took a month-long break before trying again. Mercedes said she found writing to be particularly hard as she had not "come into [her] own for writing songs" at the time. Writing was finished by June 2001. According to Mercedes, the album's songs were completed in pre-production and were not changed during recording. Weeks before recording was due to begin, co-founding member and guitarist Fallon Bowman left Kittie, due to creative differences with Morgan and her own struggles dealing with the band's newfound pressures. On July 1, 2001, Kittie played their first show with guitarist Jeff Phillips, the band's guitar tech, in Albuquerque, New Mexico. Phillips was not identified until Artemis Records released a statement on August 9, 2001, confirming that Kittie would be continuing as a three-piece with him filling in as a touring guitarist; Bowman was not named in the statement.

Kittie recorded Oracle at EMAC Recording Studios in London, Ontario with producer Garth Richardson, whom they had both used for Spit, between July 21 and August 14, 2001. As a result of Bowman's departure, Morgan recorded all of Oracle's guitar parts herself. Richardson said that recording the album was easier than its writing process due to Morgan and Mercedes "knowing what they wanted to do". In a 2001 interview with Guitar World, Morgan said that the band aimed to make a "straight-ahead metal record. Our attitude was, Don't fuck around; don't play bloops or bleeps". She said the band felt no pressure recording the album as they were confident that its material would surpass Spit. Morgan and bassist Talena Atfield recorded their parts with equipment from their live rigs. The former played a Gibson Flying V and a similarly shaped custom guitar through a Mesa/Boogie Triple Rectifer and occasionally an Egnater, whilst the latter used a five-string B.C. Rich Widow custom bass with an Ampeg B5R amp. The album's mixing process, handled by Randy Staub at The Warehouse Studio in Vancouver, was completed by the end of August 2001.

== Composition and lyrics ==
Described as an angrier, more aggressive and extreme album than Spit, Oracle has been categorized as death metal, nu metal, and thrash metal. Kori Golding of Chart Attack described its songs as "pure rage and venom", with Morgan sounding "utterly demonic". The album contains heavy, chopping guitar riffs and percussion, double bass drumming, time signature changes, and screamed, growled and cleanly sung vocals. Drowned in Sound's Ollie Appelby stated that the album is focused on presenting music "as [based on] emotion, as power", instead of instrumentation. In a 2007 interview with the Cleveland Scene, Morgan said that the aim of Oracle was to confirm that Kittie "weren't what a lot of critics wrote us off as, [and] that we were a real metal band". In a 2024 interview with Metal Hammer, Mercedes described the album as "the complete antithesis of Spit " and Kittie's attempt to lean into a heavier sound. As she had on Spit, Morgan based Oracle's lyrics off of her personal experiences, albeit from a broader, less localized perspective. In a 2001 interview with Rock Sound, she said Kittie's songs were about "human relations, interaction, and learning from your mistakes". Nick Catucci of Spin felt the album's lyrics were more introspective than confrontational, whilst Dave Ebner of The Globe and Mail highlighted their ambiguous nature. The lyrics do not feature any swearing, something Morgan said was unintentional but considered representative of her improved self-articulation.

"Oracle"
The title track features "chugging guitars, pounding drums", and hard-to-discern screamed vocals from Morgan.

"In Winter"
An alternative rock and gothic metal song, "In Winter" sees Morgan alternate between clean singing and growled vocals over a melodic counterpoint.

Oracle's two-minute long title track, which Golding and Rolling Stone's Tom Moon credited with establishing the album's tone, is characterized by its "churning guitars, pounding drums" and Morgan's hard-to-discern screamed vocals. "Mouthful of Poison" features speed metal guitar riffs and a "big '70s-style outro [that] gives it an epic, arty feel", according to Chart Attack's Liisa Ladouceur. Morgan said that the song is about people who spread false rumours and assumptions about Kittie and others to bring them down. Described as a "big pop move" by Sean Richardson of The Boston Phoenix, "In Winter" is an alternative rock and gothic metal song that sees Morgan alternate between singing and screaming, with her growling providing a counterpoint to its opening melody. "Severed", which Bradley Torreano of AllMusic described as "Pantera-esque", is about "feeling hopelessness and abandonment". Kittie began covering Pink Floyd's "Run Like Hell" at their shows after the band were asked to contribute to a Pink Floyd tribute album—which was ultimately scrapped—in February 2000. The band included the cover on Oracle as they felt the album lacked enough material. Highlighting its "drilling" double bass drumming and "coal-burning" guitarwork, Catucci described Kittie's cover as a "metamorphoses" akin to Tori Amos' cover of Eminem's "97' Bonnie & Clyde". Conversely, Graham Finney of Rock Sound remarked it was nothing other than a Kittie song due to its "gritty nu-metal twist". The song ends with an "unscripted guitar freakout". "Pain" is about "the state of being in pain", reflecting the stresses of Kittie's touring.

The lyrics of "What I Always Wanted" reflect the pressures Kittie faced from the music industry whilst working on material for Oracle. In an interview with SOCAN's Words & Music, Morgan said that "Safe" is about having hope and patience in order to achieve one's dreams. Torreano described the song as a "piano metal dirge". Mercedes said the song came about from Morgan "diddling around on the computer one day" and likened it to Kittie's earlier song "Immortal". Morgan said it was her favourite track from Oracle, feeling it proved Kittie were "capable of doing so many different things". "No Name" features "rolling drums and chugging guitars" and was compared to Machine Head circa Burn My Eyes. Morgan completed the song at the last minute before her final vocal recording session for Oracle, and as such, it did not receive a title. The album ends with the "ballad-like", ten minute-long closer "Pink Lemonade", whose length led to comparisons with the Slipknot songs "Scissors" and "Iowa". According to Mercedes, Morgan wanted to show how "some things even if they look pretty and inviting sometimes have a darker ugly side to them".

== Title and artwork ==
Morgan said that Oracle's title was intended to represent how it was Kittie's "coming-into-our-own album", stating: "An oracle speaks of truth, and sort of foresees the future. [...] We've found our own sound, and it's our truth". Morgan came up with and designed the artwork concept, which shows an x-ray of a mason jar in a stomach, after reading an article about "people swallowing weird things" in Discover magazine. Similar images displaying "x-ray images of self-mutilation" are found inside the album's liner notes, according to the Sandra Sperounes of the Edmonton Journal.

== Release ==
=== Promotion ===
On August 21, 2001, eight songs from Oracle were previewed at a private listening session at The Warehouse Studio in Vancouver. On September 7, 2001, "What I Always Wanted" was made available as a free download on the band's website. The song was serviced to radio stations as the lead single from Oracle on October 9, 2001. Thomas Mignone directed its music video, which "concerns the self-destructive consequences of greed". The single peaked at number 36 on Billboard's Active Rock chart, whilst the video received heavy airplay on the MTV, MTV2, MTVX and MuchMusic channels. On November 24, 2001, Kittie filmed two live music videos for "Pain" and "Run Like Hell" at the Harpos Theatre in Detroit, Michigan, which they both self-financed. The latter track was released as a digital-only single on January 16, 2002, and its music video was aired on MTV2's Headbangers Ball. That same month, Artemis serviced the Live in Hell extended play (EP) to radio, featuring the song and three live tracks recorded in Detroit. On May 13, 2002, "In Winter" was released as Oracle's third and final single. Morgan expressed interest in making a video for the song but said it was unlikely due to a lack of support.

Artemis Records shipped 400,000 copies of Oracle to stores prior to its release, and promoted the album through independent retailers and magazines including Bust, ROCKRGRL, Metal Edge, Rolling Stone and Spin. According to Artemis employee Michael Krumper, the label targeted MTV2 and heavy metal magazines instead of fashion and teen magazines as the "true metal fan [wasn't] going to look for [Kittie] there". Following manufacturing delays due to the September 11 attacks, Oracle was released in Europe on November 12, 2001, and in the United States the day after. The album debuted and peaked at number 57 on the US Billboard 200 chart, selling 33,000 copies in its first week. The album also reached number 91 on the German Offizielle Top 100 Albums chart, and number 121 on the UK Albums Chart. By July 2004, Oracle had sold 220,000 copies in the United States. The members of Kittie felt that Artemis had not properly promoted and advertised the album, leading them to committ to extended touring to "spread the word" about it; Morgan later claimed that whilst touring in support of it, the band had met fans whom were unaware they had released another album outside of Spit. In a November 2002 interview with Prick, Morgan said that Kittie were looking to leave their label as the band didn't "want to put out another album that's going to fall on deaf ears".

=== Touring ===
Kittie embarked on an international tour in support of Oracle. During the weekend of August 25–26, 2001, the band performed at the Beast Fest in Japan, after which they played a few shows in Europe, Australia, and North America. The band then embarked on two tours of North America, from October 21 to November 23, 2001, and December 27, 2001, to January 26, 2002. Ill Niño supported the band on both tour legs, with No One and Chimaira providing additional support on the second. From February 2 to March 2, 2002, the Kittie toured Europe supported by Shadows Fall. On March 18, 2002, Talena Atfield left the band. Two days later, Kittie recruited Jennifer Arroyo, formerly of the rap metal band Spine, as her replacement. Arroyo and Kittie had first met each other in 2000, when both of their bands played on Farmclub.com.

Arroyo played her debut gig with Kittie in Manchester, New Hampshire on March 29, 2002. From April 7 to April 21, 2002, Kittie embarked on the F.ck Yer Label tour with Skinlab, Flaw and My Ruin. Kittie toured Europe as part of the first and only Ozzfest tour of the continent from May 17 to June 7, 2002, (Note: The final six dates of the European Ozzfest tour (June 8–16, 2002) were cancelled.) before returning to the United States for a tour with Shadows Fall, Poison the Well, Killswitch Engage and Hotwire in July and August. In October and November 2002, the band toured with Ünloco, Acacia and Clockwise. Coinciding with the tour, Kittie released the Safe EP on November 19, 2002, which features five live tracks recorded at the House of Blues in Anaheim, California, on August 12, 2002, and two remixes of "Safe" by Sascha Konietzko of KMFDM. The EP had sold 20,000 copies by November 2003. In January and February 2003, Kittie toured the United States with Brand New Sin and Eighteen Visions. (Note: Biohazard were initially involved in the tour, but dropped out after the band's bassist and vocalist Evan Seinfeld was hospitalized due to an unknown illness.)

== Critical reception ==
Professional ratings
Aggregate scores
Source	Rating
Metacritic	56/100
Review scores
Source	Rating
AllMusic	3/5 stars
Alternative Press	4/5 stars
Blender	2/5 stars
Collector's Guide to Heavy Metal	7/10
Drowned in Sound	9/10
Kerrang!	3/5 stars
NME	5/10
Q	2/5 stars
Rolling Stone	2.5/5 stars
Spin	7/10

On review aggregator website Metacritic, Oracle holds a score of 56 out of 100, based on reviews from eight critics, which indicates "mixed or average reviews". Bradley Torreano of AllMusic called it "an average album by a promising band who needs to find a distinct identity". Eden Miller of PopMatters praised the album's musicianship and Morgan Lander's vocals, but felt that "its music relies too much on metal formula". Catherine Yates of Kerrang! said the album was "simply not bad" and described much of it as "a seamless, streamlined execution of pretty unoriginal material" lacking in creative moments. Rolling Stone critic Tom Moon felt Kittie were divided between "[playing] doomsayer or dominatrix" and were unable to mix "melodic hooks" with "ordinary, one-dimensional power-chord catharsis". Ambika Thompson of Now highlighted Kittie's ability to "[mix] the growly with the melodic, vocally and musically" compared to other bands, but ultimately felt the album "sound[s] like one long rant". NME's Imran Ahmed similarly commented that, with the exception of "Safe", the album's "violent marriage of melody and brutality [...] makes for a highly uneasy listen". Robert Christgau of The Village Voice gave the album a one-star "honorable mention", commenting: "when they are good they are horrid".

Ollie Appleby of Drowned in Sound felt that Oracle's instrumentation and vocals allowed it to transcend into "something far more than the sum of it's [sic] parts". Alternative Press saw Kittie as having "[moved] from novelty status to bone-crushing legitimacy". Tommy Udo of Metal Hammer believed the album would silence Kittie's doubters and detractors and said the band displayed greater confidence in their songwriting through their avoidance of Spit's "brat shock tactics". Though considering it to be "sloppy" when compared with Pantera and Slayer, Paul Rogers of the Las Vegas Weekly said that Oracle "shows a marked improvement over Kittie's previous output" and praised the band for their "authentic malice" and rejection of "commercial pressures". Hit Parader was less enthusiastic, finding it to be less "satisfying" than Spit despite Kittie's "technical and song-structure" improvements. Elmar Salmutter of Ox-Fanzine believed Kittie's songwriting was less stereotypical and clichéd than Spit's but was still not good and found their attempts "to sound as evil and nasty as possible" unintentionally humorous. Chart Attack's Golding believed that Kittie were "just trying harder to be hard just because they're girls", whilst Ben Mitchell of Blender thought the band did not warrant the attention they had gotten from the press and dismissed the album as "entirely dispensible". Referencing the "love/hate relationship" between the band, fans and the press, Graham Finney concluded his review of Oracle for Rock Sound: "The best thing you can say about [it] is that it's a good, 'current' album—[Kittie's] fans will love it and the rest of you will hate it".

Retrospectively, Jon Hadusek of Consequence and Denize Falzon of Exclaim! described Oracle as representing Kittie's "heyday" alongside Spit, with the latter considering it to be their best album. In 2007, Mark Fisher of the Times West Virginian called it "one of the heaviest albums of the last decade" and credited it with establishing the band "as a legitimate force in heavy music". In 2008, Hit Parader placed Oracle at number 82 on their list of "The Top 100 CDs of the 21st Century". Attributing contemporary criticism of the band to male chauvinism, Canadian journalist Martin Popoff remarked in The Collector's Guide to Heavy Metal: Volume 4: The '00s (2011) that Kittie were both "heavy as hell" and "advanced" for their era, praising the band's "adventurous" and "proggy" song structures and Atfield and Mercedes' ability to "pound out a bottom end that keeps one interested". In 2024, Paul Travers of Metal Hammer ranked it as Kittie's best album, viewing its pivot to extreme metal as "not only a bold move" for the band, but one that "resulted in a stormer of an album that would stand the test of time".

== Track listing ==
All tracks are written by Kittie, except "Run Like Hell", written by David Gilmour and Roger Waters.

Standard release
No.	Title	Length
1.	"Oracle"	2:02
2.	"Mouthful of Poison"	4:38
3.	"In Winter"	5:32
4.	"Severed"	3:20
5.	"Run Like Hell" (Pink Floyd cover)	4:09
6.	"Pain"	3:49
7.	"Wolves"	3:25
8.	"What I Always Wanted"	3:43
9.	"Safe"	4:12
10.	"No Name"	2:14
11.	"Pink Lemonade"	10:37
Total length:		47:41

European limited edition CD (recorded live in Hultsfred, Sweden on June 15, 2000)
No.	Title	Length
12.	"Spit"	2:44
13.	"Brackish"	2:54
14.	"Suck"	3:19
15.	"Do You Think I'm a Whore?"	2:21
16.	"Raven"	4:00
Total length:		63:07

== Personnel ==
Personnel per liner notes.

Kittie
- Morgan Lander – vocals, guitar, piano
- Mercedes Lander – drums
- Talena Atfield – bass

Artwork

- Morgan Lander – artwork concept
- Brett Weiss – album artwork and layout (for JSR Merchandising)
- Yvette Conley – photography
- Dr. Matthew Somers – x ray consultant
- Dr. Michael Richardson – x-rays
Production
- Garth Richardson – producer, engineering
- Chris Vaugh-Jones – production co-ordinator
- Randy Staub – mixing
- Robert Nation – engineering
- Siegfried Meier – second engineer
- Howie Weinberg – mastering (at Masterdisk)
- Ben Kaplan – digital editing
- Richard Leighton – guitar tech

== Charts ==
=== Weekly charts ===
Chart (2001–02)	Peak position
Canadian Albums (Nielsen Soundscan)	66
German Albums (Offizielle Top 100)	91
UK Rock & Metal Albums (Official Charts)	12
UK Albums (OCC)	121
US Top Independent Albums (Billboard)	3
US Billboard 200	57

=== Year-end charts ===
Chart (2002)	Peak position
US Top Independent Albums (Billboard)	13

== Bibliography ==
- "Kittie: Oracle". Alternative Press. No. 162. January 2002. p. 86. ISSN 1065-1667.
- "Kittie: Oracle". Q. No. 184. EMAP. December 2001. p. 139. ISSN 0955-4955.
- "Kittie, Oracle | Hit or Miss". Hit Parader. No. 452. Magma Publishing Group. May 2002. p. 74. ISSN 0162-0266 – via Internet Archive.
- "Active Rock: Going for Adds" (PDF). R&R. No. 1422. October 5, 2001. p. 97. ISSN 0277-4860 – via worldradiohistory.com.
- "Upcoming New Releases: Rock" (PDF). HITS. Vol. 16, no. 793. May 10, 2002. p. 44. OCLC 15994494 – via worldradiohistory.com.
- "The Year in Music 2002". Billboard. Vol. 114, no. 52. Nielsen Business Media, Inc. December 28, 2002. p. YE-36. ISSN 0006-2510.
- Arnopp, Jason (January 6, 2001). "50 LPs for 2001: Kittie". Kerrang!. No. 834. EMAP. p. 41. ISSN 0262-6624.
- Bargone, Roberto (January 15, 2002). "Kittie: Semplicemente Estreme" [Simply Extreme]. Metal Shock (in Italian). No. 351. pp. 18–21. OCLC 955301070.
- Catucci, Nick (December 2001). "Kittie: Oracle". Spin. Vol. 17, no. 12. p. 154. ISSN 0886-3032.
- Correia, Frank (December 21, 2001). "Heavy for the Holidays" (PDF). R&R. No. 1433. p. 28. ISSN 0277-4860 – via worldradiohistory.com.
- Durham, Victoria (November 2001). "Kittie: Claws for Thought". Rock Sound. No. 30. UK: IXO Publishing Ltd. pp. 36–38. ISSN 1465-0185.
- Ebner, Dave (November 10, 2001). "The sound and the fury". The Globe and Mail. p. R5. ProQuest 384283163.
- Finney, Graham (November 2001). "Reviews: Rock". Rock Sound. No. 30. UK: IXO Publishing Ltd. p. 86. ISSN 1465-0185.
- Fissure, Lalena (January 15, 2003). "Whiskers in the Dark: Kittie Safe Artemis". The Village Voice. p. 127. ProQuest 232293759.
- Glover, Adrian Gregory (December 18, 2002). "Kittie: Grrrr....Purrrr...". The Aquarian Weekly. Vol. 2169. p. 12. ISSN 0739-1919.
- Hannaham, James (January 2002). "Underage Against the Machine". Spin. Vol. 18, no. 1. pp. 25–26. ISSN 0886-3032.
- Hart, Gerry (December 10, 2001). "Points of Impact". CMJ New Music Report. Vol. 69, no. 742. CMJ Network, Inc. p. 35. ISSN 0890-0795.
- Jennings, Nicholas (Winter 2001). "What's new, Kittie? The all-girl heavy-metal band is moving from hate to hope". Words & Music. Vol. 8, no. 4. SOCAN. p. 6. ProQuest 218674309.
- Lane, Daniel (February 2001). "The Year 2K: Kittie". Metal Hammer. No. 83. UK: Future plc. pp. 40–41. ISSN 0955-1190.
- Lane, Daniel (September 15, 2001). "New Kids on the Rock: 10 Metallic Autumn Releases" (PDF). Music Week. No. 83. UBM plc. p. 15. ISSN 0265-1548 – via worldradiohistory.com.
- Lwin, Nanda (2003). "Kittie". Top Albums: The Essential Chart Guide. Toronto: Music Data Canada. p. 155. ISBN 9781896594149 – via Internet Archive.
- McCallum, Rob (director) (2017). Kittie: Origins/Evolutions (Motion picture). Canada: Lightyear Entertainment.
- Miller, Gerri (December 1, 2001). "Ready to Rock". Billboard. Vol. 113, no. 48. p. 26. ISSN 0006-2510.
- Nall, Jeff (October 11, 2002). "Kittie more than just girls with guitars". Florida Today. p. 26. ProQuest 890353712.
- Popoff, Martin; Perri, David (2011). The Collector's Guide to Heavy Metal: Volume 4: The '00s. Burlington, Ontario, Canada: Collector's Guide Publishing. p. 268. ISBN 9781-926592-20-6.
- Richardson, Sean (November 16, 2001). "Off the Record". The Boston Phoenix (Arts). Vol. 30, no. 46. p. 24 – via Internet Archive.
- Saidman, Sorelle (August 14, 2001). "Kittie guitarist definitely gone". The Province. p. B13. ProQuest 269289810.
- Sciarretto, Amy (January 28, 2002). "Loud Rock". CMJ New Music Report. Vol. 70, no. 4. CMJ Network, Inc. p. 14. ISSN 0890-0795.
- Sciarretto, Amy, ed. (September 2008). "The Top 100 CDs of the 21st Century". Hit Parader. No. 518. Magma Publishing Group. p. 89. ISSN 0162-0266 – via Internet Archive.
- Sperounes, Sandra (November 17, 2001). "New releases". Edmonton Journal. p. C3. ProQuest 252944919.
- Stillman, Brian (December 2001). "Meow Mix". Guitar World. Vol. 21, no. 12. Harris Publications. pp. 62–64, 66, 102, 104. ISSN 1045-6295.
- Udo, Tommy (December 2001). "Feline Sick: Album Reviews". Metal Hammer. No. 94. UK: Future plc. p. 74. ISSN 0955-1190.
- Yates, Catherine (November 10, 2001). "Albums". Kerrang!. No. 878. EMAP. p. 46. ISSN 0262-6624.
