= Spit (album) =

Studio album by Kittie
- Released: January 11, 2000
- Recorded: May 1999 (Note: "Paperdoll" was re-recorded following the departure of Tanya Candler in September 1999.)
- Studio: EMAC (London, Ontario)
- Genre: Nu metal
- Length: 37:23
- Labels: Ng; Artemis
- Producer: Garth Richardson

Kittie chronology
Kittie (1999)	Spit (2000)	Paperdoll (2000)

Singles from Spit
- 1. "Brackish" Released: January 11, 2000; 2. "Charlotte" Released: June 5, 2000

Original cover

Spit is the debut studio album by the Canadian heavy metal band Kittie, released on January 11, 2000. Kittie were formed in 1996, and signed to Ng Records, which later merged with Artemis Records, following their performances at the Canadian Music Week festival in March 1999. Recorded over nine days in May 1999 with producer Garth Richardson at EMAC Recording Studios in London, Ontario, Spit is a nu metal album that incorporates elements from various genres. Inspired by life experiences, its lyrics address topics including sexism, hatred, ignorance, abuse, self-image, conformity, and betrayal. The album is Kittie's only release with their original line-up, featuring bassist Tanya Candler and guitarist Fallon Bowman. Candler left the band prior to its release in September 1999, after which they recruited bassist Talena Atfield, who appears on its cover and on a re-recorded version of "Paperdoll".

Spit received generally favourable reviews from critics, who praised its production, musicianship, and songwriting but criticized its lyrics and vocals. The album was promoted with the release of two singles, "Brackish" and "Charlotte", and extensive tours of North America and Europe between July 1999 and February 2001. Assisted by Internet word-of-mouth and Kittie's touring efforts, Spit was a commercial success, reaching number 79 on the US Billboard 200 chart and being certified gold by the Recording Industry Association of America (RIAA) in October 2000. The album sold 100,000 copies in Europe, but did not perform as well in Canada due to a lack of radio support and touring. It remains Kittie's best-selling album, having sold over 660,000 copies in the United States by April 2003. Retrospectively, Spit has been listed as one of the greatest nu metal albums of all time by Kerrang!, Loudwire, Metal Hammer, and Revolver.

== Background ==
Kittie were formed in September 1996 in London, Ontario, by drummer Mercedes Lander and guitarist Fallon Bowman, who met in a gymnastics class. They bonded over their shared interest in grunge artists such as Nirvana and Silverchair and started jamming together after realizing they both played instruments. Mercedes' sister Morgan joined as their guitarist and vocalist four or five months later. The trio started out playing covers of Nirvana, Silverchair, Deftones, and Korn before attempting to write their own material; "Brackish" was the first song they wrote together. Morgan, Mercedes, and Bowman wrote the songs on Spit over the course of a year and a half, and had completed most of them by the time Tanya Candler joined Kittie as their bassist in November 1997, completing their lineup. The band wrote the music for the songs first as a "backdrop" to their vocals, which would be handled by whoever wrote its lyrics.

Kittie played their first show at a Battle of the Bands competition at Call the Office on February 28, 1998. The band's second performance, at a high school talent show, was cut short by a female principal who did not believe women should be playing music of their style. (Note: Mercedes said the incident marked Kittie's first experience with discrimination.) Thereafter, Kittie began performing around London every one or two weeks, at either Call the Office or The Embassy, and recorded two demos at EMAC Recording Studios engineered by studio co-owner Robert Nation. Producer Garth Richardson was sent one of the band's demos and agreed to record their debut album for a minimum fee. In March 1999, Kittie performed at the Canadian Music Week festival in Toronto. Morgan said that the band had most of their songs ready by this point and were to record Spit with Richardson after the festival, which they planned to release themselves.

Kittie received several record label offers from their Canadian Music Week performance, and ultimately signed with Ng Records, an independent label operating out of New York. Although Ng had previously rejected the band's demos, the label took interest in Kittie after its vice president Jason Wyner saw them perform. Mercedes said that Kittie signed with Ng as they believed the small label would pay more attention to the band than a larger one; Morgan also said Ng showed greater enthusiasm in the band than Canadian record labels, who considered them "too raw and aggressive". Kittie did not officially sign to Ng until after Spit was recorded, in June or July 1999, as they did not want to be told what to do by the label whilst working on the album.

== Recording ==
Kittie recorded Spit with Richardson over nine days at EMAC in May 1999, at a cost of US$57,000. As the band's members were still attending high school at the time, they recorded in the evenings after they had dinner and completed their homework at the studio. Kittie wanted Spit to sound raw, yet professional-sounding, and reflective of their live shows. Richardson brought in a Pro Tools setup to record the album, alongside an array of equipment and amplifiers the band spent a day experimenting with. They used ESP and Squier guitars, a homemade guitar by Richardson, and Morgan's custom Gibson Flying V, which had all three of its humbuckers turned on for a "huge, meaty sound". In place of effects pedals, guitar distortion was produced using a combination of Orange, Marshall, and Soldano amplifiers. Bowman only used one pedal on the entire album, an Ibanez Classic Phase. Due to short recording window, Mercedes' drums were mostly recorded in one take, Morgan's vocals were not double-tracked, and any mistakes were left on the final album. Morgan played bass on three songs, including "Raven" and "Immortal".

Most of Spit's songs remained unchanged from when they were first written. Though Richardson claimed his input was limited to helping Kittie choose sounds and suggestions on guitar and drum parts, Morgan would credit him with helping the band with some vocal arrangements and melodies. She also said Kittie rearranged the structure of "Paperdoll" after he pointed out a "catchy hook" in the song. "Brackish" was nearly left off of Spit due to problems surrounding its arrangements, but would come into its own when Kittie recruited DJ Dave, a friend of Nation's, to add some jungle beats to the track. Morgan wrote the song's chorus in the studio's vocal booth a week later, and the band recorded it the next day. Spit was then mixed by Chris Shaw at Soundtrack and EMAC (except "Paperdoll", by Matt Chiaravalle), and mastered by Howie Weinberg at Masterdisk. The album was completed in August 1999.

== Composition ==
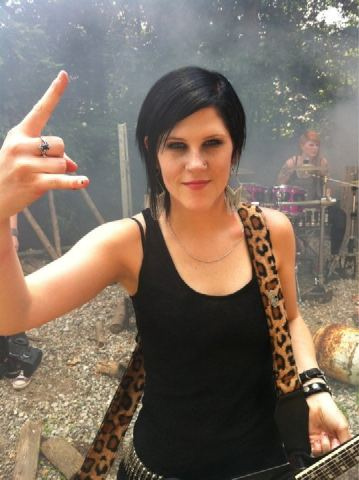
Morgan Lander's lyrics on Spit drew from her personal experiences in Kittie's hometown of London, Ontario.

Spit has primarily been described as a nu metal album. (Note: Attributed to multiple sources:) Rolling Stone described the album as blending thrash metal, grunge, death metal, and alternative rock; other journalists described it as grindcore, hard rock, hardcore punk, and techno. Spit's songs feature drop C-tuned guitars, heavy basslines, stop-start structures, tempo shifts, melodic sensibilities, and manic percussion driven by double kick drums and cymbals. Morgan alternates between guttural, growled, screamed, sung, and spoken vocals; she attributed her use of the latter to her lack of singing ability at the time.

Kittie's songwriting was influenced by its members' differing music tastes. Morgan listened to a mixture of heavy and soft artists, including Far, Gary Numan, Nile, Placebo, Portishead, Silverchair, Sneaker Pimps, and Today Is the Day, and also black metal, hip-hop, and R&B music. Bowman listened to hip-hop, pop, and heavy metal alongside Björk, Depeche Mode, Madonna, Orgy, and Weezer, whilst Mercedes listened to industrial artists like Nine Inch Nails and Prick as well as 1980s new wave and hardcore. Both cited industrial metal as an influence. Kittie also thanks Static-X, Napalm Death, and System of a Down in Spit's liner notes.

Spit's lyrics address topics including sexism, hatred, ignorance, abuse, self-image, self-esteem, conformity, and betrayal. They express feelings of anger, fear, self-loathing, teen angst, and world-weariness. Morgan's lyrics drew from her personal experiences in London, Ontario, and detail events involving close friends or herself; she considered their perspective to be more "localized" compared to Kittie's later output. Bowman described the songs as summarizing its members' life experiences. Morgan said that although Kittie's members had relatively normal upbringings, they wanted to explore the flaws of society and their environment in an honest manner. Mercedes likewise said the band were "trying to show the imperfect, imperfections of coming from a suburban place".

Kittie's image and lyrical content led to the band being described as feminists or riot grrrls, neither of which they identified as. Morgan said Kittie emphasized a "theme" of equality though did not discuss it in their songs, and that their music was for "human beings" than persons of a particular gender. In a 2021 interview with Metal Hammer, Morgan said Kittie's beliefs in equality aligned with feminism, but that they did not understand it well at the time and were afraid of being associated with its misconceptions.

== Songs ==
"Brackish"
"Brackish" incorporates elements of techno and drum and bass and features vocal interplay in its chorus.

"Get Off (You Can Eat a Dick)"
"Get Off (You Can Eat a Dick)" was written about Kittie's second show, which marked their first experience with discrimination.

"Choke"
"Choke" is a song about betrayal that Rolling Stone described as recalling 1970s hard rock with its "satanic churn".

Spit's opening title track was written in reaction to the attitude of local bands towards Kittie, and was described by Mercedes as "[representing] the meaner side of [the band]". "Charlotte" stylistically alternates between speed metal, hardcore, anthem, and ballad, and features cutting, reverberated guitars, and fast-paced drums. Its lyrics, inspired by a serial killer from the book Rites of Burial by Tom Jackman and Troy Cole, were described by journalist Mark Beaumont as "[telling] the story of a woman who ends up with her boyfriend's head in her closet". "Suck" and "Do You Think I'm a Whore?" are "angst-ridden" tracks featuring abrasive vocals and guitars, repetitive basslines and staccato drums. The latter deals with self-image and judgement by others for the way women dress. Morgan said the song's title was given "basically to prove people wrong", and that the lyric "I look in the mirror, the whore is all I see"—the only lyric printed in Spit's liner notes—was meant to encourage people to see beyond their face value. "Brackish" was written about a friend of Kittie's and a toxic relationship they were in with an older man, and was described as a call "for women to be strong and emotionally independent" by Brenda Bouw of the National Post. The song incorporates techno elements, a drum and bass interlude, and its chorus features vocal interplay between Morgan and Bowman. "Jonny" is about realizing nobody is perfect, including one's role models. Chuck Campbell of the Knoxville News Sentinel called the song a "metallic maelstrom" and highlighted its "coquettish" refrain.

"Trippin' " is an intense track that Phil Alexander of Kerrang! described as providing a contrast to earlier, more melodic tracks on Spit. "Raven" features "syncopated" beats and distorted guitarwork, and was inspired by a death threat Kittie received from a male band they competed against in a talent show in Ontario. "Get Off (You Can Eat a Dick)" was written about Kittie's second show, and was titled after remarks for the band to "get off". The song opens with Morgan moaning over pounded guitars before screaming its title lyric over Mercedes' drums. Telegram & Gazette's Craig Semon viewed the song as attacking "misconceived notions of out-of-touch authority figures". Bowman wrote the lyrics of "Choke" in response to a betrayal. Arion Berger of Rolling Stone likened the song musically to 1970s hard rock with its "satanic churn". "Paperdoll" attacks the image of women as "blow-up dolls", and sees Morgan sing over a "twangy" guitar rhythm and a drum beat that Semon likened to nails being hammered into a coffin. Its lyrics were written by Candler, who originally sang lead vocals on it. Spit ends with the gothic instrumental track "Immortal", which Jason Pettigrew of Alternative Press called "forboding". The song was supposed to have lyrics, but were scrapped and forgotten; its original opening line was "The eyes of the victim".

== Release and promotion ==
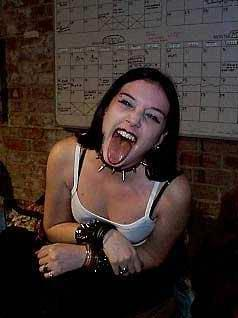
Talena Atfield appears on the cover of Spit, and performs bass on the re-recording of "Paperdoll".

Kittie began touring in support of Spit in July 1999, when they performed at the Milwaukee Metalfest. In August, the band embarked on their first tour of the United States with Skinlab and Pissing Razors. Morgan said the tour was intended to test how well Kittie handled touring, and said they enjoyed it. After performing at the Big Day Off in Hartford, Connecticut in September 1999, Candler left Kittie, citing discomfort with the band's growing popularity and personal issues. Talena Atfield, a friend of Mercedes' who had attended a number of Kittie's early shows, was recruited as Candler's replacement; despite having never played bass prior to joining Kittie, she learnt all of Spit's songs within one week. Following a warm-up show, the band performed at the CMJ Music Festival in New York City, where a live music video was film for Spit's lead single, "Brackish".

Promotional copies of Spit were sent out in the fall of 1999; Morgan said she had received reviews of the album as early as September. The album was due to be released on October 19, 1999, but was delayed by Candler's departure, which forced Kittie to change its artwork and re-record "Paperdoll", which she had sung lead vocals on. Atfield appears on the reissue cover, and performs on the re-recording. Shortly thereafter, Ng was bought out by Artemis Records, and Kittie was moved over to the latter label. Morgan said that Kittie avoided being dropped from Artemis following the merger, unlike other artists on Ng's roster, due to their "buzz" around New York City and the support of Wyner, Ng owner Michael Chambers, and the heads of Artemis.

Artemis promoted Spit through radio speciality stations and in the press. In October 1999, a three-song sampler was sent to radio stations, which reached number one on the CMJ Loud Rock Chart in December that year. Artemis also set up an internet and print marketing campaign with the online music service MyPlay.com, through which users were offered a free download of "Brackish" and "Choke". Spit was released through Ng/Artemis on January 11, 2000; Sony Music handled its distribution outside of the United States. By the time of its release, Kittie had been featured in numerous magazines and an MTV News 1515 report, whilst "Brackish" had been downloaded thousands of times on MyPlay. The song was concurrently released as Spit's lead single; its music video entered rotation on MTV, The Box, and MuchMusic.

In January 2000, Kittie toured the United States with Slipknot and Will Haven. The members of Kittie left high school prior to the tour, and later dropped out in favour of doing a GED. In February, the band toured the United States with Sevendust. Kittie filmed an appearance on the talk show Later around this time; they were subsequently invited to perform on Late Night With Conan O'Brien, where they made their debut late night television appearance on February 23, 2000, performing "Brackish". The band then toured the United Kingdom supporting Slipknot on their debut tour of the country, and toured the rest of Europe thereafter in March 2000. In early April 2000, Kittie played a few Canadian shows with Slipknot, before embarking on a headlining American tour with Chevelle, Shuvel, and the Step Kings from April 27 to May 28. "Charlotte" was released as the second single from Spit on June 5, 2000. Its music video, filmed with director Lisa Rubish in early May 2000, was an MTV hit. On July 11, 2000, Kittie released the home video Spit in Your Eye, featuring performance footage and interviews filmed during their early tours with Slipknot and Sevendust.

Following a European summer festival tour, Kittie returned to the United States to perform on the Ozzfest tour, between July 2 and September 2, 2000. The band were the only all-female act on that year's Ozzfest bill, and second overall to play at the festival after Drain STH. According to Mercedes, Kittie were asked to begin recording a new album after Ozzfest but refused as they didn't feel it was time to stop touring then. From September 5 to 16, 2000, Kittie embarked on its first tour of Canada, supported by Disturbed. After a planned tour supporting Pantera was cancelled due to vocalist Phil Anselmo falling and breaking two ribs, Kittie formed a headlining tour with Mudvayne, Apartment 26, and Factory 81 that ran from November 18 to December 1, 2000. On December 12, 2000, the band released the Paperdoll EP, featuring a remix of "Paperdoll" and some live tracks recorded at the Hultsfred Festival in Sweden in June. Following the SnoCore Rock Tour in January and February 2001, Kittie began working on their next album.

== Critical reception ==
Professional ratings
Review scores
Source	Rating
AllMusic	4.5/5 stars
Collector's Guide to Heavy Metal	7/10
Entertainment Weekly	B+
Kerrang!	4/5 stars
NME	4/10
Q	2/5 stars
Rock Sound UK	5/5 stars
Rolling Stone	3/5 stars
Select	3/5 stars
The Village Voice	C+

Spit received generally mixed to favorable reviews. Music critics generally praised the album's production and musicianship. Roxanne Blanford of AllMusic said it was "simultaneously retro and progressive in its blunt musical expression". Martin Popoff felt that Kittie could rock "heavily and smartly" and praised their songwriting as "way beyond [its members] years". Alexander of Kerrang! highlighted Kittie's combination of "power, naivety and naked aggression", whilst Lalena Fissure of The Village Voice and Beth Johnson of Entertainment Weekly enjoyed the album's blend of heavy and melodic qualities. Tanya L. Edwards of Spin said the album's straightforward production and style prevented Kittie from coming off as "posturing" or falling into common faults in nu metal bands of the time. Sandy Masuo of MTV News praised the production but said that like other nu metal bands, it was still possible to "overlook [Kittie's] genuinely impressive chops amid all the bluster". Valerie Potter of Q said that despite the production "[doing] the band justice", Spit's songs were unoriginal. Berger of Rolling Stone and Tanya Richardson of The Stranger felt the album was repetitive, though the former found it was "fairly good-natured" and highlighted its songs involving Mercedes' "tricky drum work". Darren Sadler of Metal Hammer said Kittie were a competent albeit unmemorable band, but nevertheless considered Spit "a promising debut".

Spit's lyrics and Morgan's vocals were met with mixed responses. Reno Gazette-Journal reviewer Mark Earnest considered Spit the work of a "great basic hard-rock band", though he found "juvenile" lyrics and "typical metal growling" occasionally brought the album down. Fissure found the lyrics both juvenile and unintentionally funny. Alexander took issue with "Do You Think I'm a Whore?" and "Jonny" for their adherence to "aggro-rock clichés", referring to the former's "rhetoric" and the latter's chorus. Potter felt Morgan sounded unconfident when attempting more conventional vocal styles outside of screaming; conversely, Nathalie Vincent of Rock Sound France highlighted her melodic vocals but said she sounded hoarse and out of breath when attempting "hardcore" styles. Caroline Sullivan of The Guardian felt her vocal "maelstrom" made the lyrics on the "unlistenable doom-metal" album incomprehensible. More favourably, Amy Sciarretto of CMJ New Music Report said Morgan's vocals to be on par with Bowman's performance on guitar, which she described as being as competent as a death metal musician.

Some reviewers took issue with Kittie's image and attitude. Mark Jenkins of The Washington Post viewed the band's all-female status as their sole "distinguishing feature" and dismissed them as a "bore". Roman Sokal of Exclaim! accused the band of being calculated with its focus on "shock novelty", whilst a reviewer for NME said they were "too conscious of the nu-metal zeitgeist to affect any real menace". Robert Christgau, also of The Village Voice, believed that Korn fans thought more of "four teenage girls [...] bellowing 'Get Off (You Can Eat a Dick)' ", than of them "bellow[ing] loud enough". In a subsequent interview with Rolling Stone, Christgau said he approved of what Kittie did but felt they "[didn't] do it well"; he compared them unfavorably to the Donnas and believed they fell short of the media expectations surrounding them, which would give men a reason to dismiss women playing rock music. Oliver of Metal.de was disappointed by people paying more attention to Kittie's looks than their music, which he felt was "easily in the top leagues". Expressing similar sentiments, Michelle Solomon of the Detroit Free Press believed the band gave its peers Korn and Limp Bizkit a "run for their money".

In 2007, Hit Parader ranked Spit fourth on its list of the "All-Time Top 10 Female-Fronted Metal Discs". "Brackish" appeared on Fuse's "19 Best Nu-Metal Hits of All Time" list in 2015, and was ranked number 23 on Spin's "30 Best Nu Metal Songs" list in 2017. In the early 2020s, Spit was listed as one of the greatest nu metal albums of all time by Kerrang!, Loudwire, Metal Hammer, and Revolver. In 2023, Rolling Stone listed the album's title track as the 82nd greatest heavy metal song of all time. In a 2024 ranking of Kittie's albums, Paul Travers of Metal Hammer ranked it second, stating: "Rightly or wrongly, [it] remains the iconic sound of the band for many people".

== Commercial performance ==
Assisted by built-up demand from the MyPlay promotion, Spit debuted on the US Billboard 200 chart at number 147 on January 29, 2000, with first week sales of 8,800 copies. The album topped the Billboard Heatseekers Albums chart two weeks later, and reached its peak position on the Billboard 200 at number 79 on April 15, 2000. "Brackish" and "Charlotte" respectively charted at numbers 31 and 35 on the Billboard Active Rock Tracks chart. On October 17, 2000, Spit was certified gold by the Recording Industry Association of America (RIAA), signifying the album had shipped in excess of 500,000 copies in the United States. As of April 2003, the album has sold over 660,000 copies in the country. Outside the United States, Spit had sold 100,000 copies in Europe by February 2001. "Brackish" and "Charlotte" both charted on the UK Singles Chart, at numbers 46 and 60, respectively. Spit was less successful in Canada, where 40,000 copies had been sold by April 2003.

Spit's commercial success in the United States was attributed to internet word-of-mouth and Kittie's touring regimen, with Artemis executive Danny Goldberg crediting both efforts with helping the label overcome difficulties in promoting Kittie at rock radio due to its status as an all-female band. TechTV credited the album with establishing a network of over 100 Kittie fansites by August 2000. (Note: In a September 2000 interview, Mercedes claimed to have seen around 250 Kittie fansites.) The album's lack of success in Canada was attributed to a lack of radio support—although Kittie's music videos were aired on MuchMusic—and the band's lack of a touring base, having only embarked on its first tour of its Canada towards the end of 2000. (Note: In an April 2000 interview with Chart Attack, Morgan said that Artemis had "shunned" Kittie's attempts at an earlier tour of Canada and pushed for touring the United States instead, but said they did not want to come off as "neglecting" the country.) Ben Rayner of the Toronto Star believed Spit's earlier release in the United States and Europe compared to Canada was a "double-edged sword" and led to Kittie being rejected in the country, whilst Morgan felt the band were "shunned" by Canadian journalists for being "younger women playing rock music".

== Aftermath ==
You hear the name Kittie, and a lot of people still think and feel like 'Oh, those are those 15-year old girls from London, Ontario.' Unfortunately, in the public eye, that's who we are, and that's who we'll always be. The media tends to choose one angle and just hammers it. You can never change and you can never develop—at least in their eyes, anyway.

— Morgan Lander, 2004

Much of the contemporary media attention surrounding Spit focused on the ages of Kittie's members and their status as an all-female band playing heavy metal, often at the expense of discussion of their music. Kittie had not expected their all-female status to be controversial and insisted on being referred to as just a band instead of being categorized by gender. Mercedes felt Kittie received "the wrong kind of press" initially and were presented as being "more mainstream" by journalists who did not do proper research on the band, and later claimed Artemis revealed its members' ages to the press against their wishes. In later years, Morgan and Mercedes felt Spit had created a stigma around Kittie. In a 2012 interview with Canada Arts Connect, Morgan said that Kittie had "received more praise and criticism for [Spit] than we have over the duration of our entire careers" and that, despite the growth she felt the band made thereafter, continued to be perceived based on the album and struggled to be taken seriously by the heavy metal community. Upon the release of Kittie's seventh album Fire (2024)—by which point interest in the band had been renewed by the early 2020s nu metal revival—Morgan said in an interview with Revolver that she was more accepting of Spit though also hoped the renewed attention would lead people to listen to their other albums, which she felt were talked about less as they weren't "piggybacking on the early 2000 nu-metal hype".

Kittie's later albums abandoned the nu metal style of Spit in favour of a more direct heavy metal style. The band continued to perform songs from the album at their shows, though Morgan said they avoided doing so for a time to show people "who we are now and what we have accomplished since then". In March 2012, Kittie hinted at the possibility of their original lineup reuniting to perform Spit in its entirety for a few shows. On October 27, 2017, the original Kittie lineup reunited to perform "Brackish", "Charlotte", "Choke", and "Paperdoll" as part of an anniversary concert at the premiere of the band's Kittie: Origins/Evolutions documentary at Rum Runners in London, Ontario. The concert marked the first time the former two songs had been performed live since 2008; "Choke" had not been performed since 2001, and "Paperdoll" since 2002. The Spit line-up reunited again in January 2022 for an online chat in celebration of the 22nd anniversary of its release. In April 2022, the album was reissued on vinyl for the first time. In 2023, Kittie performed "Do You Think I'm a Whore?" for the first time since 2003 at the Sick New World festival. On September 19, 2025, Kittie released Spit XXV, an extended play featuring re-recordings of four of the album's songs, through Sumerian Records; the EP was also produced by Richardson. The day after, the band are due to perform a set celebrating Spit's 25th anniversary at the Louder than Life festival.

== Track listing ==
All songs are written by Morgan Lander, Mercedes Lander, and Fallon Bowman (SOCAN), and credited to Kittie.

Standard release
No.	Title	Length
1.	"Spit"	2:20
2.	"Charlotte"	3:56
3.	"Suck"	3:31
4.	"Do You Think I'm a Whore?"	3:00
5.	"Brackish"	3:06
6.	"Jonny"	2:24
7.	"Trippin'"	2:21
8.	"Raven"	3:25
9.	"Get Off (You Can Eat a Dick)"	2:52
10.	"Choke"	4:05
11.	"Paperdoll"	3:22
12.	"Immortal"	2:49
Total length:		37:23

Japanese edition bonus track
No.	Title	Length
13.	"Charlotte" (Mellow Acoustic Version)	3:46
Total length:		41:09

Notes

- On advance copies of Spit, "Paperdoll" is listed as track 3 and "Choke" as track 11; the album's duration is 36:55.
- The lyrics of "Choke" were written by Fallon Bowman.
- The lyrics of "Paperdoll" were written by Tanya Candler; Candler sings on the original version of the song, which was re-recorded prior to Spit's official release.

== Personnel ==
Adapted from liner notes.

Kittie
- Morgan Lander – vocals, guitar, bass on "Raven" and "Immortal"
- Fallon Bowman – guitar, vocals
- Tanya Candler – bass, vocals on "Paperdoll" (original)
- Mercedes Lander – drums
- Talena Atfield – bass on "Paperdoll" (re-recording)

Additional musicians

- DJ Dave – loops and beats on "Brackish"

Artwork

- Larry Busacca – photography
- Nicky Guilfoil – live shot
- Michael McLaughlin – photography
- Brandy Stephen – paintings
- Kitten – artwork
Production
- Garth Richardson – engineer, producer
- Rob Nation – engineer
- Chris Shaw – mixing (at Soundtrack & EMAC)
- Matt Chiaravalle – editing on "Brackish", recording, mixing on "Paperdoll"
- Andrew Grimo – production assistant
- Ben Kaplan – production assistant
- Howie Weinberg – mastering (at Masterdisk)

== Charts ==
=== Weekly charts ===
Chart (2000)	Peak position
US Billboard 200	79
US Top Heatseekers Albums (Billboard)	1
US Top Independent Albums (Billboard)	2

=== Year-end charts ===
Chart (2000)	Peak position
US Billboard 200	191
US Top Independent Albums (Billboard)	5

== Certifications ==
Region	Certification	Certified units/sales
United States (RIAA)	Gold	660,000

== Bibliography ==
- Anon. (January 29, 2000). "Billboard 200 Continued". Billboard. Vol. 112, no. 5. p. 96. ISSN 0006-2510.
- Anon. (April 3, 2000). "News". CMJ New Music Report. Vol. 62, no. 660. pp. 32, 39. ISSN 0890-0795. Archived from the original on March 25, 2023.
- Anon. (June 2, 2000). "Post Modern: Upcoming New Releases" (PDF). HITS. Vol. 14, no. 696. p. 42. OCLC 15994494. Archived (PDF) from the original on February 1, 2023 – via worldradiohistory.com.
- Anon. (January 7, 2000). "Going for Adds" (PDF). R&R. No. 1332. p. 96. ISSN 0277-4860. Archived (PDF) from the original on January 31, 2023 – via worldradiohistory.com.
- Anon. (November–December 2000). "SOCAN Honours Kreviazuk, Kittie" (PDF). Canadian Musician. Vol. 22, no. 6. p. 15 – via worldradiohistory.com.
- Alexander, Phil (January 22, 2000). "Cat Scratch Fever". Kerrang!. No. 785. EMAP. p. 44. ISSN 0262-6624.
- Avery, David M. (December 13, 1999). "Kittie: Kittie 3 Song Sampler (Ng-Artemis)". CMJ New Music Report. Vol. 60, no. 646. p. 24. ISSN 0890-0795.
- Beaumont, Mark (July 5, 2000). "'We Have Female Groupies'". Melody Maker. Vol. 77, no. 27. IPC. pp. 22–25. ISSN 0025-9012.
- Begai, Carl (April 2007). "Kittie: Life After Death". Brave Words & Bloody Knuckles. No. 102. pp. 32–33. ISSN 1705-3781.
- Bouw, Brenda (February 8, 2000). "Why so angry, girls?: Heavy metal band Kittie has been described as 'the sort of girls who beat up the Britney Spears of the world for lunch money, then cut class to smoke in the parking lot'". National Post. p. B2. ProQuest 329623921.
- Bouw, Brenda (February 17, 2001). "Hard rock cachet: their debut album, Spit, made Kittie a heavy-metal sensation". Saturday Night. Vol. 116, no. 6. p. 24. ProQuest 222362346.
- Campbell, Chuck (January 28, 2000). "Kittie spits venomous teen spirit". Knoxville News Sentinel. p. 8. ProQuest 393490230.
- Comer, M. Tye (January 24, 2000). "Kittie Claws Its Way Onto the Airwaves". CMJ New Music Report. Vol. 61, no. 650. pp. 1, 37. ISSN 0890-0795.
- Devlin, Mike (February 29, 2000). "CD Reviews". Times Colonist. Victoria, British Columbia. p. B8. ISSN 0839-427X. ProQuest 345765351.
- Earnest, Mark (February 18, 2000). "CD Rack". Reno Gazette-Journal. p. G20. ProQuest 910986708.
- Elfman, Doug (January 19, 2001). "Furry Fury". Las Vegas Review-Journal. p. 28J. ProQuest 260107838.
- Farber, Jim (March 13, 2000). "This Young Kittie is Anything but Nice: 'Loud and vulgar' Canadian quartet is ferociously female". New York Daily News. p. 44. ProQuest 313715648.
- Finn, Timothy (January 26, 2001). "More Grrr than Purr". The Kansas City Star (Preview). p. 20 – via newspapers.com.
- Fissure, Lalena (January 15, 2003). "Whiskers in the Dark: Kittie Safe Artemis". The Village Voice. p. 127. ProQuest 232293759.
- Harmon, Rod (April 28, 2000). "Kittie doesn't purr, it growls". The Bradenton Herald (Weekend). p. 18 – via newspapers.com.
- Hay, Carla (March 25, 2000). "Artemis' Teen Rockers Kittie Claw Up the Billboard 200". Billboard. Vol. 112, no. 13. pp. 13, 16. ISSN 0006-2510.
- Hefflon, Scott (2000). "Kittie". Juggernaut. No. 3. Orlando: Implosion Publishing Inc. pp. 32, 34–37. OCLC 858943196 – via Internet Archive.
- Higgins, Polly (May 4, 2000). "Kittie sinks its claws into KMFA". Tucson Citizen (Calendar). pp. 17–18. ISSN 0888-5478 – via newspapers.com.
- Horn, David (Winter 2003). "Kittie". Sounds of Death. No. 20. Independent Media International, Inc. pp. 3–4. OCLC 30316499.
- Johnson, Beth (February 11, 2000). "The Week: Music". Entertainment Weekly. No. 525. p. 74. ISSN 1049-0434.
- Kelly, Jim (November–December 2000). "Kittie (Cover Story)" (PDF). Canadian Musician. Vol. 22, no. 6. pp. 45–47 – via worldradiohistory.com.
- Klosterman, Chuck (July 20, 2000). "Canada's Kittie is long on sound, short on explanations". The Akron Beacon Journal. p. E14 – via newspapers.com.
- Lingley, Scott (August 31, 2000). "Kittie flouts metal stereotypes". See. No. 352. p. 7. ISSN 1196-5347 – via Internet Archive.
- Martinez, Victor R. (July 19, 2002). "Kittie". El Paso Times (Tiempo). p. 15 – via newspapers.com.
- Marymont, Mark (January 10, 2000). "Kittie's Got Claws: Band Plays Juke Joint Tonight". The Springfield News-Leader. p. 5B – via newspapers.com.
- McCallum, Rob (director) (2017). Kittie: Origins/Evolutions (Motion picture). Canada: Lightyear Entertainment.
- McCormick, Neil (February 24, 2000). "Meet the anti-Spice Girls". The Daily Telegraph. p. 26. ISSN 0307-1235 – via newspapers.com.
- McCoy, Heath Jon (September 3, 2000). "Kittie may not be a pussycat, but they're every headbanger's dream". Calgary Herald. p. D6. ProQuest 244845430.
- Morse, Steve (May 25, 2000). "Kittie Spit Artemis Records". Boston Globe. p. CAL8. ProQuest 405338000.
- Muirhead, Stuart (April 2000). "Albums". Select. p. 93. ISSN 0959-8367 – via selectmagazinescans.monkeon.co.uk.
- Popoff, Martin (2007). The Collector's Guide to Heavy Metal: Volume 3: The Nineties. Burlington, Ontario, Canada: Collector's Guide Publishing. pp. 230–231. ISBN 978-1-894959-62-9.
- Rayner, Ben (April 10, 2000). "Here Kittie, Kittie; After touring in the U.S., the heavy metal girl band Kittie is finally being noticed back home". Toronto Star. p. 1. ProQuest 438116188.
- Sadler, Darren (March 2000). "Under the Hammer". Metal Hammer. No. 72. UK: Future plc. p. 85. ISSN 1464-7834.
- Sciarretto, Amy, ed. (December 2007). "Hit Parader's Ultimate Hard Rock Top 10's". Hit Parader. No. 513. Magna Publishing Group. p. 64. ISSN 0162-0266 – via Internet Archive.
- Sculley, Allan (May 12, 2000). "'Spit' and polish". Asbury Park Press (Alive). p. 14 – via newspapers.com.
- Sexton, Paul (February 3, 2001). "Artemis Finds Success In Europe". Billboard. Vol. 113, no. 5. pp. 66, 74. ISSN 0006-2510.
- Semon, Craig S. (February 6, 2000). "Metalwise, this Kittie's the cat's meow". Telegram & Gazette. Worcester, Massachusetts. p. 8. ProQuest 268751305.
- Sharpe-Young, Garry (2007). "Kittie". Metal: The Definitive Guide. Jawbone Press. pp. 471–472. ISBN 978-1-906002-01-5 – via Internet Archive.
- Shea, Eric (August 2000). "Kittie". Guitar Player. Vol. 34, no. 8. Miller Freeman Inc. p. 45. ISSN 0017-5463. ProQuest 222434948.
- Siegler, Dylan (January 2000). "More Purr, Less Grrr" (PDF). CMJ New Music Monthly. No. 77. p. 13. ISSN 1074-6978 – via worldradiohistory.com.
- Slater, Rosanna (March 2000). "Pussy Galore". Rock Sound. No. 10. UK: Freeway Press. p. 95. ISSN 1465-0185.
- Slater, Rosanna (March 2000). "Reviews: Rock". Rock Sound. No. 10. UK: Freeway Press. p. 104. ISSN 1465-0185.
- Solomon, Michelle (February 6, 2000). "Sound Judgement". Detroit Free Press. p. K5. ProQuest 436238602.
- Sperounes, Sanda (September 8, 2000). "Kittie scratching for some respect: Teen metal band can't get airplay in own country". Edmonton Journal. p. E4. ProQuest 252756182.
- Stillman, Brian (December 2001). "Meow Mix". Guitar World. Vol. 21, no. 12. Harris Publications. pp. 62–64, 66, 102, 104. ISSN 1045-6295.
- Sullivan, Caroline (March 10, 2000). "Music: Pop CD releases". The Guardian. ProQuest 245500335.
- Udo, Tommy (2002). "8. Girl's Skool: Kittie". Brave Nu World. Sanctuary Publishing. pp. 143–147. ISBN 1-86074-415-X – via Internet Archive.
- Vincent, Nathalie (April 2000). "Kittie: Spit It Out". Rock Sound (in French). No. 79. Paris: Éditions Freeway S.A. pp. 40–42. ISSN 1241-1337.
- Vincent, Nathalie (April 2000). "Chroniques de Discs: Album du Mois" [Disc Chronicles: Album of the Month]. Rock Sound (in French). No. 79. Paris: Éditions Freeway S.A. p. 65. ISSN 1241-1337.
- Waller, Don (April 10, 2000). "Artemis records shuns 'next-quarter' thinking". Variety. Vol. 378, no. 8. p. 78. ProQuest 1286180922.
- Zaleski, Annie (October 15, 2004). "Re-energized Kittie is really cooking". The Plain Dealer. p. 10. ISSN 2641-4058 – via newspapers.com.
