= Lisa Marx =

American musician and artist

- Born: August 21, 1981 (age 44); Seattle, Washington, U.S.
- Origin: California, U.S.
- Genres: Hardcore punk, heavy metal, metalcore, industrial metal
- Occupation: Musician
- Instruments: Guitar, piano
- Years active: 2000–present

Lisa Marx (born August 21, 1981) is an American guitarist and classically trained pianist from California.

== Career ==
=== Music ===
In 2002, Marx joined the Seattle hardcore band To See You Broken as guitarist. This underground group was an all-female ensemble and shared the stage with many northwest hardcore bands such as Himsa, Champion, the Blood Brothers, Hardesty, Staygold, and Book of Black Earth. TSYB did several US tours, performing alongside Atreyu, Sworn Enemy, As I Lay Dying, Misery Signals, and Modern Life Is War among others. The band recorded and released a full-length album titled "A Thief, A Poet, An Enemy" in 2003 under Excursion Records in Seattle, Washington.

In April 2004, Marx was hired to play guitar with the Canadian heavy metal group Kittie. Marx toured the US with metal bands such as 36 Crazyfists, Candiria, August Burns Red, Crisis, Otep, and Chimaira and performed at several festivals with Shadows Fall, All That Remains, Clutch, and Helmet. In July 2004, during Marx's time with Kittie, the band released the album "Until the End" under Artemis Records, featuring the single "Into the Darkness". The band debuted the world premiere of the music video "Into the Darkness" while hosting MTV's Headbangers Ball in New York City on June 19, 2004. Shortly after returning to the United States in January 2005, the band performed in Mexico City. Due to Artemis' poor promotion of the album, the Lander sisters fell on financial difficulties and were unable to pay Marx and bassist Jennifer Arroyo. Upset, Marx left the band in February 2005, with Arroyo leaving not long after. Although Arroyo's departure was amicable, the Lander sisters considered Marx's departure a surprise.

In October 2005, Marx joined Sacramento, California based metalcore band Scars of Tomorrow as guitarist on a temporary basis for their US tours with Bury Your Dead and Terror. While touring with SOT, she encountered another opportunity, playing guitar for Australia/New Zealand based band Day of Contempt, then residing in Orange County, California.

In January 2006, Marx joined Day of Contempt as guitarist and went on a full US tour with Avenged Sevenfold and Bullets and Octane. Afterwards, singer Ben Coyte returned to Australia and the band reformed as the Dear & Departed. The newly refined band continued the European stretch of the tour with Avenged Sevenfold and Bullets and Octane in March 2006. Upon returning to the States, the band played local Orange County shows with mainstream bands AFI and 18 Visions. Marx left the band in August 2006 due to the change in direction since the band's original formation.

In July 2006, Marx was the tour manager for the rockabilly band Tiger Army under Superhero Artist Management for two consecutive west coast headlining tours, including an exclusive show with Social Distortion at the Colorado Red Rocks Amphitheater.

In 2009, Marx was approached by California deathcore band Winds of Plague to fill in on keyboards for their Australia/New Zealand tour with Arch Enemy and Suffocation in October/November. Marx was also featured on the industrial band Psyclon Nine's album, released September 9 called "We the Fallen" under Metropolis Records, performing a piano composition, as well as designing the album artwork.

In 2011, Marx became the guitarist and keyboardist in the industrial metal band the Witch Was Right. Their online debut in May 2012 featured the song S.K.Y. with guest vocals by Davey Havok of AFI. Marx left the band in August 2012, before their first appearance over a dispute with the singer of the Witch Was Right when she was informed she was not permitted to participate in her personal DJ project Trainwrecked, which had been scheduled to perform as the opening act for the Witch Was Right's debut show in Orange County, California.

In April 2012, Marx performed in a music video with the band Beasto Blanco, Chuck Garric's solo band.

In June 2012, Marx played guitar and DJ'ed in Trainwrecked with partner Tiffany Lowe at the Hollywood night club Bar Sinister, headlining with support from the industrial band God Module.

In 2013 and 2014, Marx appeared in ads for Guitar Center.

== Honorable recognition ==
- 2004, Marx hosted MTV2 Headbangers Ball to debut Kittie's music video "Into the Darkness" in New York City on June 19, 2004.
- 2004, Marx was a guest speaker on VH1's "Bad Girls" episode with the band Kittie in New York City.
- 2006, Marx was featured in Revolver Magazine as one of the sexiest women in metal.
- 2006, Marx was one of Peta2's Top 20 Sexiest Vegetarians.
- 2008, Marx was featured in a promotional video for the band Mötley Crüe's press conference in Hollywood, California.
- 2009, Marx was featured on the cover of photographer Jeremy Saffer's book Bring the Noise and 2010 calendar featuring such other artists as All That Remains, A Day to Remember, Jeffree Star, the Devil Wears Prada, Hatebreed, Behemoth, Shadows Fall, and Suicide Silence.
- October 2013, Marx appeared in a commercial promoting Converse shoes for Guitar Center.
- February 2014, Marx was featured in a Guitar Center promotional commercial.
