= Talena Atfield =

Canadian bassist

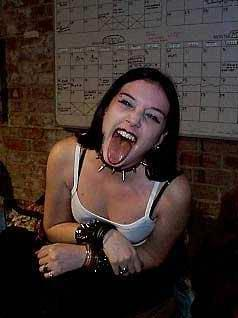

Background information
- Born: January 14, 1983 (age 43)
- Genres: Nu metal, industrial
- Occupation: Musician
- Instrument: Bass
- Years active: 1999–2009
- Formerly of: Kittie, Amphibious Assault

Talena A. L. Atfield (born January 14, 1983) is a retired Canadian bass guitarist and Indigenous persons historian of the University of Waterloo, best known as a former member of the heavy metal group Kittie.

== Early life ==
Atfield grew up in London, Ontario, the elder sister of two children. At age 14, she received her first guitar as a Christmas present from her parents, inspiring her to play music later on. She cites Bon Jovi, AC/DC, Kiss, and Guns N' Roses as influences, as her parents introduced her to their music at a young age. Throughout her youth, she would float around memberships with various bands as a guitarist and drummer, but none would persist past a few gigs.

== Career ==
=== With Kittie ===
In September 1999, after receiving a phone call from Mercedes Lander, the drummer for Kittie, Atfield was asked to replace Tanya Candler as their bassist had departed. Talena had been a supporter of Kittie and was happy to join them, so she learned how to play bass guitar in two weeks to go out to New York and film the video for their hit song, "Brackish". Atfield plays bass on the re-recording of "Paperdoll" on Kittie's debut album Spit (1999), which was reissued with new artwork featuring her in place of Candler in 2000. Atfield performed on their second album Oracle (2001) and the band's accompanying live appearances.

During her tenure with Kittie, her primary equipment consisted of an Ampeg SVT-CL amp (Spit and early Oracle era), an Ampeg B5R amp (later Oracle era), and an Ampeg SVT-810E cabinet as well as an LTD F-205 bass (early) and an LTD B-205 (later) during the Spit era, and a custom B.C. Rich Widow 5-string bass during the Oracle era. These pieces of equipment would be revoked after quitting the band. She initially used a pick, but switched to fingerstyle picking shortly before the Oracle era.

On March 18, 2002, Atfield left Kittie, and was replaced by ex-Spine member Jennifer Arroyo two days later. Atfield was involved in early photoshoots for the documentary film Kittie: Origins/Evolutions (2017), but ultimately declined to appear in the film.

=== After Kittie ===
Atfield was also a member of Fallon Bowman's Amphibious Assault industrial music project, and made contributions to album District Six and EP On Better Days And Sin-Eating in 2003 and 2006, respectively.

Atfield served on a judging panel for America's Hot Musician, a reality talent competition for instrumental musicians, alongside Duke Ellington Orchestra alumnus Gregory Charles Royal and National Symphony Orchestra violinist Marissa Regni. The show was to air on the Oxygen Network in July 2007. An attorney representing the current incarnation of Kittie served American Youth Symphony (producers of America's Hot Musician) a cease-and-desist letter for their use of clips from the band's video "What I Always Wanted" in the opening sequence of the show.

After retiring from the music industry in 2009, Atfield would go on to receive a doctorate In Anthropology at the University of Toronto, and currently specializes in Indigenous relations and history. In a July 2022 interview with Media Relations, it is revealed that she is a member of the Kanien'kehá:ka Nation of the Six Nations of the Grand River, an Indigenous peoples society primarily based in Canada.
