= Kittie: Origins/Evolutions =

- Theatrical release poster
- Directed by: Rob McCallum
- Written by: Rob McCallum
- Produced by: Rob McCallum
- Starring: Morgan Lander; Mercedes Lander; Fallon Bowman; Tanya Candler; Jeff Phillips; Jennifer Arroyo; Tara McLeod; Trish Doan; Ivana "Ivy" Jenkins
- Cinematography: Rob McCallum; Ryan Dawezewski; Kaila Jarmain; Chris Bucanac
- Edited by: Rob McCallum; Morgan Lander (sup); Mercedes Lander (sup)
- Production company: Pyre Productions
- Distributed by: Lightyear Entertainment; Universal Music Group
- Release dates: October 27, 2017 (Rum Runners); March 30, 2018 (United States)
- Running time: 94 minutes (theatrical release)
- Countries: Canada; United States
- Language: English

Kittie: Origins/Evolutions is a 2017 documentary film produced and directed by Rob McCallum. It follows the history of the Canadian heavy metal band Kittie, from their formation in 1996 and through their first six studio albums, from Spit (1999) to I've Failed You (2011). The film also includes interviews with the current, and most of the past, members of the band, interspersed with archival footage. Its production was funded by a successful Indiegogo campaign, which reached its goal within 8 hours, and ultimately raised more than $40,000. The film was dedicated to the memory of bassist Trish Doan, who died prior to the film's completion in February 2017.

Kittie: Origins/Evolutions premiered at Rum Runners in the band's hometown of London, Ontario on October 27, 2017, where the band also performed a career-spanning set. The film was released on March 30, 2018; its digital and theatrical release was handled by Lightyear Entertainment, whilst Caroline Records distributed the film as a three-disc box set, containing the film on DVD and Blu-ray formats along with a live CD from the band's premiere show. The film received generally positive reviews from critics.

== Production ==
The idea for Kittie: Origins/Evolutions was first conceived in 2013 by founding members Morgan and Mercedes Lander in order to celebrate the band's 20th anniversary, at a time when Kittie's future as a band remained uncertain. Production on Kittie: Origins/Evolutions began in early 2014, and on March 29, 2014, an Indiegogo campaign was set up to fund production of the documentary, as well as a tell-all book. The campaign's goal of CA$20,000 was met within eight hours, and went onto gross over $40,000. The band initially reached out to David Brodsky to direct the documentary, but he was unable to do so.

In January 2015, Kittie bassist Trish Doan reached out to Rob McCallum, asking if he would be interested in directing a documentary about the band. McCallum and Doan had been acquainted since college, and McCallum had previously reached out to Kittie eight months prior to obtain permission to use a Kittie song in one of his other documentaries, Nintendo Quest (2015). McCallum agreed, and quickly became frustrated with his research after finding that a lot of press coverage of the band "was really hung up on an apparent 'gender curiosity.' " He subsequently strove to avoid that, and gave the band a “rags to riches” story to work with. McCallum also sought to remove "any presence of himself" from the documentary, in order to give the band "a forum in which to tell their story, those events, from their very distinct perspective." McCallum filmed interviews with most of the band's current and former members, bar bassist Talena Atfield (who initially appeared in early photoshoots but then ultimately decided to not appear in the film) and guitarist Lisa Marx (who declined to participate in any capacity), between March and October 2015. McCallum also utilized a plethora of archival footage the band had recorded from the late 1990s to 2013.

The documentary's rough cut, from July 2015, lasted four hours long; by September 2015, McCallum had reduced its length to two-and-a-half hours, removing parts which were repetitious. Thereafter, the band and McCallum attempted to shop the film around to distributors. However, most distributors were unwilling to take on a film of its length, resulting in the idea of the film being split into two parts: "Kittie: Origins", detailing the band's beginnings, and "Kittie: Evolutions", about the band's progression and future. The film's title of Kittie: Origins/Evolutions was revealed in March 2016. By May 2016, "Origins" had a length of 90 minutes, whilst "Evolutions" had a length of 88 minutes.

Production became slower and more frustrating for McCallum and the Lander sisters during 2017, as further reductions were made to compile both "Origins" and "Evolutions" into a single, 94 minute film. Work was also affected by the death of Trish Doan on February 11, 2017. In August 2017, Kittie sold the documentary's worldwide rights to Lightyear Entertainment, with distribution from Universal Music Group.

== Reception ==
Kittie: Origins/Evolutions received generally positive reviews from critics. Denize Falzon of Exclaim! gave the documentary an 9 out of 10, stating that it did "an excellent job" at telling the band's "colourful and fascinating" story. Cryptic Rock's Jeannie Blue called it "Honest, sincere, and fully entertaining" and compared its style to VH-1's Behind the Music "due its professional and fair representation of Kittie’s career to date". Carl Fisher of GBHBL found it to be "very well made and interesting", but noted the absence of some finer details from Kittie's history, such as their 2003 lawsuit with Artemis Records. NM Mashurov of Stereogum was more mixed, feeling that by omitting the band's struggles as "teenage girls in an industry dominated by older men", the documentary played out like a "live-action Wikipedia article" that lacked "the context that gives a band’s narrative formidable historical weight."
