= Fallon Bowman =

Canadian rock musician (born 1983)

- Also known as: Amphibious Assault
- Born: 16 November 1983 (age 43); Cape Town, South Africa
- Origin: London, Ontario, Canada
- Genres: Nu metal, industrial
- Occupation: Musician
- Instruments: Guitar, vocals
- Years active: 1996–present
- Formerly of: Kittie, Pigface
- Website: www.fallonbowman.com

Fallon Bowman (born 16 November 1983) is a South African-Canadian guitarist and singer, best known for her time as the guitarist in the metal band Kittie. Since departing Kittie in 2001, Bowman has worked with Pigface and as a solo artist under the name Amphibious Assault, as well as under her own name.

== Musical career ==
At age 14, Bowman co-founded Kittie with classmate Mercedes Lander and Mercedes' sister, Morgan Lander. She played guitar and performed background vocals for the band as heard on their Spit album and the Paperdoll EP. She left Kittie in August 2001.

In 2003, Bowman came across the term amphibious assault in a Tom Clancy novel and thought it would be a great name for an industrial band. She then recorded several tracks with Pigface for the band's 2003 album Easy Listening. Her enjoyment of the recording experience led her to begin writing music again. She purchased a sequencer and began exploring the industrial music genre. Bowman filled her basement with drum machines and synthesizers and wrote the songs that made up Amphibious Assault's debut album, District Six, released on the Social Unrest label. Bowman's former Kittie bandmate, bassist Talena Atfield, and guitarist Pete Henderson also contributed to the project.

Amphibious Assault's second album was completed and originally scheduled for a June, and later, an August 2005 release. The release was postponed on both occasions, largely due to Bowman's school schedule which also caused her to miss her scheduled live appearances with Pigface. On 10 January 2007, Bowman announced via the Amphibious Assault website, that the second album, On Better Days and Sin-Eating, was available for purchase. The album was limited to 500 physical copies but was also made available via digital download.

In 2011, Bowman founded The Grace Dynasty, a five-piece band that included Rhim of The Birthday Massacre on drums. The band played a series of live shows before announcing their debut album. After recording was completed, the decision was made to drop the band name and release the album under Bowman's name. The album, Human Conditional, was released on 25 January 2011.

In November 2016, Bowman participated in Pigface's two-night 25th anniversary event in Chicago. In November 2019, Bowman joined Pigface for a concert at Toronto's Lee's Palace.

In January 2021, Bowman announced the return of Amphibious Assault, as well as a new album, titled Simulacrima. The album was released digitally on 12 February 2021, with physical copies made available a few months later.

In January 2022, Amphibious Assault released the single "Death Ship".

== Other work ==
In 2010, Bowman was the subject of a prank for an episode of the Animal Planet series Freak Encounters. The episode reveals that she has a degree in archaeology. Bowman has also appeared in commercials and films.

== Discography ==
=== As Amphibious Assault ===
- District Six (2003), Social Unrest
- On Better Days and Sin-Eating (EP) (2006), Social Unrest
- Simulacrima (2021), Self Released
- "Death Ship" (Single) (2022), Self Released
- "Borders of Distant Worlds - Part One" (EP) (2023), Self Released
- "Borders of Distant Worlds - Part Two" (EP) (2024), Self Released

=== As Fallon Bowman ===
- Human, Conditional (2011), Social Unrest

=== With Kittie ===
- Spit (1999), Artemis Records
- Paperdoll EP (2000), Artemis Records

=== With Pigface ===
- Easy Listening... (2003), Underground Inc.
