= Kittie =

Canadian metal band

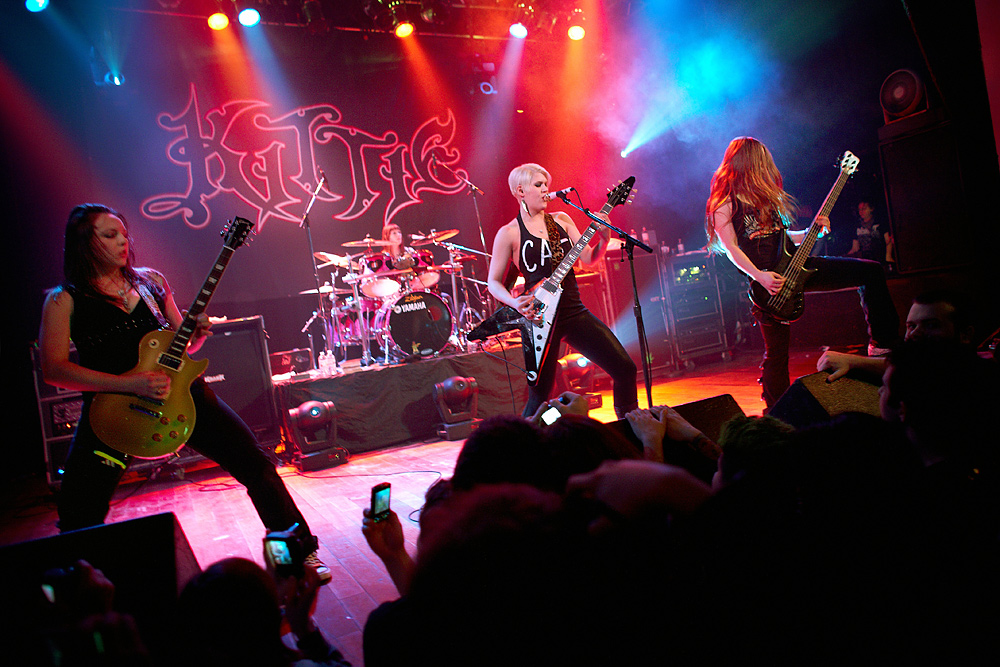
- Kittie performing in 2010

Background information
- Origin: London, Ontario, Canada
- Genres: Alternative metal; groove metal; death metal; nu metal
- Works: Discography
- Years active: 1996–2017; 2022–present
- Labels: Ng; Artemis; Rock Ridge; X of Infamy; MRV; eOne; Massacre; Caroline; Sumerian
- Members: Morgan Lander; Mercedes Lander; Tara McLeod; Ivana "Ivy" Jenkins
- Past members: Tanya Candler; Fallon Bowman; Talena Atfield; Lisa Marx; Jennifer Arroyo; Trish Doan
- Website: kittie.net

Kittie is a Canadian heavy metal band from London, Ontario, formed in 1996 by guitarist Fallon Bowman and drummer Mercedes Lander. Guitarist and vocalist Morgan Lander and bassist Tanya Candler joined the following year. Morgan and Mercedes have remained the band's sole constant members. Their current lineup features guitarist Tara McLeod and bassist Ivana "Ivy" Jenkins. As of 2026, Kittie are estimated to have sold more than one or two million albums worldwide.

They chose the band name because it "seemed contradictory". After signing to Ng Records, Kittie released their debut album, Spit (2000), which Artemis Records gave a wider release the following year. The nu metal-sounding album sold at least 600,000 copies in the United States and was certified gold by the RIAA. Kittie's subsequent output, including Oracle (2001) and Until the End (2004), transitioned towards a heavier, more aggressive yet melodic sound featuring characteristics of alternative metal, groove metal and death metal. Neither album replicated the success of Spit, and Kittie left Artemis Records in 2005.

After leaving Artemis, Kittie created their own label, X of Infamy, and released their fourth album, Funeral for Yesterday, in 2007. In 2009, the band signed to eOne Music, with whom they released In the Black (2009) and I've Failed You (2011). After the release of I've Failed You, Kittie went on an indefinite hiatus and the band's members pursued other projects. In 2018, the documentary Kittie: Origins/Evolutions, chronicling the history of the band, was released to coincide with their 20th anniversary, followed by a one-off reunion concert. In 2022, Kittie reunited to perform at the Blue Ridge Rock and When We Were Young festivals. Their first album in 13 years, Fire, was released on June 21, 2024, through Sumerian Records.

== History ==
=== Formation and early years (1996–2004) ===
Kittie was formed in September 1996 when guitarist Fallon Bowman and drummer Mercedes Lander met in a gymnastics class. Four or five months after the band's formation, Mercedes' sister Morgan joined as vocalist and guitarist. Bassist Tanya Candler completed the line-up in November 1997. Kittie recorded their first demos and began playing concerts in 1998. The band performed at Call the Office and the Embassy and signed up for Canadian Music Week in 1999. Kittie approached Jason Wyner, second-in-command at NG Records. After Wyner saw the band perform live, NG Records signed Kittie in 1999. Kittie released their debut album Spit on NG Records on January 11, 2000;, shortly after, Artemis Records purchased NG and production was halted. Around the same time, bassist Candler left the band and was replaced with Talena Atfield. Artemis reissued Spit, with different artwork and photographs, on January 11, 2000. It is the band's most successful album, certified gold by the RIAA. Spit has sold at least 600,000 copies in the United States and at least 40,000 copies in Canada. They supported the album by touring with Slipknot.

Their debut album and supporting tour earned Kittie coverage in Metal Edge, whose readers voted Morgan Lander "Female Performer of the Year" and Spit in Your Eye "Home Video of the Year" in the magazine's 2000 Readers' Choice Awards. The band was voted "New Band of the Year", "Who's Going to be the Next Big Thing", and "Most Underrated Band", earning them five Metal Edge Readers' Choice Awards that year. On July 11, 2000, Kittie made the home video Spit in Your Eye, which featured interviews of the band and the band playing shows with Slipknot. Spit's success led Billboard to call Kittie "the most successful female band in modern metal" in December 2001.

Kittie began rehearsing new material in February 2001, and finished writing their second album, Oracle, by June. More aggressive than Spit, the album features elements of death metal and thrash metal. Morgan Lander noted the band members were only 14 years old when writing their debut album, and said, "We haven't written in 4 or 5 years." She acknowledged a change from their early days, stating, "Then we listened to bands like Nirvana, Silverchair, and Alice in Chains. Now we listen to stuff like Cannibal Corpse and Nile." The band continued to write in the same fashion, first composing the music and then using that "as the backdrop behind the vocals." Weeks before the album was due to be recorded, Bowman left Kittie due to creative differences with Morgan and her own struggles dealing with the band's pressures for success. They have since reconciled. As a result of her departure, Morgan recorded the album's guitar tracks herself. In August 2001, Artemis Records announced that Kittie would continue as a three-piece (Bowman was not named in the statement) and that the band's guitar tech, Jeff Phillips, would fill in as a touring guitarist. Released in November 2001, the album shipped almost 220,000 copies in the United States by 2004.

On March 18, 2002, bassist Talena Atfield left the band and Jennifer Arroyo replaced her two days later. In April 2003, Kittie and Garth Richardson sued Artemis over unpaid royalties of $900,000 and eleven breaches of contract. The dispute was settled out of court in March 2004. In 2004, the group added guitarist Lisa Marx, and Jeff Phillips went to work full-time on his side project, Thine Eyes Bleed. On July 27, 2004, Kittie released their third studio album, Until the End.

=== Departure from Artemis and Funeral for Yesterday (2005–2007) ===
On March 23, 2005, Morgan Lander reported that Lisa Marx and Jennifer Arroyo had left the band. Arroyo's split was amicable while Marx's came as a surprise. Morgan cited financial difficulties, which they attributed to Artemis Records' poor promotion of their releases, as the reasons for both members' departures. Lander revealed that Artemis and the band were negotiating over whether the band's contract would be renewed, expressing her desire to leave the label. Arroyo confirmed that the split was amicable, and cited her desire to work outside of Kittie full-time was an additional factor. She joined Billy Graziadei of Biohazard in the band Suicide City. On March 31, 2005, Kittie left Artemis Records due to "a proposed amendment to the recording budget for the pending fourth Kittie album."

In 2005, Kittie added guitarist Tara McLeod and bassist Trish Doan. In 2005, Morgan and Mercedes Lander launched their clothing line, Poisoned Black. Morgan and Mercedes appeared briefly in the documentaries Metal: A Headbanger's Journey and Heavy Metal - Louder than Life. On February 7, 2006, Kittie released the Never Again EP through Rock Ridge Music. Also in 2006, Morgan Lander sang on the track "It Turns to Rust", from the album In the Arms of Devastation, by Canadian death metal band Kataklysm.

Kittie created their own label, Kiss of Infamy Records, and used it to release their fourth studio album. The label name was changed to "X of Infamy" after a cease-and-desist letter from attorneys representing Kiss Catalog Ltd. (the owner of the intellectual property rights pertaining to the musical group Kiss) alleging that the Kiss of Infamy trademark was "confusingly similar" to their client's trademark. Kittie's fourth studio album, Funeral for Yesterday, was released on February 20, 2007, through their record label. Along with the release of Funeral for Yesterday, Morgan Lander announced that Kittie would release a 45-minute-DVD with the CD. In February 2007, Kittie toured as part of the Funeral for Yesterday Tour alongside Walls of Jericho, 36 Crazyfists, Dead To Fall, and In This Moment. Doan left Kittie following the tour due to her struggles with anorexia athletica-nervosa, which she developed during the recording of Funeral for Yesterday. From July 6 to September 16, 2007, Kittie headlined a tour of the United States, the Sweet Revenge Tour, with It Dies Today, Silent Civilian, Bring Me the Horizon and Blessed by a Broken Heart. Jeff Phillips filled in on bass for the tour. Soon after, Ivy Vujic officially became the new bass player.

=== In the Black and I've Failed You (2008–2011) ===
On August 2, 2008, David Lander, father of band members Morgan and Mercedes and the band's manager, died of a heart attack.

On June 26, 2009, it was announced that Kittie signed to the E1 Music record label. The band's fifth studio album, In the Black, was released on September 15, 2009. Videos were shot for the singles "Cut Throat" and "Sorrow I Know". "Cut Throat" premiered on MTV 2's Headbangers Ball on September 5, 2009, and on the Canadian show Much Loud on September 20, 2009. "Cut Throat" appeared on the Saw VI soundtrack, released on October 20, 2009, and in Diary of a Wimpy Kid: Rodrick Rules, released on March 25, 2011. On September 16, 2009, it as announced that German label Massacre Records would distribute In the Black in Europe.

In January 2010, Kittie returned to Europe to promote In the Black. Supporting bands on the tour included It Dies Today and Malefice. This tour included dates in the United Kingdom, France, Switzerland, Denmark, Belgium, Germany, Italy and the Netherlands. In a January 27, 2010 interview, Morgan Lander revealed that the band was in talks to film a video for the track "Die My Darling". In March 2010, Kittie toured North American with God Forbid, Periphery and Gwen Stacy as support. From May through June 2010, Kittie took part in the Happy Daze tour headlined by Insane Clown Posse and featuring Coolio, Kottonmouth Kings and Necro.

Kittie participated in the 2010 Thrash and Burn tour through July and August, which featured Asking Alexandria, Born of Osiris, Evergreen Terrace, Stick to Your Guns, Chelsea Grin, Through the Eyes of the Dead, Impending Doom, Periphery and Greeley Estates. This was followed by a one-month stint opening for Devildriver's 2010 North American tour.

Kittie's sixth studio album, I've Failed You, was released on August 30, 2011. Videos were released for the songs "We Are the Lamb" and "Empires (Part 2)". In 2011, Mercedes Lander joined the all-female band the Alcohollys featuring former Kittie bassist Tanya Candler.

=== Documentary, death of Trish Doan, hiatus (2012–2020) ===
On February 13, 2012, Kittie announced that Ivy Vujic was resigning from the band and that Trish Doan would return. On September 7, 2013, Kittie performed at the Spread the Metal Festival at The Opera House in Toronto. The band became inactive following the performance, citing the rising costs of touring and writing new music. Morgan noted declining turnouts at the band's shows as a factor, with her and Mercedes feeling that Kittie had "overstayed [their] welcome" by the time I've Failed You was released. In 2017, Mercedes said Kittie was on an indefinite hiatus. In spite of their inactivity, the band did not announce that they had broken up. In 2024, McLeod said, "To admit that we were done would have been a really big heartbreak for all of us. None of us wanted to admit that even though we did overstay our welcome. We knew it was inevitable but maybe didn't want to admit it. All of us really gripped onto [Kittie] as a musical identity."

In early 2014, Kittie posted information about a secret project to their Facebook page. On March 8, Kittie posted photos on their Facebook and Instagram of past and present members together. On March 28, 2014, Kittie launched an Indiegogo campaign celebrating the band's impending 20th anniversary, with a DVD documentary featuring past and present members and a tell-all book. They reached their $20,000 goal in eight hours. The campaign closed on April 28, 2014, with a total of $40,525 raised, 203% of the initial goal. Kittie slated Rob McCallum to direct the documentary and Mark Eglinton to help pen the biography.

In April 2015, it was announced that Kittie would tour the United States in June 2015, as part of Ill Niño's the Civil Unrest Tour. A month before the tour, the band dropped out "due to unforeseen issues with immigration in the USA". In October 2015, Kittie released a cover of David Bowie's "Space Oddity", featured on the Cleopatra Records tribute album A Salute To The Thin White Duke - The Songs Of David Bowie. Morgan, Mercedes, and McLeod recorded the cover in a single day in December 2014 at Beach Road Studios with producer Siegfried Meier.

In October 2016, it was announced that drummer/vocalist Mercedes Lander had started the sludge/doom metal band the White Swan, which released the single "Illuminate". The debut EP, Anubis, was released on November 1, 2016.

On February 11, 2017, bassist Trish Doan died at the age of 31. Doan had moved to Australia in 2013 and had frequently used her social media accounts to speak of her frustrations with depression.

On August 30, 2017, the band announced that they would perform a three-set single concert on October 27, 2017, in their London, Ontario hometown in the London Music Hall, featuring three different line-ups made up of current and former members. The concert launched their 20th-anniversary documentary, and featured Candler, Bowman, Phillips, Arroyo and Vujic's return to perform songs from their respective eras. The concert was released on DVD on March 26, 2019.

On March 30, 2018, the documentary Kittie: Origins/Evolutions, filmed prior to the reunion concert, was released on Blu-ray and DVD. Atfield and Marx declined to participate. According to Morgan Lander, Atfield was supportive of the documentary, appearing in the initial crowdfunding pitch video, but "didn't think it was the right move for her" to appear. Packaged with the movie was a CD featuring a collection of live performances by the band.

In 2019, Morgan Lander expressed uncertainty about the band's future, the primary reason being that she didn't feel right moving forward without Doan. Several months later, it was announced that Lander had joined melodic death metal band Karkaos as their lead singer.

In October 2020, Mercedes Lander stated that it was unlikely that Kittie would reunite without a significant financial offer and the ability to include all of the band's former members. Like her sister, she also stated that she found it difficult to go forward without Doan.

=== Return to performing, Fire (2021–present) ===
In late 2021, coinciding with a resurgence in nu metal's popularity, bookers contacted Kittie to play several shows, prompting the band to officially end their hiatus in January 2022, with Jenkins rejoining the band on bass. On September 8, 2022, Kittie performed their first show since 2017 at the Blue Ridge Rock Festival at the Virginia International Raceway in Alton, Virginia. In October 2022, Kittie performed on all three days of the When We Were Young festival in Las Vegas, Nevada. After the festival, label head Ash Avildsen signed Kittie to Sumerian Records and they began working on new music in January 2023.

Kittie performing at Reload Festival 2026 in Sulingen, Germany

On May 13, 2023, Kittie performed their first new song in 12 years, "Vultures", at the Sick New World Festival in Las Vegas. On November 19, 2023, the band confirmed that they were recording a new album with producer Nick Raskulinecz at Sienna Studios in Nashville, Tennessee. On February 13, 2024, Kittie premiered the song "Eyes Wide Open" on SiriusXM's Liquid Metal channel. The following day, the band released the song as a single with a music video and announced that they had signed to Sumerian Records. Upon release, Consequence, Exclaim!, Metal Hammer and Revolver listed the song as one of the week's best. After the release of "Vultures", the band announced that their seventh album, Fire, would be released on June 21, 2024.

In 2025, Kittie released the EP Spit XXV, featuring re-recordings of four tracks from their debut album, Spit. In June 2026, the band headlined their first North American tour in more than a decade, the Legacy of Fire Tour, with Kingdom of Giants and Gore. Rachel Gonzales of Neon Knights filled in on bass for the tour, as Jenkins was unable to perform due to family commitments. Gonzales had filled in on bass for Kittie's performances aboard the ShipRocked music cruise in January 2026. The band reunited with Jenkins before touring Europe in August. In November 2026, Kittie released the Oracle XXV EP, featuring re-recordings of the Oracle tracks "Mouthful of Poison" and "What I Always Wanted".

In March 2027, Kittie is scheduled to tour Europe supporting Carpenter Brut.

== Musical style and influences ==
Kittie has been put under multiple genres of music. They have been categorized as nu metal, alternative metal, heavy metal, death metal, extreme metal, groove metal, thrash metal, gothic metal, punk, and hard rock. Kittie has often used death metal and black metal vocals in their songs and often had clean singing in those songs as well. On the Spit album, Kittie used screaming, clean singing and rapping. Kittie have been compared to bands such as Pantera, Slayer, and Mudvayne.

Kittie's formative influences were based within the Seattle grunge scene; Morgan Lander has stated that when Kittie made Spit, the band were listening to bands such as Silverchair, Alice in Chains, and Nirvana. Later on, when Morgan joined the band, Kittie transitioned from a grunge band into a nu metal band, taking inspiration from recent releases of the time by Korn, Deftones and Sepultura. When asked about their influences in an interview with Metal Maidens in 1999, the members of Kittie cited Nile, Today Is the Day, Placebo, Far, Weezer, Orgy, Fear Factory, Hole, Tura Satana, Human Waste Project, Babes in Toyland, Misfits, Blondie, and Nasum as influences. With the release of Oracle, Kittie abandoned the nu metal style found on Spit in favour of a more extreme metal sound. In interviews, Morgan has cited Marilyn Manson, Korn, Metallica, Cannibal Corpse, Nile, Carcass, At the Gates, Acid Bath, and Testament as influences on the band.

== Legacy ==
Tiny Mix Tapes called Kittie "probably the best known all-female band of the [nu metal] era", and various publications have described the band as influential to women in rock and metal. In 2004, ROCKRGRL named them one of the most influential all-female bands of all time. The band have been cited as an inspiration by Djamila Bozen Azzouz of Ithaca, Lzzy Hale, Serena Cherry (Svalbard and Noctule) Ari May of Faetooth, Crypta, and Poppy, whilst Demi Lovato and Caroline Polachek are fans of the band. Princess Nokia has called Kittie her favourite metal band of all time, and included the band in the music video for "Dragons", from her debut album Metallic Butterfly (2014). In 2016, OC Weekly listed Kittie as the eighth-best Canadian metal band.

As of 2026, Kittie is estimated to have sold more than one or two million albums worldwide, making them one of the best-selling bands to come from London, Ontario.

== Band members ==
Current members
- Morgan Lander – lead vocals, guitar, piano (1996–2017, 2022–present)
- Mercedes Lander – drums (1996–2017, 2022–present), backing vocals (2005–2017, 2022–present)
- Tara McLeod – guitar (2005–2017, 2022–present)
- Ivana "Ivy" Jenkins – bass (2007–2012, 2017, 2022–present)

Touring members

- Jeff Phillips – guitar, backing vocals (2001–2003, 2017), bass (2007)
- Rachel Gonzales – bass (2026)
Past members
- Fallon Bowman – guitar, backing vocals (1996–2001, 2017)
- Tanya Candler – bass, backing vocals (1997–1999, 2017)
- Talena Atfield – bass (1999–2002)
- Jennifer Arroyo – bass (2002–2005, 2017)
- Lisa Marx – guitar (2004–2005)
- Trish Doan – bass (2005–2007, 2012–2017; died 2017)

Timeline

== Awards and nominations ==
Juno Awards
Year	Nominee / work	Award	Result	Ref.
2001	Kittie	Best New Group	Nominated	
2025	Fire	Metal/Hard Music Album of the Year	Nominated	

Kerrang! Awards
Year	Nominee / work	Award	Result	Ref.
2000	Kittie	Best International Newcomer	Nominated	

Metal Edge Readers' Choice Awards
Year	Nominee / work	Award	Result	Ref.
2001	Morgan Lander	Female Performer of the Year	Won	
2001	Kittie	Female Performer of the Year	Nominated	
2001	Spit in Your Eye	Home Video of the Year	Won	
2001	Kittie	New Band of the Year	Won	
2001	Kittie	Who's Going to be the Next Big Thing	Won	
2001	Kittie	Most Underrated Band	Won	
2002	Mercedes Lander	Drummer of the Year	Nominated	
2002	Morgan Lander	Female Performer of the Year	Won	
2002	Kittie	Female Performer of the Year	Nominated	
2002	Talena Atfield (Note: Tied with Shavo Odadjian & Dave Ellefson)	Bassist of the Year	Nominated	
2002	Kittie	Most Underrated Band	Nominated	
2005	Kittie	Most Underrated Band	Won	

== Discography ==
Studio albums

- Spit (2000)
- Oracle (2001)
- Until the End (2004)
- Funeral for Yesterday (2007)
- In the Black (2009)
- I've Failed You (2011)
- Fire (2024)
