= Artemis Records =

Former American independent record label

- Parent company: MNRK Music Group
- Founded: June 1999
- Founder: Danny Goldberg
- Defunct: January 2007
- Genre: Pop, alternative, rock
- Country of origin: United States
- Location: New York City

Artemis Records was a New York–based independent record label, founded in June 1999 by Danny Goldberg with Daniel Glass as president, and closed in April 2006. The label was acquired by E1 Entertainment.

As of 2006, Artemis Records was owned by Sheridan Square Entertainment LLC (SSE), an independent music company then based in New York.

In November 2005, Richard Branson sold the North America division of his V2 Records label to SSE for $15 million. Sheridan Square then merged all of its labels, including Artemis Records, into V2 North America. V2 North America, and subsequently Artemis, was shuttered in January 2007 following a restructuring. In 2009, the newly formed IndieBlu Music Holdings LLC acquired SSE's business, including V2 North America, in a UCC foreclosure auction. IndieBlu was acquired by Entertainment One in 2010.

== Artists ==
- Baha Men
- Better Than Ezra
- Black Label Society
- Boston
- Confrontation Camp
- Cindy Bullens
- Crossbreed
- Dog Fashion Disco
- Dope
- Steve Earle
- Every Move a Picture
- The Fabulous Thunderbirds
- Jay Farrar
- The Firesign Theatre
- Flipp
- The Fugs
- Jeffrey Gaines
- Jaguar Wright
- Rickie Lee Jones
- Josh Joplin Group
- Khia
- Kittie
- Kurupt
- Little Barrie
- Lisa Loeb
- Lollipop Lust Kill
- Margot & the Nuclear So and So's
- Murphy's Law
- Alan Parsons
- The Pretenders
- Ruff Ryders
- Todd Rundgren
- The Spooks
- Stephan Smith
- Jill Sobule
- Spacehog
- Sugarcult
- Jimmie Vaughan
- Peter Wolf
- Warren Zevon
