= In the Black =

Studio album by Kittie
- Released: September 15, 2009
- Recorded: November–December 2008
- Studio: Beach Road (Goderich, Ontario)
- Genres: Groove metal; heavy metal; thrash metal
- Length: 41:00
- Label: E1 Music
- Producer: Siegfried Meier

Kittie chronology
Funeral for Yesterday (2007)	In the Black (2009)	I've Failed You (2011)

Singles from In the Black
- 1. "My Plague" Released: July 22, 2009; 2. "Cut Throat" Released: July 31, 2009; 3. "Sorrow I Know" Released: August 17, 2009

In the Black is the fifth studio album by Canadian heavy metal band Kittie, released on September 15, 2009, through E1 Music. It was the band's first album with bassist Ivy Jenkins, who had joined in 2007. The album was produced and recorded by Siegfried Meier at Beach Road Studios in Goderich, Ontario, in November and December 2008. A groove metal, heavy metal, and thrash metal album incorporating elements of black metal, melodic death metal and metalcore, Kittie intended In the Black to be the "antithesis" of their previous album Funeral for Yesterday (2007), whose production and style they were disappointed with.

Music critics praised Kittie's musicianship on In the Black, with some considering it their best album, though others found it unremarkable and lacking in originality. The album debuted at number 133 on the US Billboard 200 chart, selling 3,400 copies in its first week. Kittie toured in support of the album from September 2009 to September 2010, performing in North America and Europe. The band also joined the 2010 Thrash and Burn Tour and embarked on supporting tours with Insane Clown Posse and DevilDriver.

== Background and recording ==
In 2007, Kittie released their fourth album Funeral For Yesterday. Following the album's release, bassist Trish Doan left the band due to her worsening anorexia athletica-nervosa, which she developed during its production. After a tour with Jeff Phillips filling in on bass, Kittie recruited Ivana "Ivy" Jenkins as Doan's replacement. Kittie began "sketching out ideas" for In the Black whilst touring in the summer and fall of 2008. In July of that year, they played two new songs, "My Plague" and "Sorrow I Know", in Fayetteville, North Carolina. Vocalist and guitarist Morgan Lander and drummer Mercedes Lander described the songwriting process as more collaborative than that of Funeral for Yesterday; both members wrote most of the album's material together before seeking guitarist Tara McLeod's input, with Jenkins contributing basslines at the end. Mercedes credited McLeod and Jenkins with making the album sound "multi-dimensional and complete"; McLeod said she "realised her value in [Kittie]" when the band began using her riffs and guitar parts. Mercedes said that Kittie finished writing In the Black by August 2008, although Morgan said the band did not start to coalesce their ideas into songs until they left their record label later that year.

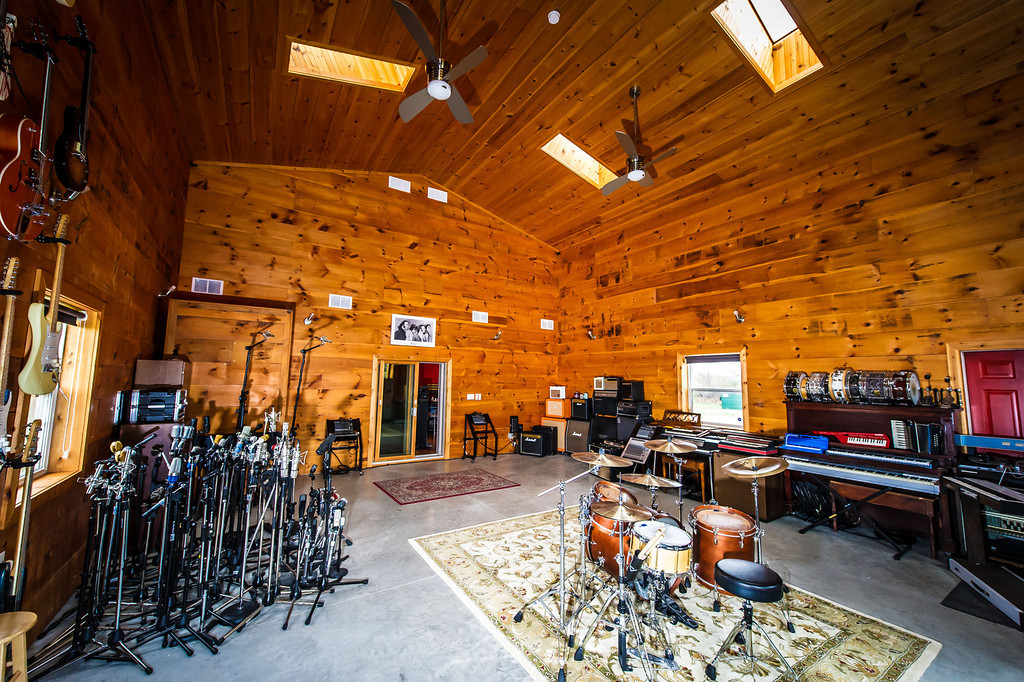
Kittie recorded In the Black at Beach Road Studios; the studio's tracking room is pictured.

Kittie recorded In the Black in three weeks between November and December 2008 with producer Siegfried Meier at his newly constructed Beach Road Studios in Goderich, Ontario. Meier had previously worked with Kittie as an assistant engineer on their second album Oracle (2001). He purchased a Studer A827 tape machine to record the album, though Mercedes' drum tracks were recorded digitally. Morgan would record two takes for her vocals and select the best one. Meier said that Kittie wanted to avoid having too many vocal harmonies and "glisteny, polished, airy things" on the album. Mercedes considered its recording to be closest to their debut album Spit (1999), in that Kittie "got to do exactly what we wanted, how we wanted it", and praised Meier's production, saying that he was "the first producer [Kittie have] worked with that knows metal and knows what we want to sound like. ... [In the Black] is the first album that we've recorded that I'm totally happy with."

== Composition ==
In the Black has been described as groove metal, heavy metal, and thrash metal. The album incorporates elements from black metal, melodic death metal, and metalcore, and mixes clean singing and crooning with black metal and death metal-inspired growls and screamed vocals. Its songs also feature guitar solos. Denize Falzon of Exclaim! described the album as combining 1970s classic rock and 1980s heavy metal with a "modern style" and compared McLeod's guitarwork to Testament's debut album, The Legacy (1987). Kittie intended it to be the "antithesis" of Funeral for Yesterday, whose production and style they were disappointed with. In an interview with Chart Attack, Morgan said that Kittie wanted to make a faster, rawer and "more outlandish" album representative of how they sounded live. The album's lyrics were written by Morgan and Mercedes, and detail personal situations and experiences they went through. Noisecreep's Amy Sciarretto attributed some of its "anger" to Kittie's split with their previous record label.

"My Plague"
The lead single from In the Black is a metalcore and groove metal song featuring "mammoth musical composition" and screaming.

In the Black begins with the instrumental guitar intro "Kingdom Come", followed by "My Plague", a metalcore and groove metal song featuring "mammoth musical composition" and screaming. "Cut Throat" incorporates southern rock grooves and "blackened" vocals from Morgan. In an interview with Reflections of Darkness, Morgan said that "Die My Darling" is "about hoping that someone you detest gets what they deserve". "Sorrow I Know" is driven by "sly, thunderous drums"; Ultimate Guitar considered its vocal range and pacing reminiscient of Kittie's debut album Spit (1999). Martin Popoff likened "Forgive and Forget" to a "moshable Dark Tranquility". "Now or Never" recalls 1980s thrash metal, with Michael Edele of laut.de comparing its verse riff to Metallica circa Kill 'Em All. Blabbermouth.net reviewer Keith Bergman cited "Falling Down" and "Sleepwalking" as songs representative of the "darker, slower, more brooding mood" of In the Black's second half. Kenada Quinlan of Time Off highlighted both songs for their more accessible nature compared to the rest of the album's material. The album closer "The Truth" begins with a "funeral hymn" intro before harkening back to Kittie's "roots of unadulterated, sludge-driven metal", per Quinlan. Edele compared its "bluesy" guitar solo and vocals to Drain STH.

The album's title is a play on the financial term "in the red". Mercedes said that being In the Black "doesn't mean you're clear of all your problems, but you're on your way to doing better. That's kind of how we [Kittie] feel right now [...] we're on our way towards making a full recovery." The album was Kittie's first since Spit to feature its members on the cover, and was intended to show the band's growth from the album. The album was dedicated to David Lander, Kittie's former manager and Morgan and Mercedes' father, who died in August 2008.

== Release and promotion ==
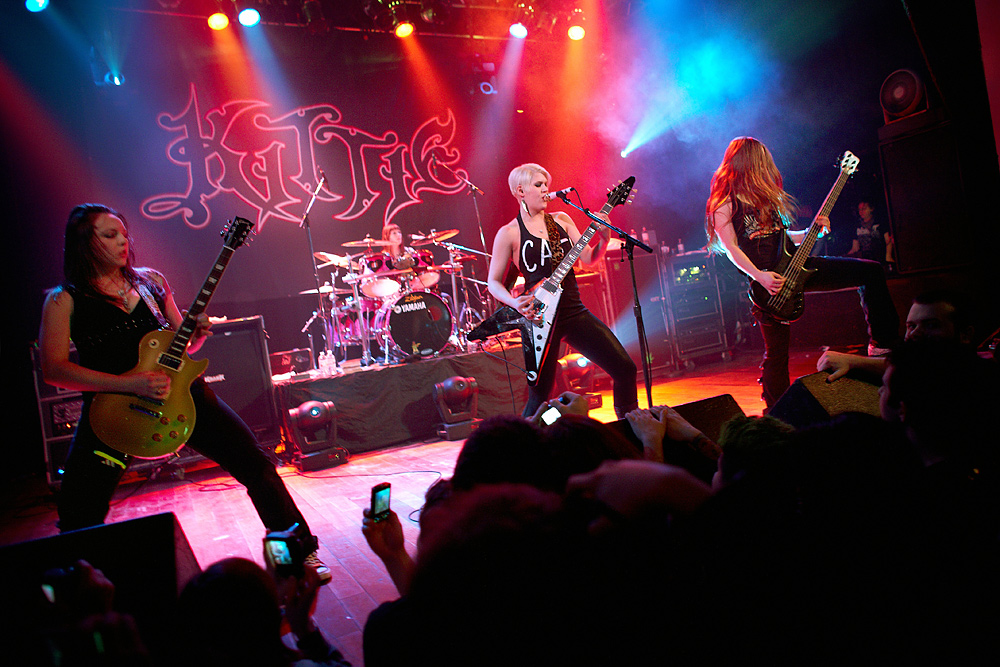
Kittie performing at the Opera House in Toronto in March 2010

On June 26, 2009, Kittie announced that they had signed a three-album record deal with E1 Music. The band chose to sign with the label as they had previously worked with a number of its personnel in the past, including its vice president of Metal, Scott Givens, whom they had known for over 10 years. On July 18, 2009, the band revealed the track listing for In the Black; Also in July 2009, Kittie worked with director David Brodsky on two music videos, for "Cut Throat" and "Sorrow I Know". The former features the band performing the song inside an abandoned department store in Brooklyn. The "Sorrow I Know" video was filmed at the Backroom in New York City on July 26, 2009. The band invited its fans to participate in the video shoot, which featured a 1920s speakeasy theme. On August 1, 2009, Kittie played at the Altered Skin Revolution festival in Saginaw, Michigan, where they performed "Cut Throat" live for the first time. "My Plague", "Cut Throat", and "Sorrow I Know" were uploaded to Kittie's MySpace between July and August 2009. "Cut Throat" debuted on SiriusXM's Liquid Metal station on August 31, 2009. The music video for "Cut Throat" was released on September 3, 2009. In the Black was released in the United States through E1 Music on September 15, 2009, and in Europe through Massacre Records on October 23, 2009. It was released as a CD and on vinyl, the latter in limited quantities. The album debuted at number 133 on the US Billboard 200 chart, selling 3,400 copies in its first week. The album also reached number 18 on the Billboard Top Hard Rock Albums chart and number 23 on the Billboard Top Independent Albums chart. Following its release, Kittie embarked on a headlining tour of the United States supported by Soil, Red Line Stitch and Arkaea from September 27 to October 29, 2009.

On January 14, 2010, the "Sorrow I Know" video premiered on Noisecreep, with an "uncut" version arriving on February 8, 2010. Also in January, Kittie toured Europe with It Dies Today and Malefice. Forever Never and Magnacult provided additional support on select dates. In March 2010, the band embarked on a co-headling tour of North America with God Forbid. Periphery and Gwen Stacy opened for both bands from March 3 to 11 and March 14 to 21, 2010, respectively. On May 4, 2010, Kittie filmed a music video for "Die My Darling" with director John Barber, which was released on June 7. Morgan and Mercedes initially planned the video as a spoof of the Quentin Tarantino film Death Proof (2007), and it "just turned into its own kind of thing". From May 10 to June 8, 2010, Kittie embarked on their first supporting tour since 2000, for Insane Clown Posse on their Happy Daze Tour. The tour was one of the last things David Lander organized for Kittie prior to his death; Violent J and Shaggy 2 Dope had previously invited the band to join their tours but they had turned them down. Although Kittie considered themselves an outlier as they were "the only band who played instruments", the tour went "unbelievably well" for the band, according to Morgan; Mercedes said the band managed to sell "a box of CDs per night" of the tour. From July 16 and August 15, 2010, Kittie participated in the 2010 Thrash and Burn Tour, featuring Asking Alexandria, Born of Osiris, Impending Doom and Motionless in White. From August 25 to September 25, 2010, the band supported DevilDriver on a tour of North America, alongside Kataklysm and Hostility. In March 2011, the band released a live music video for "My Plague".

== Critical reception ==
Professional ratings
Review scores
Source	Rating
About.com	4/5 stars
AllMusic	3.5/5 stars
Blabbermouth.net	7.5/10
Collector's Guide to Heavy Metal	8/10
laut.de	2/5 stars
Metal.de	6/10
Metal Rules	2.5/5
Rock Hard	8/10
Time Off	3/5 stars
Ultimate Guitar	7.3/10

According to James Reaney of The London Free Press, In the Black received "some of the best reviews in Kittie's decade-plus career". Some critics considered it to be the band's best album. Bergman of Blabbermouth.net and Rock Hard's Marcus Schleutermann both applauded the album's musical "conviction"; the former considered it to be "the biggest metal shock of 2009". Falzon of Exclaim! was surprised by the quality of the album's sound and songwriting, singling out Morgan's vocals and McLeod's "catchy riffs" for praise. Ultimate Guitar also highlighted Kittie's stronger musicianship and chemistry on the album and believed that the band had "perfected [the] formula [...] they've been mixing for nearly ten years".

James Christopher Monger of AllMusic stated that In the Black only "fortifies what [Kittie have] been standing on for the last decade". Waspman of Metal Rules considered it "relatively impressive as a step forward for Kittie", but "not [...] for anyone else", and felt the album as a whole lacked originality. The A.V. Club's Leonard Pierce and Time Off's Quinlan both highlighted the album's improved musicianship but criticized Morgan's vocals; the latter remarked that it "dances dangerously close to being swallowed amongst the mass produced." Edele of laut.de found its guitar solos were "sloppily or just cheaply [played]". Jan Wischkowski of Metal.de praisied the album's consistency but considered it only "above-average" due to a lack of standout tracks.

In The Collector's Guide to Heavy Metal: Volume 4: The '00s (2011), Popoff praised In the Black's grooves and variety and compared Kittie favourably with Sinergy. Paul Travers of Metal Hammer ranked it fifth out of band's seven studio albums, calling it their first to combine their melodic and aggressive sensibilities "into a single hulking whole." In a 2020 Reddit AMA, Morgan and Mercedes both named In the Black the Kittie album they are most proud of. In a 2025 interview with New Noise Magazine, Jenkins cited the album as the Kittie album she resonated most with.

== Track listing ==
All songs written by Kittie.

Standard release
No.	Title	Length
1.	"Kingdom Come"	1:29
2.	"My Plague"	3:05
3.	"Cut Throat"	2:55
4.	"Die My Darling"	2:46
5.	"Sorrow I Know"	3:30
6.	"Forgive and Forget"	3:44
7.	"Now or Never"	2:35
8.	"Falling Down"	3:08
9.	"Sleepwalking"	3:17
10.	"Whiskey Love Song"	4:29
11.	"Ready Aim Riot"	3:13
12.	"The Truth" (featuring Justin Wolfe)	6:41
Total length:		41:00

Taiwanese bonus track
No.	Title	Length
13.	"The Only"	5:19
Total length:		46:19

== Personnel ==
Adapted from CD liner notes.

Kittie
- Morgan Lander – lead vocals, guitars, piano
- Mercedes Lander – drums, percussion, backing vocals
- Tara McLeod – guitars
- Ivy Vujić – bass

Production

- Siegfried Meier – production, mixing, engineering
- T-Roy – mastering (at Spectre Studios)
Artwork
- Dale May – cover and insert photography
- Paul Grosso – creative direction & design
- Gregory Alan – hairstylist
- Dahlia Warner – make-up

== Charts ==
Chart performance for In the Black
Chart (2009)	Peak position
US Billboard 200	133
US Top Hard Rock Albums (Billboard)	18
US Top Independent Albums (Billboard)	23

== Release history ==
Release history for In the Black
Region	Label	Format	Date	Catalog #	Ref.
United States	E1 Music	CD; LP; DD	September 15, 2009	KOC-CD-2050	
Australia	Shock Entertainment	CD; DD	September 18, 2009	KOCCD2050	
Europe	Massacre Records	CD; LP; DD	October 23, 2009	MAS CD0672	
