= I've Failed You =

Studio album by Kittie
- Released: August 30, 2011
- Studio: Beach Road (Goderich) (Note: Ivy Jenkins' bass tracks were recorded in the United States and reworked at Beach Road.)
- Genres: Death metal; heavy metal
- Length: 36:26
- Label: eOne
- Producer: Siegfried Meier

Kittie chronology
In the Black (2009)	I've Failed You (2011)	Not So... Safe (2012)

Singles from I've Failed You
- 1. "We Are the Lamb" Released: July 20, 2011; 2. "Empires, Pt. 2" Released: August 2, 2011

I've Failed You is the sixth studio album by Canadian heavy metal band Kittie, released on August 30, 2011, through eOne Music. The album builds on the style and production of their previous album In the Black (2009) and features more personal and introspective lyrics, drawing from various events of turmoil that vocalist and guitarist Morgan Lander experienced in the two years following the aforementioned album's release. It was produced by Siegfried Meier and was primarily recorded at Beach Road Studios in Goderich, Ontario; Ivy Jenkins' bass tracks were recorded separately in the United States, as immigration issues prevented her from travelling to Canada.

I've Failed You received mixed reviews from critics; whilst some praised its production and cohesion, others criticized its generic songwriting and perceived lack of change from the band's previous albums. The album debuted at number 178 on the US Billboard 200 chart, selling 3,000 copies in its first week. Between August 2011 and May 2012, Kittie embarked on tours of the United States, Canada and Australia. Due to rising costs associated with touring and writing new music and decreasing interest in their live shows, I've Failed You would be Kittie's last album for almost 13 years, until the release of Fire (2024).

== Music, writing and recording ==
"I don't want to say it's a concept record, but pretty much every song is about the same thing. It's about things that happen in your life that you have no control over, the feeling that you've let someone down. It's weird; I didn't put too much thought into what I wanted to call the album. I guess I wanted to be as honest as possible. A lot of the lyrics that I've written in the past are very veiled, and I guess I tried to leave them as open to interpretation as possible so people could read into them whatever they wanted. I didn't want to be too personal in the past, but this time it was a bit different. I wanted to put all my cards on the table and say exactly how I felt."

— Morgan Lander on the meaning and themes of I've Failed You

A death metal and heavy metal album, Kittie has described I've Failed You as building off of the foundation set by their previous album In the Black (2009), expanding upon its style and production. It features "fast, heavy riffs", guitar solos, and screamed, growled, and clean vocals. The album's lyrics drew from various events of turmoil that vocalist and guitarist Morgan Lander experienced in the two years following the release of In the Black, the most notable being the end of a decade-long relationship and the death of David Lander, Morgan and drummer Mercedes Lander's father and Kittie's manager, in 2008. Although Morgan did not go into detail about the album's lyrics in interviews, Mercedes would describe them as "quite literal".

Following a brief hiatus after returning from touring in October 2010, Kittie began working on new material on January 1, 2011. Morgan said that the band did not begin writing material from scratch, as they had saved a few ideas beforehand; the main riff for "We Are the Lamb", for example, dates back to 2008 or 2009. The band finished writing in early March, and in mid-April 2011 they commenced the recording of I've Failed You with producer Siegfried Meier at Beach Road Studios in London, Ontario. Recording sessions lasted a total of three weeks. As with In the Black, Meier used a Studer A827 tape machine to record I've Failed You's tracks; Mercedes drums, which had been recorded digitally on In the Black, were also tracked using the tape machine. Kittie and Meier experimented with different amplifiers, microphone setups and effects to capture different guitar tones and drum sounds, whilst incorporating more double tracked vocals than they had on their previous album.

Bassist Ivy Jenkins was unable to join the other members of Kittie in Canada due to immigration issues, forcing Meier to travel to the United States with a mobile recording setup to record her bass tracks, which he recorded with no distortion so he could run them through a bass amplifier and some comps at Beach Road. In a 2011 interview with OnMilwaukee, Meier said that he and Kittie had joking compared the album's "bassless" sound during production to Metallica's ...And Justice for All. Despite this setback, the other members of Kittie kept Jenkins involved with the album's production as much as possible, sending her rough mixes as recording progressed. The band planned on having Jenkins send material over to them as well, but this was scrapped due to time constraints.

"We Are the Lamb" is about one's self-sacrifice, or one "becoming the sacrificial lamb", to allow themselves or someone they love to move on. Its lyrics were written by Mercedes, who gave Morgan "a sheet of paper that was more of a poem" and told her to extrapolate from it. "Empires, Pt. 1" and "Empires, Pt. 2" both share the same chords and structure, with the former being a solo acoustic piece written and performed by lead guitarist Tara McLeod and the latter a heavier, more aggressive song. According to Morgan, the latter song compares a relationship to an empire, and how "even the most mighty and powerful of empires [will] crumble and fall eventually. Nothing is forever."

== Release ==
=== Promotion ===
On July 20, 2011, Kittie exclusively announced the release of I've Failed You on Noisecreep and premiered "We Are the Lamb" as its lead single. Its music video, released on August 30, 2011, was produced by MGYNYC, a video production company run by Dave Brodsky and Allison Woest, whom Kittie had previously worked with on the music videos for "Cut Throat" and "Sorrow I Know" (both off of In the Black). Mercedes described the video as the band's "take on the [1970s] italian zombie movie", with her and Morgan both noting their love of horror movies. On August 2, 2011, the album's second single, "Empires Pt. 2", was premiered through Revolver magazine's website, with a music video for the song being released on August 15, 2011.

On August 23, 2011, Kittie made I've Failed You available for streaming through Exclaim!. The album was officially released in the United States through eOne Music on August 30, 2011, and in Europe through Massacre Records on September 5, 2011. Selling 3,000 copies in its first week of release, the album debuted and peaked at number 178 on the US Billboard 200 chart. The album also made appearances on three other Billboard charts, peaking at number 10 on the Top Hard Rock Albums, number 26 on the Top Independent Albums and number 46 on the Top Rock & Alternative Albums charts.

=== Touring ===
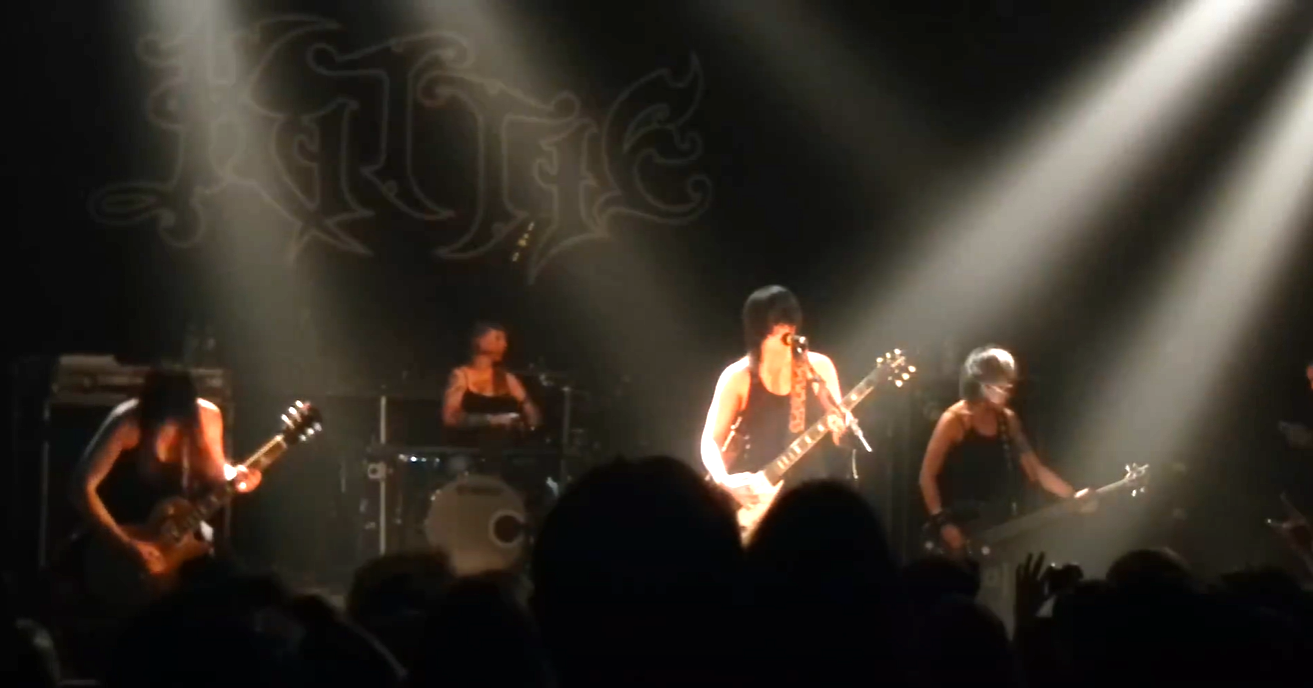
Kittie performing at the Gramercy Theatre in 2012

Kittie began touring in support of I've Failed You on August 11, 2011, when they performed at the Gathering of the Juggalos in Cave-In-Rock, Illinois. From August 12 to September 21, 2011, they toured the United States, taking Dirge Within and Diamond Plate with them as support. In mid-February 2012, the band performed two shows in Canada before embarking on their first tour of Australia since 2002, between February 25 and March 5, 2012. Prior to these performances, on February 13, 2012, Kittie announced that they would be amicably parting ways with Ivy Jenkins and that Trish Doan, who played bass on the band's fourth album Funeral for Yesterday (2007), would rejoin the band following their performance at the Soundwave Festival in Sydney on February 26, 2012. Doan previously left the band in mid-2007 after struggling with anorexia athletica-nervosa whilst on tour. McLeod said that it "was a great regret for Trish that things didn't work out for her the first time, and I think she did want that second opportunity to kind of try again. Kinda prove to herself that she could do it." Following the Australia tour, Kittie toured the United States and Canada again from April 10 to May 25, 2012, supported by The Agonist (from April 19 onwards), Blackguard and Bonded by Blood.

On September 7, 2013, Kittie performed their only show for that year at the Spread the Metal Festival at The Opera House in Toronto. It would be the band's final performance for nearly four years, as the band would enter a hiatus, citing rising costs associated with touring and writing new music and decreasing interest in their live shows. Both Morgan and Mercedes felt that Kittie had "overstayed [their] welcome" by the release of I've Failed You; the former found the band's experiences of having to sometimes play to crowds of 50 people on their final tour with Blackguard and The Agonist particularly discouraging. In a 2024 interview with Primordial Radio, Morgan also stated:

The [music] industry is hard, and [we were] slugging it out on the road, not really feeling as supported as I think we probably could have been by our former label [eOne]. I thought at the time we were putting out some of the best music that we had written up to that point with very little return, and it got tiring. It can be a really, really tough business, and expensive as well. If you're just out there in a van not making tons of money, it's like one show after another. And it is physically and can be emotionally exhausting.

Doan would remain with Kittie until her death on February 11, 2017. Though never officially breaking up, Kittie remained largely inactive until January 2022, at which point Jenkins rejoined the band. In 2024, they released their first album for almost 13 years, Fire.

== Critical reception ==
Professional ratings
Review scores
Source	Rating
About.com	4/5 stars
AllMusic	2.5/5 stars
Blabbermouth.net	7/10
Consequence of Sound	1/5 stars
Decibel	3/10
Edmonton Journal	4/5 stars
laut.de	3/5 stars
Metal.de	6/10
Metal Hammer	6/10
Now	2/5 stars

I've Failed You received mixed reviews from critics. Exclaim!'s Denise Falzon referred to the album as Kittie's "most accomplished release to date", praising its production and greater cohesion of its members' talents. No Clean Singing reviewer Andy Synn felt that the band had "finally refined their formula almost perfectly", combining the band's heavy and melancholy material "with more force and clarity than ever before." Scott Alisoglu of Blabbermouth.net similarly praised the album's production and dynamics, considering it "proof of Kittie's staying power and their ability to make music that packs a heck of a punch." However, he felt that its mellower, alternative rock-inspired tracks—namely "Never Coming Home" and "Time Never Heals"—"[flirted] with the generic". Holly Wright of Metal Hammer praised the album's "sledgehammer" riffs and guitar solos, but found that it occasionally "[sounded] a bit too much like Gwen Stefani covering At the Gates". Andreas Himmelstein and Frank Albrecht, both from Rock Hard, gave differing opinions. Himmelstein gave the album a 5 out of 10, criticizing its "total lack of ideas" and Morgan Lander's limited range, whilst Albrecht gave the album a 7.5 out of 10, finding its mix of death metal riffs and melodic vocals to be "highly entertaining".

James Christopher Monger of AllMusic found the album "nearly interchangeable with [Kittie'] previous releases", something he felt would appeal to their fans but "likely provide a whole lot of ammunition for their detractors." Expressing similar sentients, Decibel stated: "if Kittie is your thing, you are going to like this; if not, it pecking sucks [sic]." Michael Edele of laut.de said that the album was Kittie's most varied but was unsure of its general appeal, "since the die-hard fans are only partially catered for and there is probably no such thing as a casual buyer anymore." Carla Gillis of Now criticized the album's failure to "improve on or diverge from" Kittie's previous albums, as well as its lack of "memorable lyrics, riffs or melodies". Katharina of Metal.de felt the album was monotonous, uninspired, and lacking in focus. David Buchanan of Consequence of Sound criticized the album's generic imagery, music, song and album titles and considered it a "[reminder] of what happens to nu-metal bands who once submitted stellar cover songs before flickering into maddening obsolescence."

== Track listing ==
All songs written by Kittie.

No.	Title	Length
1.	"I've Failed You"	2:11
2.	"We Are the Lamb"	2:51
3.	"Whisper of Death"	4:18
4.	"What Have I Done?"	5:25
5.	"Empires, Pt. 1"	2:13
6.	"Empires, Pt. 2"	3:41
7.	"Come Undone"	2:15
8.	"Already Dead"	2:51
9.	"Never Come Home"	3:15
10.	"Ugly"	2:57
11.	"Time Never Heals"	4:30
Total length:		36:26

== Personnel ==
Adapted from CD liner notes.

Kittie
- Morgan Lander – lead vocals, guitars, piano
- Mercedes Lander – drums, percussion, backing vocals
- Tara McLeod – guitars
- Ivy Vujic Jenkins – bass

Production

- Siegfried Meier – production, mixing, engineering
- T-Roy – mastering (at Spectre Studios)
Artwork
- Morgan Lander – artwork concept
- Ama Lea – photography
- Paul Grosso – creative direction
- Sean Marlowe – art direction & design

== Charts ==
Chart performance for I've Failed You
Chart (2011)	Peak position
US Billboard 200	178
US Top Hard Rock Albums (Billboard)	10
US Top Independent Albums (Billboard)	26
US Top Rock & Alternative Albums (Billboard)	46

== Release history ==
Region	Label	Format	Date	Catalog #	Ref.
United States	eOne Music	CD; DD	August 30, 2011	EOM-CD-2153	
Germany	Massacre Records	CD; DD	September 2, 2011	MAS CD0728	
Europe	Massacre Records	CD; DD	September 5, 2011	MAS CD0728	
