= Never Again (Kittie EP) =

EP by Kittie
- Released: February 7, 2006
- Recorded: 2005
- Studio: Mole (London, Ontario)
- Genre: Heavy metal
- Length: 9:44; 13:24 (iTunes)
- Label: Rock Ridge Music
- Producer: Kittie

Kittie chronology
Until the End (2004)	Never Again (2006)	Funeral for Yesterday (2007)

Never Again is the fourth extended play by Canadian heavy metal band Kittie, released exclusively on digital storefronts on February 7, 2006, through Rock Ridge Music. Recorded at Mole Studios in London, Ontario, The EP contains four demos of "Never Again", "This Too Shall Pass", "Breathe", and "Everything That Could Have Been" (iTunes exclusive), which were later re-recorded for Kittie's fourth album Funeral for Yesterday (2007). The band supported its release with the Never Again Tour across America for two months, which allowed the band to develop their songs before recording them in the summer of 2006.

== Background and recording ==
[Never Again] is pretty much about overcoming the obstacles in life. ... these past few years have been very tumultuous for [Kittie], having people in the band leave and having problems with our old record label [Artemis]. All this has affected me and I'm not going to let it take me down. So the EP has that theme.

— Morgan Lander

Following the release of their third album Until the End (2004), Kittie parted ways with bassist Jennifer Arroyo and guitarist Lisa Marx due to financial issues and left their record label Artemis Records in March 2005. After briefly contemplating changing careers, Kittie vocalist and guitarist Morgan Lander and drummer Mercedes Lander decided to keep pursuing music and began writing songs together once or twice a week as a form of emotional release. Morgan found that the lack of record label deadlines and schedules allowed her and Mercedes to work on new material at a leisurely pace, as well as record demos and critique their songs more than they had been able to before.

At the end of April 2005, Morgan and Mercedes began recording demos at Mole Studios, a basement recording studio in their hometown of London, Ontario. They worked in the studio on weekends, recording five to six songs. Kittie self-produced the recordings themselves, with Mole Studios owner Ryner providing engineering support. The EP was written and completed before guitarist Tara McLeod and bassist Trish Doan joined Kittie, in August 2005. McLeod was brought in to record some leads and guitar solos—the latter a first in Kittie's discography—on some of its songs.

== Release and promotion ==
On November 10, 2005, Kittie announced that they had signed to Rock Ridge Music to release a new EP exclusively on digital storefronts. Morgan said that they knew several employees at Rock Ridge as ex-Artemis Records employees, "so we knew they were legit". On December 20, 2005, the band announced that they would be releasing the Never Again EP . Morgan said that Kittie's decision to forgo releasing the EP on physical media was more down to convenience and time, as they wanted their fanbase to know that the band were "still writing, still kicking ass and not on Artemis". From January 1, 2006, the band released one 45-second sample from the EP on their Myspace page every two weeks, up until the day of its release. Released on February 7, 2006, the EP debuted at number 20 on the iTunes Top Rock Downloads Chart. The EP was also streamed in its entirety on AOL Music's listening party page for a week after its release.

On February 4, 2006, Kittie played at WRIF's Pre-Super Bowl Bash at TNT's in Detroit, Michigan. From March 31 to June 17, 2006, the band embarked on its first tour in over a year, the Never Again tour, across the United States. Across its dates, the band were supported by The Agony Scene, Bloodlined Calligraphy, Burning Armada, Byzantine, Calico System, Dead to Fall, Donnybrook, Drop Dead Gorgeous, Five Bolt Main, Jacknife, Job for a Cowboy, Naos Project, On Broken Wings, Seemless, Twelve Tribes and The Warriors. The band's setlists during the tour featured a mix of material from their previous three albums and Never Again along with two songs not featured on the EP, "Summer Dies" and "Slow Motion". Morgan felt that playing the new songs live allowed them to develop, and felt they had "a different energy" after the tour compared to when they were first recorded. The band finished writing and arranging their songs after the tour, and began recording Funeral for Yesterday with producer Jack Ponti in July 2006.

== Critical reception ==
Never Again received generally positive reviews from critics. Andrew Parks of Decibel gave the EP an 8 out of 10, saying it "props 2006 as a promising year for the quartet". Westword described it as Kittie's "most commercial recording thus far, [and] a hard, heavy and hooky combination of singing and caterwauling".

== Track listing ==
All tracks are written by Morgan and Mercedes Lander.

Standard release
No.	Title	Length
1.	"Never Again"	3:32
2.	"This Too Shall Pass"	3:05
3.	"Breathe"	3:07
Total length:		9:44

iTunes exclusive bonus track
No.	Title	Length
4.	"Everything That Could Have Been"	3:40
Total length:		13:24

== Personnel ==
Kittie

- Morgan Lander – vocals, guitar
- Mercedes Lander – drums
- Tara McLeod – guitar leads and solos

Production

- Kittie – production
- Ryner – engineering
