= Trish Doan =

Korean Canadian musician (1985–2017)

- 트리시 제이미 도안
- Doan performing with Kittie in 2012
- Born: Trisha Jaimee Doan; May 9, 1985; Gwangju, South Korea
- Died: February 11, 2017 (aged 31); Surfers Paradise, Queensland, Australia
- Other name: Cher
- Citizenship: Canadian; EU
- Education: Sheridan College
- Occupations: Musician; songwriter; television producer; photographer
- Musical career
- Origin: London, Ontario, Canada
- Genres: Heavy metal; alternative metal; alternative rock
- Instruments: Guitar; bass
- Years active: 2001–2017
- Labels: HER Records; X of Infamy; MRV Music; Caroline
- Formerly of: Kittie; Her
- Website: trishdoan.com (Archived copy)

Trisha Jaimee Doan (Korean: 트리시 제이미 도안; May 9, 1985 – February 11, 2017) was a Korean-Canadian musician, photographer and television producer, best known for her tenure as the bass guitarist for the Canadian heavy metal band Kittie.

== Early life and career (1985–2003) ==
Trish Doan was born on May 9, 1985, in Gwangju, South Korea. Doan started playing guitar at the age of 13, and received her first guitar from her mother as a birthday present in 1999.

In August 2001, Doan co-founded the alternative rock band Her (stylised in all caps) with singer/rhythm guitarist Rose Cora Perry at their high school, St. Thomas Aquinas Catholic Secondary School, in London, Ontario. Doan, who was the band's lead guitarist, unsuccessfully attempted to seek out new members before Cara Moyer joined on as Her's bassist. Perry described the band's style as "angry bitch rock", and the band performed original material as well as "covers of 80s/90s rock with a modern 'rockified' twist". Her's debut (and only) album, Straight from the Loft, was released on July 4, 2003, and the band celebrated its release with a show at Call the Office in London, Ontario the same day. Doan performed her last show with the band on August 21, 2003, before leaving so she could focus on her university studies. She graduated from Sheridan College in 2006 with a diploma in "Media Arts: Film and Television Production".

== Kittie, Funeral for Yesterday and departure (2005–2011) ==
In August 2005, Doan auditioned for Kittie, who were seeking a new lead guitarist following the departure of Lisa Marx in February 2005. Doan was unsuccessful, as the band had chosen Tara McLeod by that point. However, after being told by a friend of the band that they were still looking for a bass player, she was able to successfully audition for bass instead. McLeod's and Doan's first show with Kittie took place at Call the Office on September 29, 2005. Doan recorded her only album with the band, Funeral for Yesterday (2007), in the summer of 2006.

During the recording sessions for Funeral for Yesterday, Doan developed an eating disorder, anorexia athletica-nervosa. Her health continued to decline during the album's supporting tour, The Funeral For Yesterday Tour, and she left the band in June 2007. Jeff Phillips, who had previously been the band's second guitarist during the Oracle touring cycle, filled in on bass for the band's next tour, Sweet Revenge Tour. She would be replaced by Ivana "Ivy" Jenkins in late 2007. At the time, Doan said she was on a hiatus from Kittie due to "pressing personal health matters"; the band formally announced her departure on March 4, 2008. Doan did not play bass for two years after leaving Kittie, feeling she had abandoned the other members of the band.

After leaving Kittie, Doan spent some time recovering with her parents, before moving to Toronto to work at CTV. In 2009, Doan moved to Australia, before moving back to Canada in 2011 to work at Corus Entertainment. She remained friends with Kittie after her departure, although a reunion with her was not anticipated due to "job logistics and that stuff", according to Morgan Lander.

== Return to Kittie and Kittie: Origins/Evolutions (2012–2017) ==
On February 13, 2012, it was announced that Doan had rejoined Kittie following the departure of Jenkins. After Jenkins performed her final touring leg with the band, Doan made her first appearance with the band in five years at the Soundwave Festival in Australia. Of the two albums Kittie had made in her absence, Doan stated that I've Failed You (2011) was her favourite.

In 2013, Doan moved back to Australia. Blabbermouth.net noted that during this time, Doan used her social media accounts to speak of her frustrations with depression.

In January 2015, Doan reached out to Rob McCallum, asking if he would be interested in directing a documentary about the band. McCallum and Doan had been acquainted since college, and McCallum had previously reached out to Kittie eight months prior to obtain permission to use a Kittie song in one of his other documentaries, Nintendo Quest. McCallum would direct, produce and edit the band's documentary, Kittie: Origins/Evolutions (2018). Doan filmed an interview with McCallum as part of the documentary in 2015.

== Death ==
On February 13, 2017, Kittie announced via their Facebook page that Trish Doan had died at the age of 31. Her sister, Riley Doan, clarified that Doan had actually died two days prior, on February 11. No cause of death was given. On February 16, Morgan Lander shared a longer statement regarding Doan's death on her Instagram page, stating: "I loved her like a sister and she was a part of my family, now forever changed. She with her boundless energy, 10,000 ideas and a fiery, vibrant light that could never be extinguished, even now. I love you Trish and I miss you." Jenkins also paid tribute, stating:

"Anyone who has ever met Trish Doan knows that she was one of the sweetest, kindest, most down to earth people on this planet. I loved seeing her beautiful photos of Australian sunsets and city skylines, and nerding out about bass gear and geeky tech stuff. Everyone loved Trish more than she ever realized. She has left an imprint on so many lives. Her memory and legacy will outlive her physical form for many years to come. Much love to Trish‘s family, friends and all of the world that was touched by her presence. Trish, you are loved and greatly missed."

Kittie was greatly affected by Doan's death, and in interviews Morgan Lander expressed uncertainty about new music from Kittie, feeling that it wasn't right to continue the band without her. Speaking with Consequence, Morgan stated: "[Her death has] made it really difficult to try to feel like it’s right to do more [Kittie music] when she would have wanted to be the one to be there." The band returned to touring in 2022, and has hinted at new music.

The members of Kittie have paid tribute to Doan several times since her death. In October 2017, Kittie performed an acoustic version of "Funeral for Yesterday" at the band's reunion concert celebrating the premiere of the Kittie: Origins/Evolutions documentary, which was also dedicated to her memory. On February 12, 2018, to commemorate the first anniversary of Doan's death, Kittie posted a tribute video in her memory.

== Equipment ==
Whilst a member of Her, Doan used Epiphone Les Paul Special Plus, Epiphone SG310, Fender Stratocaster and Nevada AMX Stratocaster guitars.

On Funeral for Yesterday, Doan used a Tobias Toby Pro 5 bass, which she described as "very dirty and gritty and metal sounding", to record her parts. She was later endorsed by Warwick and started using a Warwick Corvette $$ bass.

== Discography ==
=== With Her ===
- Straight from the Loft (2003)

=== With Kittie ===
- Never Again EP (2006)
- Funeral for Yesterday (2007)
