= Funeral for Yesterday =

Studio album by Kittie
- Released: February 20, 2007
- Recorded: July–August 2006
- Studio: RetroMedia Sound (Red Bank, New Jersey)
- Genres: Heavy metal; hard rock
- Length: 47:40
- Labels: X of Infamy; MRV Music
- Producer: Jack Ponti

Kittie chronology
Never Again (2006)	Funeral for Yesterday (2007)	In the Black (2009)

Singles from Funeral for Yesterday
- 1. "Funeral for Yesterday" Released: January 16, 2007; 2. "Breathe" Released: 2007

Funeral for Yesterday is the fourth studio album by Canadian heavy metal band Kittie, released on February 20, 2007. It was the only album released through the band's own record label, X of Infamy Records, and Merovingian Music (MRV). The album was produced by Jack Ponti, and was recorded at RetroMedia Sound Studios in Red Bank, New Jersey, between July and August 2006. Loosely themed around the band's demise and rebirth following a period of turmoil, the album saw Kittie transition towards a more melodic and accessible sound while retaining some of their heavier sensibilities, and was also noted for its greater focus on clean singing than on the band's previous releases. It was the first Kittie album with guitarist Tara McLeod, and only with bassist Trish Doan.

Funeral for Yesterday received generally favourable reviews from critics, who highlighted the band's newfound chemistry and growth, though its focus on clean singing drew mixed reactions. The album debuted at number 101 on the US Billboard 200 chart, selling just under 9,000 copies in its first week. Its lead single and title track, "Funeral For Yesterday", became Kittie's biggest radio hit up to that point, reaching number 40 on the Billboard Mainstream Rock Tracks chart. Kittie toured extensively in support of the album, touring North America, South America and Europe between February 2007 and November 2008.

== Background ==
In July 2004, Kittie released its third studio album, Until the End, through Artemis Records. Artemis offered limited financial support for the band's promotional tours in support of the album, leaving vocalist/guitarist Morgan Lander and drummer Mercedes Lander unable to pay bassist Jennifer Arroyo and guitarist Lisa Marx a retainer. Both members subsequently left Kittie in February 2005, and the band parted ways with Artemis the following month. Morgan and Mercedes subsequently put Kittie on hiatus whilst they contemplated changing careers, but they ultimately decided to keep pursuing music. Morgan said: "There was a lot of sadness and tears, but there was also a lot of creativity. And we ultimately decided that this is where our hearts lie and we couldn't do anything else."

The writing process for Funeral for Yesterday lasted a total of eighteen months. Work on the album began whilst Kittie was still on hiatus, when Morgan and Mercedes began writing songs together once or twice a week as a form of emotional release. Morgan felt that their songs benefitted from the fact they had no label or deadlines to contend with, which gave them more time to hone in their arrangements. At the end of April 2005, Morgan and Mercedes entered Mole Studios in their hometown of London, Ontario, to record five demo tracks. After unsuccessfully attempting to shop their demos to various record labels under the name Sweet Revenge, they decided to seek out a new guitarist and bassist for Kittie. Guitarist Tara McLeod was recruited in August 2005 by Kittie's manager, David Lander, after seeing her perform with her band Sherry in Strathroy-Caradoc, Ontario. Soon after, the band recruited Trish Doan, formerly the lead guitarist of Her, as their new bassist. Although all of the lyrics and around half of the music for Funeral for Yesterday was written before they joined the band, Morgan and Mercedes gave McLeod and Doan the freedom to write whatever they wanted for the album afterwards. McLeod wrote all of the album's guitar solos.

Kittie played their debut gig with their new line-up at Call the Office in London, Ontario, on September 29, 2005. In February 2006, the band released a digital-only EP, Never Again, through Rock Ridge Music as a teaser release for their next album; it featured demos of the songs "Never Again", "This Too Shall Pass", "Breathe" and "Everything That Could Have Been". Kittie embarked on a three-month tour of North America in support of the EP, which allowed the band to play their new songs to audiences and "work out [their] kinks". (Note: Kittie's setlists during the Never Again Tour consisted of material from their previous three albums, three songs from the EP and two new songs, "Summer Dies" and "Slow Motion".) Speaking with Brave Words & Bloody Knuckles in 2007, Morgan said: "The more you play a song the more it becomes its own sort of beast. It breathes and changes with every passing show, and you do things a little differently every time." By the end of the tour, she felt that the EP's songs had "a different energy" compared to when they were first recorded.

By late June 2006, Kittie had formed their own record label, Kiss of Infamy Records. The band formed the label in partnership with producer Jack Ponti, who helped secure its distribution through EMI. Morgan said that Ponti became interested in working with Kittie after a radio promoter and mutual friend of the band gave him a copy of the Never Again EP. Mercedes said the band's decision to release Funeral for Yesterday on their own label felt like the "next logical step" after having to pay for tours themselves and managing their own merchandise and clothing line, Poisoned Black. In December 2006, Kittie were forced to change their label's name to "X of Infamy" after the band received a cease-and-desist order from Gene Simmons, owner of the "Kiss" trademark.

== Recording and production ==
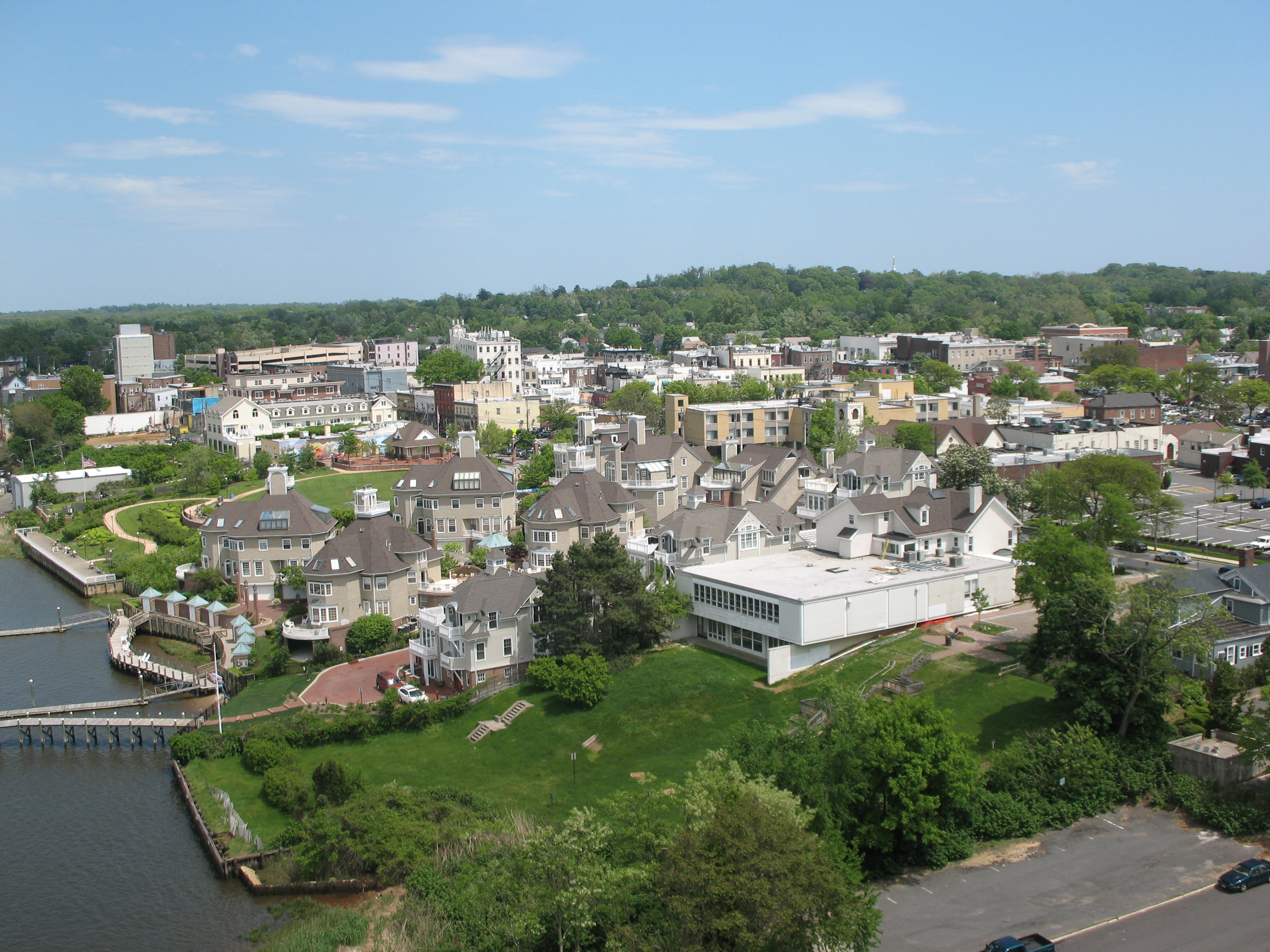
Funeral for Yesterday was recorded in Red Bank, New Jersey, seen here in 2007.

Funeral for Yesterday was recorded at RetroMedia Sound Studios in Red Bank, New Jersey; its six-week recording span was the longest of any Kittie album. It was the first album Ponti had produced since Doro's Machine II Machine (1995). Recording commenced on July 15, 2006, and wrapped up in late August 2006; the band would record from 12pm to 6pm or 8pm per day. Morgan said that Kittie found working with Ponti "a bit rusty in the beginning"—it would take him and the band a week to record the album's first song—though "In the end, [everyone's] visions were the same—we wanted to make a great album." Mercedes said that Kittie "didn't have a lot of say" in the way the album was recorded, which she would later attribute to a "power struggle" between the band and Ponti that they ultimately lost "because he had the stronger personality". Doan had a poor working relationship with Ponti, and he stopped speaking to her directly following an argument at the studio.

Morgan said that Ponti encouraged Kittie to push the boundaries of their sound, and also that he had a "definite idea of how he [wanted] things to sound". During the recording of Funeral for Yesterday, the band experimented with different recording techniques, vintage instruments, microphone placements, and vocal harmonies, the latter which Morgan called Ponti a "master at arranging". The band worked on completing a song individually before moving on to another; Ponti spend time arranging microphones for each of them. Whilst its guitars, bass and drums were tracked onto two-inch analogue tape, the album's vocals were recorded using Pro Tools, which was also used for the incorporation and arrangement of its vocal harmonies. McLeod said that Ponti rejected most of her "planned" guitar parts in favour of her jamming "off the cuff" to its tracks; Morgan said that he would "point at [McLeod] to play a lick. Just making it up as she went along." Doan said that 90% of her basslines were changed and had to relearn them as recording progressed. Mercedes' drums were recorded in no more than three takes per song.

Kittie said that Funeral for Yesterday was recorded with a "less is more" mentality; Morgan explained that this was "not 'less is more' in terms of the end product and the richness of the music, [but] 'less is more' like you do less guitar tracks to make it sound fuller". The band used two guitar tracks on each song—one for Morgan and the other for McLeod's leads. Morgan used a custom Hamer Victor guitar, whilst McLeod used a Gibson Les Paul; both played through Krank Krankenstein amplifiers. Four microphones were split between the front and the back of their cabinets to allow "the high-end [to mix] with the low-end", according to Mercedes. Morgan compared the guitar sound to that of Van Halen's self-titled debut album (1978): "That album had just one guitar track mixed hard to one side, and it sounds huge. We adopted that style--adding just a little textural pepper here and there to make [it] sound well rounded." Doan played a Tobias Toby Pro 5 bass. Mercedes' drum kit used a microphone setup similar to John Bonham's during the recording of Led Zeppelin's "When the Levee Breaks" (1971); four room mics were placed in front of, behind, and to the sides of her, alongside numerous other microphones surrounding her toms and kick drum.

After recording was completed, Funeral for Yesterday was mixed at The Document Room in Malibu, California by Kevin Shirley between September 5 and September 14, 2006. Morgan said that Kittie supplied Shirley with "as much work as possible", giving him unused counterpoints, overdubs and "little nuances" from recording for him to work with, and that the final album was "99% of what we wanted to have on there, [with] a couple of things he fiddled around with." The album was then sent to Sterling Sound to be mastered by Leon Zervos. On October 11, 2006, Mercedes announced that the album had been completed. The album's recording sessions were partially documented in a companion DVD released with physical editions of the album.

== Composition and lyrics ==
Musically, Funeral for Yesterday sees Kittie mix their heavy musical side with more melodic elements, incorporating guitar solos and vocal harmonies. The album has also been noted for its softer, more accessible production and sound. Morgan stated that Kittie wanted to "make an album where you could bang your head and sing along at the same time", whilst Doan believed that the band had "worked more in a way that ... was to get songs on the radio." Morgan and McLeod cited classic rock acts, including Van Halen, Thin Lizzy, Led Zeppelin and AC/DC, as influences on the album's song structures and guitar solos. The album's songs are played in the tuning of drop C. The album has also been noted for focusing more on Morgan's clean singing in contrast on Kittie's previous releases, alongside screamed and growled vocals. Mercedes said that it was deliberately sequenced with songs that mainly featured clean vocals placed in its first half, and "more aggressive vocal stuff" in its second.

Lyrically, Morgan said that Funeral for Yesterday is loosely themed around "the demise of the former [incarnation of Kittie], [and] the resurrection of something new." In a 2007 interview with Metal Edge, she stated that Kittie "wanted to make an impression and show people what we could do now ... [and] change people's opinions of us", and that the album was supposed to represent "the death of the past and cleaning the slate." Funeral for Yesterday's opening title track, which deals with themes of morality and rebirth, was described by IGN as "a tale of renewal for Morgan ... and for [Kittie] as a whole". Morgan felt that the song was the most emblematic of Kittie's direction on the album. According to Morgan, "Everything That Could Have Been" covers "reflection of the past, and wishing to change it solely to see how differently the outcome would have been", whilst "Slow Motion" is about "seeing something or someone that you love die slowly, and [knowing that] there is nothing that can be done". In a 2007 interview with Revolver, Morgan said that "Never Again" is about Kittie "taking a stand never to be treated a certain way, never to be walked on again or allow ourselves to be vulnerable. We've dealt with these things before and made our mistakes, and now we're fucking warriors." "Flower of Flesh and Blood" is "about the concept of having a human guinea pig and seeing beauty in death and things that are ugly"; Morgan said the song deviated from the album's general concept.

== Release and promotion ==
On October 25, 2006, Kittie unveiled Funeral for Yesterday's title and cover artwork. In the coming months, various tracks from the album were uploaded to the band's MySpace page. On November 14, 2006, a radio-ready version of "Funeral for Yesterday", was posted online; a music video for the song was released three days later. A second music video, directed by Vincent Giordano, was filmed in Long Island, New York, on February 5, 2007. The video was made available to stream online on March 6, 2007, and debuted on MTV's Headbangers Ball on March 17.

Funeral for Yesterday was released in the United States by X of Infamy and Merovingian Music (MRV) on February 20, 2007. It was not released in Europe. The album sold just under 9,000 copies during its first week of release, debuting at number 101 on the US Billboard 200 chart. The album also reached number seven on Billboard's Top Independent Albums chart. By April 4, 2007, it had sold 20,000 copies in the United States. On January 16, 2007, "Funeral For Yesterday" was released as the album's lead single; it became Kittie's biggest radio hit up to that point, peaking at number 40 on Billboard's Mainstream Rock Tracks chart on April 14, 2007. "Breathe" was also released as a single from the album, but failed to chart.

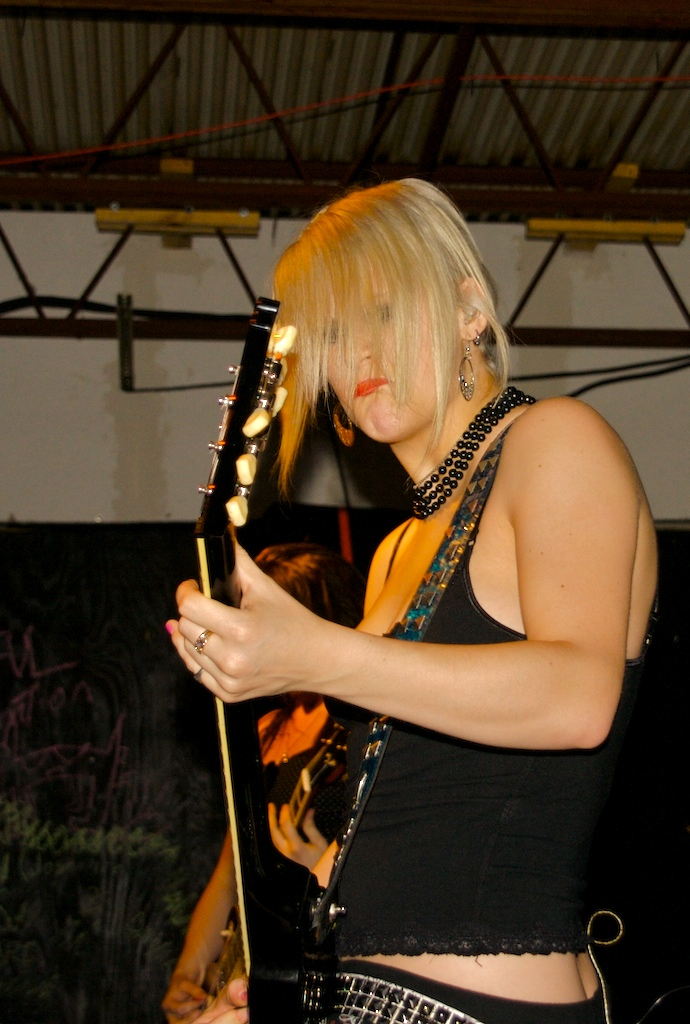
Morgan Lander performing with Kittie in August 2007

From February 9 to May 25, 2007, Kittie embarked on their headlining Funeral for Yesterday Tour of the United States, supported by Walls of Jericho, 36 Crazyfists, Dead to Fall and In This Moment. The band also performed several acoustic shows at various FYE stores across the United States between April 17 and May 5, 2007. Kittie intended on touring the United Kingdom supporting Cradle of Filth in April 2007, but pulled out as their record label would not give them any touring support. At the end of the tour, Trish Doan left Kittie due to her worsening anorexia athletica-nervosa, which she developed during the production of Funeral for Yesterday. Prior to her departure, the other members of Kittie had expressed concern with Doan's behavior and encouraged her to leave for her health; Doan said she was "still in such denial and so caught up in myself that I just didn't care or I didn't really think about it". She ultimately left the band sometime after fainting and falling off the stage at one of the band's shows. Her departure was officially announced on March 4, 2008. Following Doan's departure, Kittie bought themselves out of their contract with Ponti.

From July 6 to September 16, 2007, Kittie embarked on another headlining tour of the United States, the Sweet Revenge Tour, with It Dies Today, Silent Civilian, Bring Me the Horizon and Blessed by a Broken Heart. Former touring guitarist Jeff Phillips filled in on bass for the duration of the tour. At one of the Sweet Revenge tour dates in Baltimore, Maryland on August 19, 2007, Kittie ended their set early after Morgan was groped by a member of the audience, who was then attacked by the crowd. Kittie recruited Ivana "Ivy" Jenkins as their new permanent bassist after the tour. Jenkins was supposed to have auditioned for the band back in 2005, but her car was totalled and could not travel from Toronto to meet them. In November 2007, Kittie played their first ever shows in South America, performing in Santiago and São Paulo. The band continued to tour until November 2008, with dates in North America and Europe; the latter tour was their first of the region in over six years.

== Critical reception ==
Professional ratings
Review scores
Source	Rating
About.com	3/5 stars
AllMusic	3.5/5 stars
Blabbermouth.net	4/10
Brave Words & Bloody Knuckles	8.5/10
Collector's Guide to Heavy Metal	6/10
IGN	7.7/10
Now	1/5 stars

Funeral for Yesterday received generally favourable reviews from critics. AllMusic reviewer James Christopher Monger said that Kittie's new direction on the album "suits them in a way that indicates actual growth". Aaron Burgess of the Phoenix New-Times felt that the band had succeeded in transitioning towards a pop-oriented sound, despite calling such a move "risky". IGN's Ed Thompson called the album Kittie's "most comprehensive album" up to that point, highlighting the band's newfound musical chemistry. Mark Fisher of the Times West Virginian called the album "top notch", stating that its expansion on melody "[adds] yet another dimension to [Kittie's] already solid sound". Less favourably, Keith Bergman of Blabbermouth.net said that the album was mostly "plodding, rudimentary and dishwater-dull", but acknowledged that the band were "slowly getting competent", citing "The Change" and the beginning of "Around Your Heart" as displays of their "frightening potential". Chart Attack's Shehzaad Jiwani viewed the album as "more or less" a rehash of the band's early sound found on Spit (1999) and felt it "does nothing to convince listeners that Kittie are a band to be taken seriously."

Funeral for Yesterday's focus on Morgan's vocals proved polarizing with critics, and was expected to draw similar responses from Kittie's fanbase. Evan Davies of Now panned the album for showcasing Morgan's "ultra-annoying ability to sing almost exclusively through her nose as she spouts trite, clichéd lyrics about pain and suffering." Jiwani and Bergman both criticized Morgan's limited range, with the latter blaming Jack Ponti's overuse of "robot choir" vocals on all of the album's choruses for making it both formulaic and forgettable. Conversely, Paul Gargano of LiveDaily saw its melodic vocals as indicative of Kittie's developing songwriting and said that they made its songs "immensely more listenable". Carl Begai of Brave Words & Bloody Knuckles felt that although Morgan's vocals largely dominated the album's production, they did not overshadow its "brilliant riffs, crushing Machine Head-ish rhythms and solos". Monger expressed similar sentiments, stating that Morgan's vocals did not take away from the album's heaviness and aggression.

Morgan and Mercedes have reflected unfavourably on Funeral for Yesterday in the years following its release, praising its songwriting but criticizing its production. In a 2009 interview, Mercedes singled out its "over-produced" vocals for criticism, claiming that they made Morgan "sound like a fucking Chipmunk ... which was ridiculous". However, when asked by The Rockpit in 2010 if she regretted releasing the album, Mercedes stated: "I wouldn't say regret, we would have done it differently." Morgan similarly commented that although she considered Funeral For Yesterday's songwriting some of Kittie's best work, its recording and production "didn't end up sounding the way I had hoped". She described the band's next album, In the Black (2009), as an "antithesis" to the album and their attempt to "undo all the things [it] did". In a 2024 Reddit AMA, Morgan said that a vinyl reissue of Funeral For Yesterday is unlikely as Kittie does not own the rights to the album, though expressed interest in having it remixed and remastered.

== Track listing ==
All songs written by Morgan Lander and Mercedes Lander.

No.	Title	Length
1.	"Funeral for Yesterday"	3:24
2.	"Breathe"	3:11
3.	"Everything That Could Have Been"	4:43
4.	"Slow Motion"	3:54
5.	"Will to Live"	3:14
6.	"Never Again"	3:49
7.	"Sweet Destruction Interlude"	2:25
8.	"Summer Dies"	3:53
9.	"Flower of Flesh and Blood"	2:12
10.	"Around Your Heart"	2:56
11.	"This Too Shall Pass"	3:07
12.	"Last Goodbye"	2:37
13.	"Witch Hunt"	3:58
14.	"The Change"	3:57
Total length:		47:40

== Personnel ==
Personnel per liner notes.

Kittie
- Morgan Lander – lead vocals, guitar
- Mercedes Lander – drums, piano, backing vocals
- Tara McLeod – guitar
- Trish Doan – bass

Production

- Jack Ponti – production, engineering, arrangements
- Kevin Shirley – mixing (at The Document Room)
- Leon Zervos – mastering (at Sterling Sound)
- John Noll – engineering
- Adam Vaccarelli – associate producer, engineering
- Rick Moulton – associate producer
- Torie Rovere – production assistant
Artwork
- Geoff Mack – artwork
- Morgan Lander – art direction
- Mercedes Lander – art direction
- Jack Ponti – art direction
- Lindsay Campbell – photography
- Kyle Kraszewski – formatting, layout design
- Greg Edgerton – formatting, layout design

Funeral for Yesterday - Bonus DVD

- Greg Edgerton – director, producer, editing
- Jack Ponti – executive producer
- Akbar Shamji – executive producer
- Kyle Kraszewski – associate producer
- Adam Worth – associate producer, director of photography
- Dale May – photographer
- Neva Lindner – stylist
- Leyda Quintero – makeup
- Kittie – additional footage
- Silvia Cincotta – hairstylist
- Jamie Roberts – interviewer

== Charts ==
Chart performance for Funeral for Yesterday
Chart (2007)	Peak position
US Billboard 200	101
US Top Independent Albums (Billboard)	7
