= Muscle dysmorphia =

Subtype of the body dysmorphic disorder

- Other names: bigorexia, megarexia, reverse anorexia
- Specialty: Psychiatry, clinical psychology
- Symptoms: Fear of perceived body image flaws, misconceptions about one's own physical appearance, excessive efforts to increase muscularity, dietary restriction
- Complications: Suicide attempts, self-harm
- Risk factors: Low self-esteem, traumatic events, media exposure
- Treatment: Cognitive behavioral therapy (CBT)
- Medication: SSRIs

Muscle dysmorphia is a subtype of the obsessive mental disorder body dysmorphic disorder, but is often also grouped with eating disorders. In muscle dysmorphia, which is sometimes called "bigorexia", "megarexia", or "reverse anorexia", the delusional or exaggerated belief is that one's own body is too small, too skinny, insufficiently muscular, or insufficiently lean, although in most cases, the individual's build is normal or even exceptionally large and muscular already.

Muscle dysmorphia affects mostly men, particularly those involved in sports where body size or weight are competitive factors, becoming rationales to gain muscle or become leaner. The quest to seemingly fix one's body consumes inordinate time, attention, and resources, as on exercise routines, dietary regimens, and nutritional supplementation, while use of anabolic steroids is also common. Other body-dysmorphic preoccupations that are not muscle-dysmorphic are usually present as well.

Although likened to anorexia nervosa, muscle dysmorphia is especially difficult to recognize, since awareness of it is scarce and persons experiencing muscle dysmorphia typically remain healthy looking. The distress and distraction of muscle dysmorphia may provoke absences from school, work, and social settings. Compared to other body dysmorphic disorders, rates of suicide attempts are especially high with muscle dysmorphia. Researchers believe that muscle dysmorphia's incidence is rising, partly due to the recent cultural emphasis on muscular male bodies.

== Signs and symptoms ==
Although body dissatisfaction has been found in boys as young as age six, muscle dysmorphia's onset is estimated at usually between ages 18 and 20. According to DSM-5, muscle dysmorphia is indicated by the diagnostic criteria for body dysmorphic disorder via "the idea that his or her body is too small or insufficiently muscular", and this specifier holds even if the individual is preoccupied with other body areas, too, as is often the case.

Further clinical features identified include excessive conduct of efforts to increase muscularity, activities such as dietary restriction, overtraining, and injection of growth-enhancing drugs. Persons experiencing muscle dysmorphia generally spend over three hours daily pondering increased muscularity, and may feel unable to limit weightlifting. As in anorexia nervosa, the reverse quest in muscle dysmorphia can be insatiable. Those suffering from the disorder closely monitor their body and may wear multiple clothing layers to make it appear larger.

Muscle dysmorphia involves severe distress at having one's body viewed by others. Occupational and social functioning are impaired, and dietary regimes may interfere with these. Patients often avoid activities, people, and places that threaten to reveal their perceived deficiency of size or muscularity. Roughly half of patients have poor or no insight that these perceptions are unrealistic. Patient histories reveal elevated rates of diagnoses of other mental disorders, including eating disorders, mood disorders, anxiety disorders, and substance use disorder, as well as elevated rates of suicide attempts.

== Risk factors ==
Although muscle dysmorphia's development is unclear, several risk factors have been identified.

=== Trauma and bullying ===
Versus the general population, persons manifesting muscle dysmorphia are more likely to have experienced or observed traumatic events like sexual assault or domestic violence, or to have sustained adolescent bullying and ridicule for actual or perceived deficiencies such as smallness, weakness, poor athleticism, or intellectual inferiority. Increased body mass may seem to reduce the threat of further mistreatment.

=== Sociopsychological traits ===
Low self-esteem is associated with higher levels of body dissatisfaction and of muscle dysmorphia. Vulnerable narcissism has also been linked to heightened muscle dysmorphia risk. Increased body size or muscularity may seem to enhance the masculine identity.

=== Media exposure ===
As Western media emphasize physical attractiveness, some marketing campaigns now exploit male body-image insecurities. Since the 1980s, the number of fitness magazines and of partially undressed, muscular men in advertisements have increased. Such media provoke bodily comparisons and pressure individuals to conform, yet increase the gap between men's perceptions of their own muscularity versus their desired muscularity. In college-aged men, a strong predictor of a muscularity quest is internalization of the idealized male bodies depicted in media.

=== Athletic participation ===
Athletes tend to share some psychological factors that may predispose to muscle dysmorphia, factors including high levels of competitiveness, need for control, and perfectionism, and athletes tend to be more critical of their own bodies and body weight. Athletes who also fail to meet their sports performance goals may escalate efforts to modify their builds, efforts that overlap those of muscle dysmorphia. Involvement in sports where size, strength, or weight, whether higher or lower, imply competitive advantage associates with muscle dysmorphia. Athletic ideals reinforce the social ideal of muscularity. Conversely, those already disposed to muscle dysmorphia may be more likely to participate in such sports.

=== Sexual orientation ===
It has been observed that men who have sex with men (MSM) have a unique relationship with the development of muscle dysmorphia symptoms. MSM are at increased risk for experiencing internalized heterosexism, which can lead to dissatisfaction with one's body and the internalizing of standards for attractiveness. Men who conform to conventional ideals of masculinity often report increased stress from not meeting the imposed standard of a masculine and muscular body. In a sample of 2,733 MSM who reported body dissatisfaction, only one in every 10 reported feeling no dissatisfaction with their muscularity. Dissatisfaction with muscularity had a stronger relationship with quality of life impairment when compared to dissatisfaction with body fat, height, and penis size.

Those who identify as a sexual minority are at increased risk for victimization due to their identity. Having been a victim of homophobic bullying is associated with more symptoms of muscle dysmorphia. A possible cause for this relationship can be the increased feelings of paranoid ideation that a MSM individual can experience following homophobic bullying.

== Treatment ==
Treatment of muscle dysmorphia can be stymied by a patient's unawareness that the preoccupation is disordered or by avoidance of treatment. Scientific research on treatment of muscle dysmorphia is limited, the evidence largely in case reports and anecdotes, and no specific protocols have been validated. Still, evidence supports the efficacy of family-based therapy, cognitive behavioural therapy, and pharmacotherapy with selective serotonin reuptake inhibitors. Also limited is research on prognosis of the untreated.

== Prevalence ==
Prevalence estimates for muscle dysmorphia have greatly varied, ranging from 1% to 54% of men in the studied samples. Samples of gym members, weightlifters, and bodybuilders show higher prevalence than do samples from the general population. Rates even higher have been found among users of anabolic steroids. The disorder is rare in women but does occur, and has been noted especially in female bodybuilders who have experienced sexual assault.

Muscle dysmorphia has been identified in China, South Africa, and Latin America. Nonwestern populations less exposed to western media show lower rates of muscle dysmorphia.

== History ==
Muscle dysmorphia was first conceptualized by healthcare professionals in the late 1990s. In 2016, 50% of peer-reviewed articles on it had been published in the prior five years.

Although muscle dysmorphia was initially viewed as anorexia nervosa's inverse—questing to be large and muscular instead of small and thin—later researchers fit the subjective experience to body dysmorphic disorder.

The American Psychiatric Association recognized muscle dysmorphia with the fifth edition of the Diagnostic and Statistical Manual of Mental Disorders, which classifies it under body dysmorphic disorder. In the ICD-11, muscle dysmorphia is classified as an index term and a subtype of body dysmorphic disorders.

== Reclassifications ==
Muscle dysmorphia's classification has been widely debated, and alternative DSM classifications have been proposed.

- Eating disorder: Many of muscle dysmorphia's traits overlap with those of eating disorders, including focus on body weight, shape, and modification, whereas body dysmorphic disorder otherwise usually lacks such dietary and exercise components. Also, persons experiencing muscle dysmorphia tend to score high on the Eating Attitudes Test and Eating Disorder Inventory, while muscle dysmorphia and anorexia nervosa share diagnostic crossover. Muscle dysmorphia and disordered eating correlate more to each other than either correlates to body dysmorphic disorder. Treatment for eating disorders may also be effective for muscle dysmorphia.
- Behavioral addiction: Some researchers seek muscle dysmorphia's reclassification as a behavioral addiction. Muscle dysmorphia's effort to maintain body image is enacted through activities such as exercise, diet, and related shopping, which may cause conflicts with others. Moreover, compulsive muscle building and dietary restriction can escalate these conflicts. Further, abstinence from these activities can provoke withdrawal symptoms, returning the individual to compulsive behavior.

== See also ==
- Anorexia athletica
- Exercise addiction
- Exercise bulimia
