= Exercise addiction =

Compulsive engagement of excessive physical exercise despite negative consequences

Addiction and dependence glossary
- addiction – a neuropsychological disorder characterized by a persistent and intense urge to use a drug or engage in a behavior that produces natural reward; addictive drug – psychoactive substances that with repeated use are associated with significantly higher rates of substance use disorders, due in large part to the drug's effect on brain reward systems; dependence – an adaptive state associated with a withdrawal syndrome upon cessation of repeated exposure to a stimulus (e.g., drug intake); drug sensitization or reverse tolerance – the escalating effect of a drug resulting from repeated administration at a given dose; drug withdrawal – symptoms that occur upon cessation of repeated drug use; physical dependence – dependence that involves persistent physical–somatic withdrawal symptoms (e.g., delirium tremens and nausea); psychological dependence – dependence that is characterized by emotional-motivational withdrawal symptoms (e.g., anhedonia and anxiety) that affect cognitive functioning.; reinforcing stimuli – stimuli that increase the probability of repeating behaviors paired with them; rewarding stimuli – stimuli that the brain interprets as intrinsically positive and desirable or as something to approach; sensitization – an amplified response to a stimulus resulting from repeated exposure to it; substance use disorder – a condition in which the use of substances leads to clinically and functionally significant impairment or distress; drug tolerance – the diminishing effect of a drug resulting from repeated administration at a given dose

Exercise addiction is a state characterized by a compulsive engagement in any form of physical exercise, despite negative consequences. While regular exercise is generally a healthy activity, exercise addiction generally involves performing excessive amounts of exercise to the detriment of physical health, spending too much time exercising to the detriment of personal and professional life, and exercising regardless of physical injury. It may also involve a state of dependence upon regular exercise which involves the occurrence of severe withdrawal symptoms when the individual is unable to exercise. Differentiating between addictive and healthy exercise behaviors is difficult but there are key factors in determining which category a person may fall into. Exercise addiction shows a high comorbidity with eating disorders.

Exercise addiction is not listed as a disorder in the DSM-5. This type of addiction can be classified under a behavioral addiction in which a person's behavior becomes obsessive, compulsive, and/or causes dysfunction in a person's life.

== Classification ==
A concrete classification of exercise addiction has proven to be difficult due to the lack of a specific and widely accepted diagnostic model. Most interpretations of addiction have traditionally been limited to drugs and alcohol, which makes it even more difficult to identify addictive tendencies in exercise. While excessive exercise is the overarching theme with exercise addiction, the term also includes a variety of symptoms like withdrawal, "exercise buzz", and impaired physical function. Excessive exercise has been classified in different ways; sometimes as an addiction and sometimes as a more general compulsive behavior. Psychiatric case studies have shown that exaggerated exercise could lead to negligence of work and family life. With an addiction, individuals become "hooked" to the feeling of euphoria and pleasure that exercise provides. This pleasure keeps the individual from stopping and leads to excessive exercise. With a compulsion people often do not necessarily enjoy repeating certain tasks, as they may feel like performing it will fulfill a duty that is required of them. There are many opinions on whether concrete diagnostic criteria should be created for this type of addiction. Some say preoccupation with exercise that causes significant impairment in a person's life, not due to another disorder, may be enough criteria to label this disorder. Others say there is not enough information about exercise addiction to develop diagnostic criteria. As of 2007, the term "excessive exercise" continues to be used while the "exercise addiction" model continues to be debated.

Three main types of disorders are associated with excessive exercise:

1. Anorexia athletica (obligatory exercise) - When an individual feels compelled to exercise beyond the point of benefitting one's body. Individuals will participate in athletic activities regardless of pain, injury, illness, etc., and will try to arrange their lives in order to maximize workout time.
2. Exercise bulimia - When an individual has binge eating sessions that are followed by periods of high-intensity exercise.
3. Muscle dysmorphia - When an individual is fixated on their body not being muscular enough or being to skinny or lean. These individuals will often create highly regimented routines and restrict their diet in order to "fix" their self-perceived lack of muscle.

== Signs and symptoms ==
Five indicators of exercise addiction are:

1. An increase in exercise that may be labeled as detrimental, or becomes harmful.
2. A desire to experience euphoria; exercise may be increased as tolerance of the euphoric state increases.
3. Not participating in physical activity will cause dysfunction in one's daily life.
4. Severe withdrawal symptoms following exercise deprivation including anxiety, restlessness, depression, guilt, tension, discomfort, loss of appetite, sleeplessness, and headaches.
5. Exercising through trauma and despite physical injuries.

Key differences between healthy and addictive levels of exercise include the presence of withdrawal symptoms when exercise is stopped as well as the addictive properties exercise may have leading to a dependence on exercise.

Those who succumb to exercise addiction may experience overtraining, which is best defined as a "condition of poor adaptation to a chronic period of excessive stress caused by a physical exertion, resulting in the development of the syndrome, compromising the health and sports performance".

Overtraining includes one or more of the following:

- Persistent muscle soreness
- Elevated resting heart rate
- Increased susceptibility to infections
- Increased incidence of injuries
- Insomnia
- Decreased appetite
- Weight loss
- Impaired performance
- Decreased motor coordination and force production

Exercise addiction may also lead to mood disturbances. Those who undergo rigorous training without adequate rest are more likely to experience depression, anger, fatigue and confusion.

Excessive exercise can lead to premature osteoporosis. Overtraining can lead to reductions in gonadal steroids and elevated levels of stress hormones such as cortisol. Reductions in gonadal steroids decrease osteoblast activity, while increased cortisol leads to increased osteoclast activity and reduced intestinal absorption of calcium. Reductions in calcium absorption without concurrent increases in calcium intake will increase parathyroid hormone secretion to maintain calcium homeostasis via promotion of osteoclastic activity.

== Mechanisms ==
As of 2016, the mechanisms involved in the development of an exercise addiction, associated with the transition from healthy committed exercise to compulsive exercise, are unknown.

Exercise addiction, however, has long been known to begin with a desire for physical fitness. An eating disorder, such as anorexia nervosa or bulimia supports an unhealthy obsession with exercise, as such. A body image disorder can likely cause exercise addiction as well. One of the prevailing mechanisms for this addiction lies within these activities that expose individuals to the mood-altering effects of this behavior, and can many times deposit dopamine directly into the blood flow.

The chemical functioning of the brain may also play an integral role in potential mood changes based on exercise. Griffiths reported a lengthy case study of exercise addiction and laid out three viable prospects of biological mechanisms that pair an improved satisfactory mood with exercise:

- The Thermogenic Hypothesis: Exercise is said to increase body temperature, thereby diminishing somatic anxiety. This decrease in anxiety can be related to a higher temperature in certain regions of the brain.
- The Catecholamine Hypothesis: Exercise releases catecholamines, a group of substances in bloodstream (usually in response to emotional/physical stress) which regulate our mood, attention, and movement as well as endocrine and cardiovascular responses that are linked to stress levels in our body.
- The Endorphin Hypothesis: Exercise releases endorphins, which are opiates that occur naturally in the body, however, sometimes an enjoyable experience as such, has indirect consequences resulting in irregularity where the increased endorphin production over time entices the individual to continue performing regular intense aerobic exercise. Such high levels of endorphin production means the brain will have to down-regulate endorphin production, essentially "manipulating" the individual to believe that the exercise must be performed daily in order to maintain the new natural balance in the brain.

Griffiths' findings suggest that once exercise occurs at high frequencies, it must be maintained in a similar manner and is very difficult to break the pattern. Similarly, it can be argued that with reduced voluptuary pleasure from other activities, it is likely that a person may have to maintain such levels of intense exercise in order to optimize and activate certain reward systems within the mesolimbic dopamine system in the brain. If they are not activated, the person will continue feeling the original level of distress prior to exercise.

== Assessment ==
Different assessment tools can be used to determine if an individual is addicted to exercise. Most tools used to determine risk for exercise addiction are modified tools that have been used for assessing other behavioral addictions. Tools for determining eating disorders can also show a high risk for exercise addiction.

The Obligatory Exercise Questionnaire was created by Thompson and Pasman in 1991, consisting of 20 questions on exercise habits and attitudes toward exercise and body image. Patients respond to statements on a scale of 1 (never) to 4 (always). This questionnaire aided in the development of another assessment tool, the Exercise Addiction Inventory.

The Exercise Addiction Inventory was developed by Terry et al in 2004. This inventory was developed as a self-report to examine an individual's beliefs toward exercise. The inventory is made up of six statements in relation to the perception of exercise, concerning: the importance of exercise to the individual, relationship conflicts due to exercise, how mood changes with exercise, the amount of time spent exercising, the outcome of missing a workout, and the effects of decreasing physical activity. Individuals are asked to rate each statement from 1 (strongly disagree) to 5 (strongly agree). If an individual scores above 24 they are said to be at-risk for exercise addiction.

== When exercise addiction and personality disorders coexist ==
Common co-occurring disorders are prominent in that they can mask exercise addiction and/or complicate treatments for many patients. Eating disorders and Impulse Control Disorder, like many other anxiety disorders, can oftentimes be disguised as exercise addiction and are maintained primarily by negative reinforcement through anxiety reduction. Addictive behavior, more commonly described as impulsivity, consists of jerky, rapid and unplanned responses to external or internal stimuli. Impulsive behavior can result in many negative consequences and is intuitively driven by a desired end-goal of a positive reward, similar to the one received after a good workout.

Eating disorders are the most common co-occurring disorder with exercise addiction, with 39–48% of people suffering from both. For some, the primary motivation for exercise is extreme weight, which has been given a special name: anorexia athletica. When exercise addiction and eating disorders co-occur for many trying to bulk up, only one problem will be treated which raises an alarming concern. Often the eating disorder, which is also the more-known and apparent disorder, is the primary focus of treatment and the secondary exercise addiction is disguised and often tossed aside. Despite a healthier, now improved relationship to food and one's appetite, the individual will still not gain any additional weight, and thus leads to a repetitive cycle that is managed through a more potent exercise regimen.

== Treatment ==
Behavioral addiction and substance abuse disorders are treated similarly; treatment options include exposure and response prevention. No medications have been approved for the treatment of behavioral addictions. Studies have shown promise in the use of glutamatergic altering drugs to treat addictions other than exercise. Exercise addictions comorbid in patients with an eating disorder may be treated through psychotherapy involving education, behavioral interventions, and a strengthened family support structure. In treating the eating disorder, obsessions and compulsions produced by obscured body image ideals will also be treated, this includes exercise addiction.

== Epidemiology ==
Most research has focused on adult population or on college students, but little is known about epidemiology of behavioral addictions in adolescence. A study conducted by Villella et al looked at a group of students and the prevalence of various addictions. His results showed exercise addiction was the second most prevalent, after compulsive buying. High risk groups that appear to be addicted to exercise include athletes in sports encouraging thinness or appearance standards, young and middle-age women, and young men.

== Prognosis ==
Individuals with exercise addiction may put exercise above family and friends, work, injuries, and other social activities. If not identified and treated, an exercise addiction may lead to a significant decline in one's health.

== Comorbidity ==
An addiction, by definition, includes repeated compulsive behaviors that negatively affect daily living. There are two ways to classify addictive behaviors: substance addiction and process addiction. An exercise addiction is a type of process addiction, in which an individual's mood toward a certain event becomes dependent on addictive behaviors. Many educational, occupational, and social activities are stopped due to excessive exercising. Depression may develop if exercise is neglected or may result from reoccurring physical injuries that limit exercise. Exercise addiction is often related to obsessive-compulsive disorder as exercise addicts may have obsessions or compulsions toward physical activity. Exercise addiction is also commonly associated with eating disorders as a secondary symptom of bulimia or anorexia nervosa. Approximately 39-48% of people that have an eating disorder are also addicted to exercise. When diagnosing bulimia, exercise addiction is referred to as a compensatory behavior and indicator of the underlying disorder. Research also shows exercise addiction influences not only the development of eating disorders but also their maintenance.

== Animal models ==
As with many human diseases and disorders, animal models are sometimes used to study addiction. For example, voluntary wheel running by rodents, viewed as a model of human voluntary exercise, has been used to study withdrawal symptoms, such as changes in blood pressure, when wheel access is removed from mice.

== See also ==
- Overtraining
- Neurobiological effects of physical exercise
