= Ivy Jenkins =

Canadian bassist

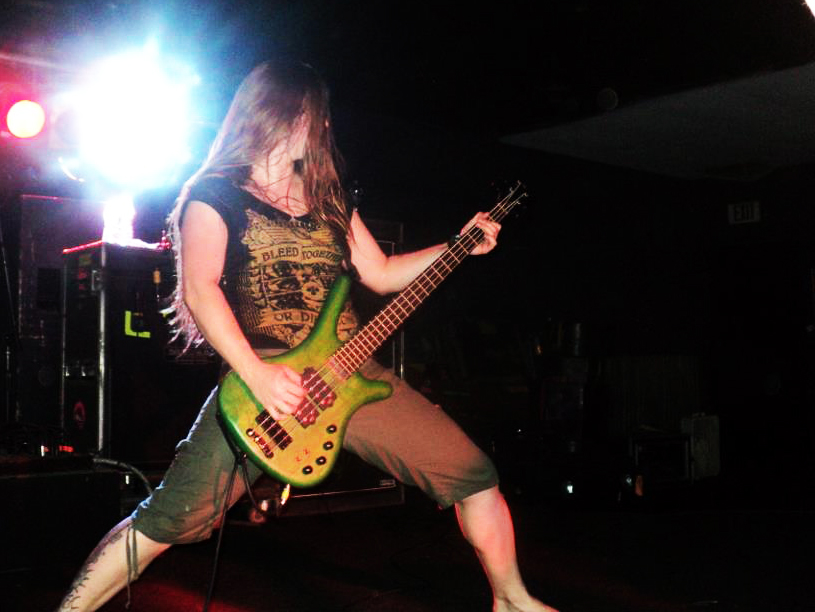
- Jenkins with Kittie in 2011

Background information
- Also known as: Ivy, Ivy Vujić Jenkins
- Born: Ivana Vujić; June 15, 1983 (age 43); Belgrade, SFR Yugoslavia (modern-day Serbia)
- Genres: Nu metal, alternative metal, groove metal
- Years active: 1998–present
- Member of: Kittie
- Formerly of: In the Wake; Speedgod
- Website: www.speedgodband.com; www.umeuscloth.com; www.ucmerch.com

Ivana "Ivy" Jenkins (née Vujić; Serbian Cyrillic: Ивана Вујић; born June 15, 1983), is a Serbian-born Canadian bassist. She is best known as the bassist for the heavy metal band Kittie over two stints, from October 2007 until March 2012, and again since January 2022.

== Career ==
Jenkins began her career with Kittie by initially filling in for ailing bassist Trish Doan in late 2007, a period which found the band playing concerts in Central and South America. Before she was in Kittie, Ivy played bass for the melodic hard rock band In The Wake from Toronto, Canada. In 2008, it was officially announced that Ivy was a full-time member of Kittie and in 2009 she appeared on their fifth studio CD, In The Black. Ivy also wrote and recorded bass for Kittie's sixth album, I've Failed You, which was released on August 15, 2011. Jenkins plays a black Warwick Corvette 5 string bass guitar. She left the band in March 2012 to pursue other interests, and was replaced by Trish Doan. Following Doan's death in 2017, she would re-join Kittie in January 2022.

Ivy is the co-owner of Umeus Cloth, a clothing line run by herself and Geoffrey Jenkins, the former vocalist of Gwen Stacy. On April 2, 2011, Ivy Vujic married Jenkins.

In 2012, Ivy and Geoff started a band called Speedgod, based in Lansing, MI. Ivy played bass guitar while her husband Geoff Jenkins was on vocals. In June 2013, they released a three-song compilation dubbed "the Summer 2013 Demos".

In January 2022 it was announced that Kittie was returning after a decade long hiatus to play the sold out When We Were Young (festival), with Ivy Vujic back on bass guitar duties. The band has since gone back into the studio to complete Fire, their seventh studio album (third with Ivy writing/recording bass).
