= Funeral for Yesterday (song) =

Single by Kittie

from the album Funeral for Yesterday
- Released: January 16, 2007
- Genre: Alternative metal
- Length: 3:24
- Label: X of Infamy Records
- Songwriter(s): Morgan Lander; Mercedes Lander
- Producer(s): Jack Ponti

Kittie singles chronology
"Into the Darkness" (2004)	"Funeral for Yesterday" (2007)	"Breathe" (2007)

"Funeral for Yesterday" is the first single and title track from Kittie's album of the same name.

The single peaked at #40 on Billboard's Mainstream Rock Songs chart shortly after its release. It was featured in the video game Project Gotham Racing 4.

== Track listing ==
No.	Title	Length
1.	"Funeral for Yesterday"	3:24

== Charts ==
Chart (2007)	Peak position
US Active Rock (Billboard)	37
US Mainstream Rock (Billboard)	40

== Personnel ==
- Morgan Lander – lead vocals, guitar
- Tara McLeod – guitar
- Trish Doan – bass
- Mercedes Lander – drums, backing vocals
