= Happy Daze Tour =

2010 American concert and wrestling tour

- Tour by Insane Clown Posse, Kottonmouth Kings, Kittie, Coolio, Necro, Juggalo Championship Wrestling
- Poster featuring Insane Clown Posse, Necro, Kottonmouth Kings, Kittie, and Coolio
- Associated album: Various
- Start date: May 9, 2010
- End date: June 12, 2010
- Legs: 1
- No. of shows: 30

Happy Daze Tour
- Promotion: Juggalo Championship Wrestling
- Date: May 15-June 12, 2010

Juggalo Championship Wrestling event chronology
← Previous; Bang! Pow! Boom! Nuclear Edition Release Party	Next → Flashlight Wrestling: Legends & Loonies

The Happy Daze Tour was a multi-day concert and professional wrestling tour produced by Psychopathic Records, a record label owned by the American horrorcore hip-hop duo, the Insane Clown Posse and their independent professional wrestling promotion Juggalo Championship Wrestling (JCW) and featured performances from the Insane Clown Posse themselves, the Kottonmouth Kings, Necro, the Canadian metal band Kittie, and Grammy Award-winning rapper Coolio. Three episodes of JCW's internet show SlamTV! Express were also taped on this tour.

== Production ==
=== Background ===
Following the release of the first three JCW videos, the company sporadically began referring to itself as Juggalo Championship Wrestling. On July 16, 2007, the company updated its website, changing all references of itself to Juggalo Championship Wrestling. Their logo, however, continued to display the words "Juggalo Championshit Wrestling" until late 2008.

In early 2010, to celebrate the release of the Bang! Pow! Boom! Nuclear Edition album, Insane Clown Posse announced that they would be doing a national tour. Dubbed the "Happy Daze Tour", the tour also featured Necro, the Kottonmouth Kings, Canadian metal band Kittie, and Grammy Award-winning rapper Coolio who had been a featured at the 2009 Gathering of the Juggalos. The tour also featured matches from the Insane Clown Posse's professional wrestling promotion, Juggalo Championship Wrestling on select dates.

=== Professional wrestling storylines ===
The Happy Daze Tour featured professional wrestling matches that involves different wrestlers from pre-existing scripted feuds and storylines. Wrestlers portrayed villains, heroes, or less distinguishable characters in scripted events that built tension and culminated in a wrestling match or series of matches. Storylines were produced on Juggalo Championship Wrestling's various events and their weekly internet program SlamTV!.

== Professional wrestling results ==
Night 1 - May 15, 2010
No.	Results	Stipulations
1	The Weedman defeated Kid Hybrid by pinfall	Singles match
2	Mad Man Pondo defeated GQ by pinfall	Singles match
3	The Thomaselli Brothers (Pauly Thomaselli and Vito Thomaselli) (c) defeated The Bump N Uglies (Bubba MacKenzie and Josh Movado) and The Jobbers (Jobber I and Jobber II) by pinfall	Three way tag team match for the JCW Tag Team Championship
4	Corporal Robinson (c) defeated Justice Jones by pinfall	Singles match for the JCW Heavyweight Championship
(c) / – the champion(s) heading into the match

Night 2 - May 16, 2010
No.	Results	Stipulations
1	The Weedman defeated Zac Vincent by pinfall	Singles match
2	Mad Man Pondo defeated Chris Miles by pinfall	Singles match
3	The Thomaselli Brothers (Pauly Thomaselli and Vito Thomaselli) (c) defeated Irish Airborne (Dave Crist and Jake Crist) by pinfall	Tag team match for the JCW Tag Team Championship
4	Corporal Robinson (c) defeated Viper by pinfall	Singles match for the JCW Heavyweight Championship
(c) / – the champion(s) heading into the match

Night 3 - May 17, 2010
No.	Results	Stipulations
1	The Weedman defeated Chris Miles and Jamie Northstar by pinfall	Three way dance
2	Mad Man Pondo defeated Jeff Mayhem by pinfall	Singles match
3	The Thomaselli Brothers (Pauly Thomaselli and Vito Thomaselli) (c) defeated The Man Scouts (Bo and Brice) by pinfall	Tag team match for the JCW Tag Team Championship
4	Corporal Robinson (c) defeated Big Nasty by pinfall	Singles match for the JCW Heavyweight Championship
(c) / – the champion(s) heading into the match

Night 4 - May 22, 2010
No.	Results	Stipulations
1	The Weedman defeated Backwoods Billy	Singles match
2	The Thomaselli Brothers (Pauly Thomaselli and Vito Thomaselli) (c) defeated The Ring Rydas Matt Magnum and Vinny Marseglia by pinfall	Tag team match for the JCW Tag Team Championship
3	Butterbean defeated Joey Eastman by knockout	Singles match
4	Mad Man Pondo defeated Corporal Robinson (c) by pinfall	Singles match for the JCW Heavyweight Championship
(c) / – the champion(s) heading into the match

Night 5 - May 24, 2010
No.	Results	Stipulations
1	Toby Klein defeated A Dead Guy, Bobby Beverly, Dave Crist, Eric Ryan, Facade, Jake Crist, Jason Gory, John Thorne, Luis Diamante, and Tarek The Legend	JCW Heavyweight Championship #1 contendership Battle royal
2	The Weedman defeated Tarek The Legend by pinfall	Singles match
3	The Thomaselli Brothers (Pauly Thomaselli and Vito Thomaselli) (c) defeated The Ring Rydas (Ring Ryda Blue and Ring Ryda Red) by pinfall	Tag team match for the JCW Tag Team Championship
4	Corporal Robinson defeated John Thorne by pinfall	Singles match
5	Mad Man Pondo (c) defeated Toby Klein by pinfall	Singles match for the JCW Heavyweight Championship
(c) / – the champion(s) heading into the match

Night 6 - May 26, 2010
No.	Results	Stipulations
1	Corporal Robinson defeated Corporal Julio-Julio by pinfall	Singles match
2	The Weedman defeated Arya Daivari by pinfall	Singles match
3	The Thomaselli Brothers (Pauly Thomaselli and Vito Thomaselli) (c) defeated The North Star Express (Darin Corbin and Ryan Cruz) by pinfall	Tag team match for the JCW Tag Team Championship
4	Mad Man Pondo (c) defeated Corporal Robinson by pinfall	Singles match for the JCW Heavyweight Championship
(c) / – the champion(s) heading into the match

Night 7 - May 27, 2010
No.	Results	Stipulations
1	The Weedman defeated Justin Fowler and The Yellow Dog by pinfall	Three way match
2	Corporal Robinson (with Violent J) defeated David Clark (with Zac James)	Singles match
3	The Thomaselli Brothers (Pauly Thomaselli and Vito Thomaselli) (c) defeated The Beautiful Bodies (Brian Gott and Derek Cornell) by pinfall	Tag team match for the JCW Tag Team Championship
4	Mad Man Pondo (c) defeated Donnie Peppercricket by pinfall	Singles match for the JCW Heavyweight Championship
(c) / – the champion(s) heading into the match

Night 8 - May 28, 2010
No.	Results	Stipulations
1	Corporal Robinson defeated Trent Stone by pinfall	Singles match
2	The Thomaselli Brothers (Pauly Thomaselli and Vito Thomaselli) (c) defeated The Beautiful Bodies (Brian Gott and Derek Cornell) by pinfall	Tag team match for the JCW Tag Team Championship
3	Mad Man Pondo (c) vs. Spotted Cow ended in a no contest	Singles match for the JCW Heavyweight Championship
4	Tracy Smothers defeated The Weedman by pinfall	Singles match
(c) / – the champion(s) heading into the match

Night 9 - May 29, 2010
No.	Results	Stipulations
1	The Weedman defeated Jeremy Wyatt by pinfall	Singles match
2	Mad Man Pondo (c) defeated CopyCat by pinfall	Singles match for the JCW Heavyweight Championship
3	The Thomaselli Brothers (Pauly Thomaselli and Vito Thomaselli) (c) defeated Mark Sterling and Superstar Steve by pinfall	Tag team match for the JCW Tag Team Championship
4	Corporal Robinson defeated Sir Bradley Charles by pinfall	Singles match
(c) / – the champion(s) heading into the match

Night 10 - May 31, 2010
No.	Results	Stipulations
1	Wardog defeated FFX and Kam Burnquist by pinfall	Three way match
2	The Weedman defeated T-Bolt by pinfall	Singles match
3	The Haters (Pauly Thomaselli and Vito Thomaselli) (c) defeated Derk Stone and The Prodigy by pinfall	Tag team match for the JCW Tag Team Championship
4	Corporal Robinson defeated Mad Man Pondo (c) by pinfall	Singles match for the JCW Heavyweight Championship
(c) / – the champion(s) heading into the match

Night 11 - June 1, 2010
No.	Results	Stipulations
1	The Weedman defeated El Gato Verde by pinfall	Singles match
2	Mad Man Pondo defeated Khan Kussion by pinfall	Singles match
3	The Haters (Pauly Thomaselli and Vito Thomaselli) (c) defeated Braddock and Matagi by pinfall	Tag team match for the JCW Tag Team Championship
4	Corporal Robinson (c) defeated Mach Martinez by pinfall	Singles match for the JCW Heavyweight Championship
(c) / – the champion(s) heading into the match

Night 12 - June 4, 2010
No.	Results	Stipulations
1	The Weedman defeated CJ Edwards by pinfall	Singles match
2	Mad Man Pondo defeated Big Vicious by pinfall	Singles match
3	The Haters (Pauly Thomaselli and Vito Thomaselli) (c) defeated Rated 2G (Badd Blood and LTP) by pinfall	Tag team match for the JCW Tag Team Championship
4	Corporal Robinson (c) defeated Tommy Celcious by pinfall	Singles match for the JCW Heavyweight Championship
(c) / – the champion(s) heading into the match

Night 13 - June 7, 2010
No.	Results	Stipulations
1	The Weedman defeated Rix Luxury by pinfall	Singles match
2	Mad Man Pondo defeated Willie Mack by pinfall	Singles match
3	The Haters (Pauly Thomaselli and Vito Thomaselli) (c) defeated The Suburban Commandos (D-Unit and T-Rent) by pinfall	Tag team match for the JCW Tag Team Championship
4	Corporal Robinson (c) defeated Joey Ryan by pinfall	Singles match for the JCW Heavyweight Championship
(c) / – the champion(s) heading into the match

Night 14 - June 9, 2010
No.	Results	Stipulations
1	The Weedman defeated Mack Havok by pinfall	Singles match
2	Mad Man Pondo defeated Mike James by pinfall	Singles match
3	The Haters (Pauly Thomaselli and Vito Thomaselli) (c) defeated The Ballard Brothers (Shane Ballard and Shannon Ballard) by pinfall	Tag team match for the JCW Tag Team Championship
4	Corporal Robinson (c) defeated Guzmania by pinfall	Singles match for the JCW Heavyweight Championship
(c) / – the champion(s) heading into the match

Night 15 - June 11, 2010
No.	Results	Stipulations
1	The Weedman defeated Mike James by pinfall	Singles match
2	Mad Man Pondo defeated Guzmania by pinfall	Singles match
3	Corporal Robinson (c) defeated Mark Kutzler by pinfall	Singles match for the JCW Heavyweight Championship
4	Corporal Robinson and The Weedman defeated The Haters (Pauly Thomaselli and Vito Thomaselli) by pinfall	Tag team non title match
(c) / – the champion(s) heading into the match

Night 16 - June 12, 2010
No.	Results	Stipulations
1	The Weedman defeated FX, KM Burnquist, and Prodigy by pinfall	Four way match
2	Mad Man Pondo defeated Mosh Pit Mike by pinfall	Singles match
3	Corporal Robinson (c) defeated Wayne Thomas by pinfall	Singles match for the JCW Heavyweight Championship
4	Corporal Robinson and The Weedman defeated The Haters (Pauly Thomaselli and Vito Thomaselli) by pinfall	Tag team non title match
(c) / – the champion(s) heading into the match

== Performers ==
- Insane Clown Posse
- Kottonmouth Kings
- Kittie
- Coolio
- Necro

== Tour dates ==
Date	City	State	Venue
May 9, 2010	Memphis	Tennessee	New Daisy Theatre
May 10, 2010	Dallas	Texas	Palladium Ballroom
May 11, 2010	Tulsa	Oklahoma	Tulsa Convention Center
May 13, 2010	Louisville	Kentucky	Inn Place Louisville Hotel
May 14, 2010	Milwaukee	Wisconsin	The Rave/Eagles Club
May 15, 2010	Rochester Hills	Michigan	Meadow Brook Music Festival
May 16, 2010	Columbus	Ohio	LC Pavilion
May 17, 2010	Charlotte	North Carolina	Uptown Amphitheatre
May 19, 2010	Philadelphia	Pennsylvania	Electric Factory
May 20, 2010	Baltimore	Maryland	Pier Six Pavilion
May 21, 2010	Worcester	Massachusetts	Worcester Palladium
May 22, 2010	Worcester	Massachusetts	Worcester Palladium
May 23, 2010	Pittsburgh	Pennsylvania	Amphitheatre at Station Square
May 24, 2010	Cleveland	Ohio	Nautica Pavilion
May 26, 2010	Minneapolis	Minnesota	Cabooze
May 27, 2010	Council Bluffs	Iowa	Westfair Amphitheater
May 28, 2010	Sauget	Illinois	Pop's Nightclub
May 29, 2010	Bonner Springs	Kansas	Capitol Federal Park
May 31, 2010	Morrison	Colorado	Red Rocks Amphitheatre
June 1, 2010	Magna	Utah	Saltair
June 3, 2010	Spokane	Washington	Knitting Factory Spokane
June 4, 2010	Portland	Oregon	Portland Expo Center
June 5, 2010	San Francisco	California	Warfield Theatre
June 7, 2010	Anaheim	California	Grove of Anaheim
June 8, 2010	Tempe	Arizona	Marquee Theatre
June 9, 2010	Tempe	Arizona	Marquee Theatre
June 10, 2010	Paradise	Nevada	House of Blues at Mandalay Bay
June 12, 2010	Farmington	New Mexico	McGee Park Coliseum
