= Siegfried Meier =

Canadian record producer

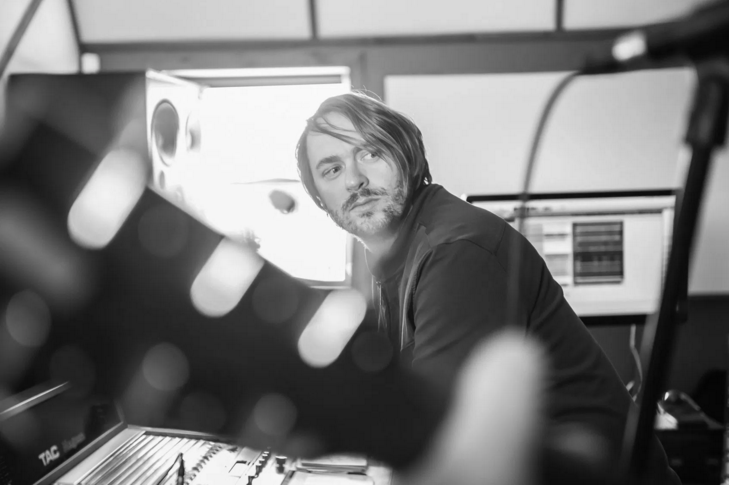

Background information
- Born: August 9, 1977 (age 49); Oberviechtach, West Germany
- Origin: Canada
- Genres: Rock, pop punk, punk, emo
- Occupations: Record producer, audio engineer
- Years active: 1997–present
- Website: siegfriedmeier.com

Siegfried Meier (born August 9, 1977) is a German-born Canadian record producer and recording, mixing and mastering engineer. He is known for his work in the genres of rock, metal, pop, and punk, producing and engineering for groups such as Face to Face, Kittie, Sectorseven, and Baptized in Blood. In 2013, Meier won a Juno award for Metal/Hard Music Album of the Year producing and engineering Woods 5: Grey Skies & Electric Light by Woods of Ypres. Meier is the owner of Ontario-based recording studio, Beach Road Studios.

== Early life ==
Born in Oberviechtach, West Germany, Meier moved to Canada at a young age. There, he began to develop an interest in music, specifically in recording his own songs. In high school, Meier played in local bands and began collecting recording equipment in order to record their efforts. In 1998, Meier pursued a degree in Audio Engineering. He attended the Ontario Institute of Audio Recording Technology, where he also worked after his degree was completed as the school's Pro Tools and Audio Production instructor.

== EMAC Recording Studios ==
Meier briefly worked in Los Angeles before returning to Ontario to work at EMAC Recording Studios. He spent from 2000 to early 2004 engineering and mastering various albums for EMAC before returning to teach at OIART.

In 2001 Meier engineered a session for Kittie's album Oracle at EMAC Studios. He also engineered, mixed and mastered Sectorseven by Sectorseven in 2002.

== Beach Road Studios ==
In 2006, Meier began building his own studio, Beach Road, in Goderich. This studio was crafted with the help of Lee While, an acoustics professor at the Ontario Institute of Audio Recording Technology as well as Robbie McCowan of Chasing Mercury. During this time, Meier continued to produce out of his own home. Albums such as Folkyo by Dayna Manning credit the facilities being used for recording the album as "Siegfried Meier's House". Here, he also produced, engineered and mixed Baptized In Blood's Baptized In Blood EP as well as Article One's AO. Once Beach Road Studios was completed in late 2006, Meier migrated his production to the new facilities.

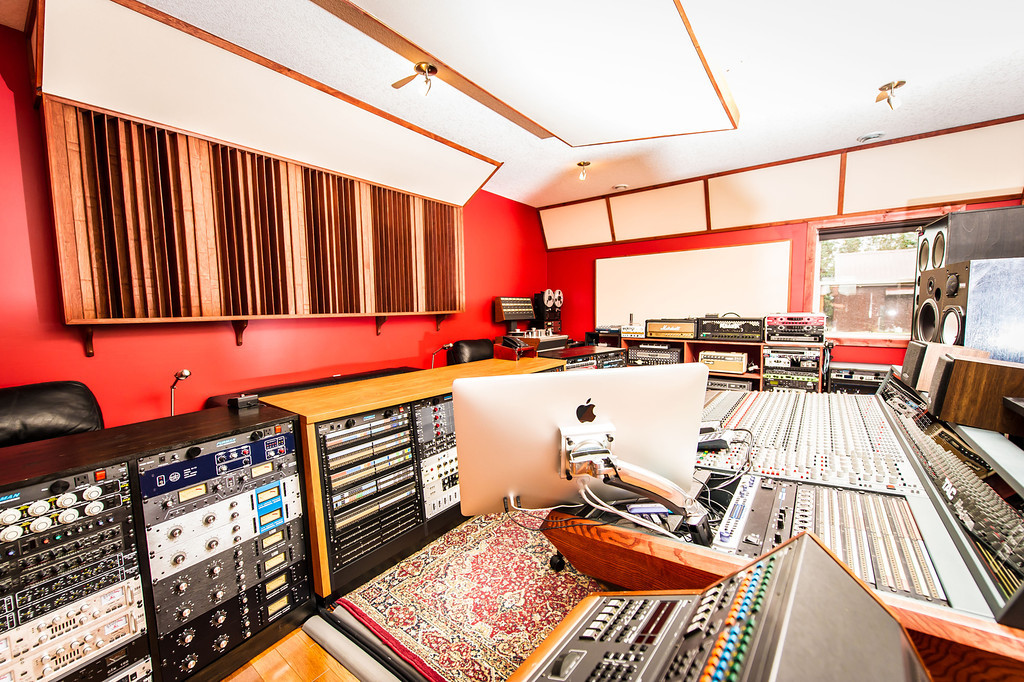
The control room at Beach Road Studios.

== Work with Kittie ==
In 2009, Meier worked again with Kittie, this time producing as well as engineering at Beach Road Studios, on their album In The Black. The album was well-received, reaching No. 18 on the Hard Rock Albums Billboard chart and No. 133 on the Top 200 Billboard chart. Meier also produced and engineered Kittie's 2011 album I've Failed You, which reached No. 10 on the Hard Rock Albums Billboard chart and No. 178 on the Top 200 Billboard chart. In 2011, Meier also produced, engineered and mixed Take It or Leave It: A Tribute to the Queens of Noise – The Runaways which featured Kittie on the song "Fantasies". In 2015, Kittie recorded a cover of David Bowie's "Space Oddity" for A Salute to the Thin White Duke – The Songs of David Bowie which was produced, engineered and mixed by Meier. Meier also worked with Kittie on the soundtrack for Saw VI in 2009, producing, engineering and mixing their song "Cut Throat".

Most recently, Meier produced, engineered, and mixed Kittie's Origins/Evolutions Live album in 2018.

== Work with Woods of Ypres ==
In 2011, Meier worked with Woods of Ypres at Beach Road Studios to produce and engineer their album, Woods 5: Grey Skies & Electric Light. The tracks were sent to mix engineer John Fryer to be mixed. However, after the album was recorded lead singer Dave Gold was killed in a car accident, halting the release of the album until the following year. The album was critically acclaimed, resulting in a nomination and win for the Juno Award for Metal/Hard Music Album of the Year.

== Current Work ==
Meier continues to work out of Beach Road Studios, producing and mixing records as well as teaching classes on audio production. He also builds and modifies audio equipment under the brand Beach Road Electronics.

Meier's most recent project has been Face to Face's Hold Fast (Acoustic Sessions), which he co-produced, mixed, and featured on. The album reached No. 18 on Alternative Album Sales and No. 40 on Rock Album Sales on Billboard's charts.

== Endorsements ==
Meier is endorsed by a variety of audio companies, including:

- Noble and Cooley
- Magix
- Radial Engineering
- HHB (Canada)
- Peluso Microphone Lab
- SJC Drums
- The Amp Factory
- Auratone Audio
- Eventide Audio

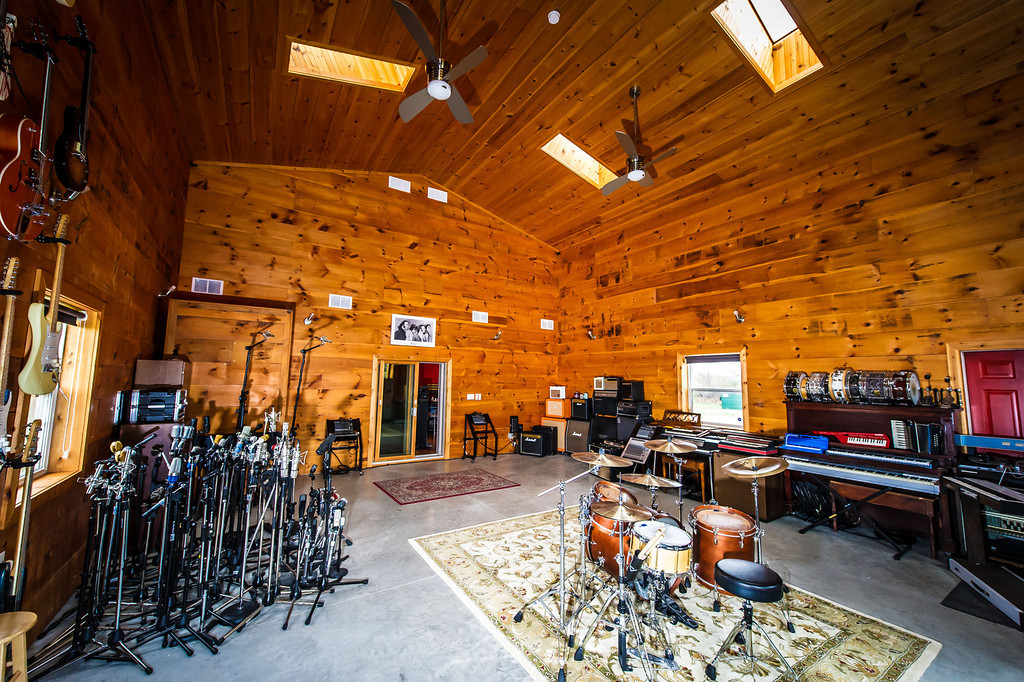
The tracking room at Beach Road Studios.

== Curtis ==
Meier is also co-founder and member of the melodic rock and punk band, Curtis. They have released various EPs and LPs over the years, namely Curtis in 1997, Thanks Stu in 1997, Live in the Studio 2004 in 2004, and Full Circle and Rarities, Randoms and Lost Souls in 2013. They are currently signed to Bright Side Records, and have been compared by Entertainment LA to groups such as Jawbreaker, Knapsack, and Sunny Day Real Estate.

== Discography ==
P = Producer

E = Engineer

M = Mixing

ME = Mastering Engineer

S = Songwriter

MU = Musician

*** = listed on http://www.siegfriedmeier.com/discography/

All non-starred albums listed on AllMusic.com

ARTIST	PROJECT	CREDITS	RELEASE
Face to Face ***	Hold Fast (Acoustic)	Co-Produce / M / MU	2018
Jared Dines/Steve Terreberry/Sarah Longfield/Tyler Larson/Adam Neely/Trey Xavier ***	Dread Machine	P / E / M	2018
Thirty Helens ***	Upcoming Full Length	P / E / M	2018
The World Over ***	Upcoming Full Length	P / E / M	2018
Stranded In Nostalgia	Forthcoming EP	P / E / M / MU / S	2018
Common Oath ***	Upcoming EP	P / E / M	2018
Adam Wendler ***	Upcoming EP	P / E / M	2018
Kittie	Origins/Evolutions (Live)	P / E / M	2018
Delta Stone and The Wardogs ***	Upcoming EP	P / E / M	2018
Thrawsunblat ***	T4	P / E / M	2018
The World Over ***	Ventifact	ME	2017
Brother Neil ***	Away Avenue Away...	ME	2017
The Bartops ***	Paid In Applause	P / E / M	2017
Hiroshima Hearts ***	Reach Out	ME	2017
The Blacklist Social ***	Blackstone	ME	2017
Charrlonmane Collective ***	Water Under The Bridge	P / E / M / MU	2017
KINK ***	Shadowed Lands	P / E / M / MU	2017
Sarah Menary ***	Bad Idea	P / E / M / MU	2017
KINK ***	Fears	P / E / M / MU	2017
Adam Wendler ***	Never Go Unknown	P / E / M / MU	2017
Ten Boy Summer ***	Ten Boy Summer	P / E / M	2017
EDDYEVVY ***	I'm Glad You Were Born	P / E / M	2017
b.d. Gottfried ***	Through The Dog's Eyes	P / E / M / MU / S	2017
Anthems In Ashes ***	Burn It Down	P / E / M	2017
Howzat ***	Luv Dust	P / E / M	2017
Howl Said The Wolves ***	Opprør	P / E / M	2017
DMX ***	We Gonna Tear Shit Up	P / E / M / MU / S	2016
Artificial Dissemination ***	Past.Present.Future.	P / E / M	2016
Vistas ***	Vistas EP	P / E / M	2016
Sadukii ***	Sadukii EP	P / E / M	2016
KINK ***	Hands	P / E / M / MU	2016
Serena Rutledge ***	Our Best Fight	P / E / M / ME / MU / S	2016
The Ashgrove ***	Time Goes By	P / E / M	2016
A Ghost Named Joe ***	Incorporeal	P / E / M	2016
Horwood ***	Art Is Time Travel	P / E / M	2016
KINK ***	Fine Lines Acoustic...literally...	P / E / M	2016
The World Over ***	Mountains	P / E / M	2016
Mudmen ***	Old Plaid Shirt	ME	2016
Thirty Helens	Vague Rants	P / E / M	2015
Sound Glyphics	Royal Blood	P / E / M	2015
hHead	Fempire – Squirtgun Records Compilation	M	2015
b.d. Gottfried	Motion Fever	P / E / M / MU / S	2015
Thrawsunblat	T3	Co-P / M / ME	2015
Painted Faces ***	Projects	P / E / M / ME	2015
Mr. Tasty	Main Course	P / E / M / ME / MU	2015
The Hoot & Yell	Upcoming EP		P / E / M / ME / MU
Kittie	Space Oddity – David Bowie Tribute Album		P / E / M / MU
Anthem For Today	This Is Not The End		P / E / M / ME / MU
Easy Does It	Upcoming Full Length		P / E / M / ME
Not Tonight & The Headaches	Upcoming Full Length		M / ME
Emerald Seas	Upcoming EP		P / E / M / ME
Artificial Dissemination	Take Us To Your Leader		P / E / M
Temple In The Sea	Upcoming EP		P / E / M / ME
Painted Faces	Vinyl Signs		P / E / M / ME
Serena Rutledge	Upcoming EP		P / E / M / ME / MU
Anthem For Today	O Little Town of Bethlehem		M / ME
The Jailer's Daughter	EP 2014		P / E / M / ME
The Ending To This Story	Safe and Sound		P / E / M / ME / MU
Mountain of Wolves	Mountain of Wolves		E / ME
The Feels	Live at Beach Road		P / E / M / ME
Stratos	Upcoming Full Length		ME
The Affair	Remember To Forget		P / E / M / ME / MU
The Disenders	2 Singles 2014		P / E / M
That Dirty Racket	Upcoming EP		ME
Carly Thomas	Explode		ME
Fun Fact	Upcoming EP		ME
Trevor James & TPG	Huron		P / E / M / ME
Mike Tompkins	Sorry Not Sorry		M
Howl Said The Wolves	Without		P / E / M / ME
Pile High	Pile High		P / E / M / ME / MU / S
Elastic	The Disillusioning		P / E / M / ME
The Painted Dogs	Upcoming Full Length		P / E / M / ME
Emerald Seas	Obstacles		P / E / M / ME / MU
Breaching Vista	Your Calling		P / E / M / ME / MU
Scotty James	Run From You		M
Stereo Sunrise	EP 2014		P / E / M / ME
Halfway To Barstow	EP 2014		P / E / M / ME
Gord Prior	Single 2014		P / E / M / ME
Punishment	2 Singles		P / E / M / ME
Stuck Out Here	Getting Used To Feeling Like Shit		P / E / M / ME
The Alcoholly's	Girls Night		P / E / M / ME
Painted Faces	The Drawing Board		P / E / M / ME
Gag Order	EP 2013		P / E / M / ME
Slouch	EP 2013		P / E / M / ME
Gord Prior	Sweet Corn Ahead		P / E / M / ME
Terrified & Alive	EP 2013		P / E / M / ME / MU
Curtis	Full Circle		P / E / M / MU / S
Curtis	Rarities, Randoms & Lost Souls		P / E / M / MU / S
Gord Prior	AUM		P / E / M / ME
The Affair	Live at Beach Road EP		P / E / M / ME
Steven Stunning	2 Singles		P / E / M / ME
Baker Kane	Single		P / E / M / ME
The Wedding Party	2 Singles		P / E /
Gypsy Chief Goliath	New Machines of the Night		ME
Besieged	Victims Beyond All Help		ME
Rep By Pop	Harper = Nixon		ME
Thrawsunblat	Wanderer on The Continent of Saplings		Co-P / M / ME
The Ending To This Story	The Phoenix		P / E / M / ME / MU
River City Ransom	Live Recordings		P / E / M / ME
The Alcoholly's	Flashback EP		P / E / M / ME
The Disenders	Broken Town		P / E / M
The Light Division	Fear and Fortune		P / E / M
Halfway To Barstow	EP 2013		P / E / M / ME
To Tell	Only In Love		E / M / ME
Bright Side Records Comp	Vol. 1		P / E / M
Stacey Jamieson	Full Length		M / ME
Scotty James	This Christmas		P / E / M / MU
Ryan Mills	The Drive		P / E / M / ME
Woods of Ypres	Grey Skies & Electric Light		P / E
The Wedding Party	Single		P / E / M
Mouth	EP 2013		P / E / M / ME
Motes and Oats	Simple Things		M / ME
My Life's Monument	The Architect		P / E / M / ME
The Best Kept Secret	EP		P / E / M / ME
Deserter	EP		P / E / M / ME
Mallory Tomiuk	EP		P / E / M / ME
Chasing Mercury	Forward In Reverse		P / E / M / ME
Eagle & Child	EP		P / E / M / ME
This Time or Next Time	What a Way To Say Goodbye		P / E / M / ME / MU
Searching For Satellites	EP		P / E / M / ME
Repeller	2 Song EP		P / E / M / ME
Remembering Apollo	Niobe's Tears		P / E / M / ME
Credit Valley	EP		P / E / M / ME
Battle Mountain Band	EP 2012		P / E
Chris Hart	Rock & Roll Revelation		M / ME
Wuud	Nothing's Worth Keeping		M / ME
Terrified & Alive	EP 2012		P E / M / ME / MU
Baker Kane	Almost Everything		P / E / M / ME
The Salads	Music Every Day		P / E
The Wedding Party	Brothers EP		P / E / M
Curtis	Love Gun (Kiss Tribute)		P / E / M / ME / MU
Kissin' Time	Canada's Tribute To Kiss		ME
Twelfth Night Overture	Stratford Festival Theatre		E / M / ME
Kittie	I've Failed You		P / E / M
Breaching Vista	Vera City		P / E / M / MU
Gord Prior	These Are Killers		P / E / M / ME
Craig Cardiff	Safe Here		M / ME
Scotty James	Wanna Be Loved EP		P / E / M / MU
Gord Prior	Waiting In The Hall		P / E / M / ME
Stuck Out Here	Last Night, This Morning		P / E / M / ME
Split The Skye	The Return		P / E / M
Bryce Jardine	EP/Demos		P / E / M / ME
Benefit of a Doubt	The Storm		P / E / M / MU
Flatland	EP		P / E / M / ME
Anatomist	EP		P / E / M / ME
1951	EP		M / ME
All The Trendy Kids	These Kids		P / E / M / ME
Velvet Revolver f. Gord Prior	Muthafucka		E
Moondog Uproar	Albatross		P / E / M
The Dunes	Let It Go (Limitless)		P / E / M
Searching For Satellites	EP 2010		P / E / M
Thine Eyes Bleed	The Embers Rise		P / E / M
Kittie	Fantasies (Runaways Tribute)		P / E / M
Surrounded by Water	Oblivious		P / E / M
Nick Harris	I Was In A Band		P / E / M / ME
Yours To Call	EP		P / E / M / ME
Solvi	A Million Faces		P / E / M
Escapes	EP		M / ME
Metro4	Full Length		P / E
The Sunset Summer	EP		P / E / M / ME
Stagehands	The Silent City		P / E / M
Kittie	Cut Throat (Diary of Wimpy Kid)		P / E / M
Sector Seven	The Hunt Club		P / E / M / MU
The Soap Opera Coma	The Rising Co$t of Living		P / E / M / MU
Armour	EP		P / E / M
To Tell	So Much More		P / E / M / MU
The Disenders	Hold On		P / E / M
Radio Adelaide	...and on the Brighter Side Of		P / E / M / MU
Kittie	Cut Throat (Saw VI)		P / E / M
The Dunes	Subject To Change		P / E / M / MU
The Light Division	Oh So Close		P / E / M / MU
Acacia	Our Own		P / E / M / ME
Dog Tooth Violet	Dog Tooth Violet		P / E / M
Kaffe	Full Length		P / E / M
The Bad Ideas	Dirty Little Looks		P / E / M / ME
Tyler Schwende Band	Beautiful Catastrophe		M
Life Like Rockets	Life Like Rockets		P / E / M / MU / ME
Ill Eagle	Bridge		P / E / M / ME
Baptized In Blood	Gutterbound		ME
Moondog Uproar	Sunrise		P / E / M
Wuud	Resurrection Songs		ME
Chris Hart	The Magic Hour		M / ME
Farewell To Freeway	Only Time Will Tell		E
The Vice	EP		P / E / M / MU
Kittie	In The Black		P / E
Breaching Vista	Breaking The View		P / E / M / MU
Benefit of a Doubt	EP		P / E / M / MU
Riverside	Newspeak		P / E / M / MU
Policies and Procedures	EP		P / E / M / ME
Timothy James Morrow	Closure		P / E / M / MU
Kaffe	Toque de Rock		M
Jon Bartel	Found and Finding		ME
Hijack Delta	EP		P / E / M / ME
Ryan Mills	Start With (Seaweed Tribute)		P / E / M
Awake and Dreaming	It's Always Midnight In Sin City		M
To Tell	The Sun Is Up & So Am I		P / E / M / MU / ME
Thine Eyes Bleed	Thine Eyes Bleed		P / E
Bordertown	Welcome To		P / E / M / MU
The Synaesthetic	Locomotive		P / E / M
Teeter	Demos/EP		P / E / M / ME
Paris Burning	EP		P / E / M / MU / ME
Seconds To Go	Mucho Respecto		P / E / M / ME
Perry's Faultline	Thousand Trials		P / E / M
Riverside	Goodbye Broadway		P / E / M / MU / ME
Planet4	My Vintage Future		P / E / M / MU
Ryan Mills	Deepest Blue		P / E / M / MU
Chasing Mercury	Midnight at the Ball		P / E / M
The Synaesthetic	Distractions		P / E / M
Article One	Article One		P / E / M / MU
Seconds To Go	Seconds To Go		P / E / M
Dressed In Sunday's Best	And We're Not Finished Yet		P / E / M / ME
Dayna Manning	Folkyo		P / E / M / ME
Paul Kramer	Sleeping Dogs Lie		E / M / ME
Suzanne Frank	First Flight		E / M / ME
Machete Avenue	The First Cuts		P / E / M / MU / ME
Tyler Schwende Band	EP		ME
Scenario	EP		P / E / M / MU / ME
Prize Fighter	EP		M
The Soap Opera Coma	We Came For The Blood		P / E / M / ME
Bordertown	New Car Smell		P / E / M / MU / ME
Baptized In Blood	EP		P / E / M / ME
Chasing Mercury	EP		P / E / M
Riverside	EP		P / E / M / MU / ME
Matthew Johnston	EP		P / E / M / MU / ME
Icewater	Meltdown		ME
Drive By Satellite	Drive By Satellite		SE
Adam McGill	EP		P / E / M / ME
Memory Bank	Litany and Lethargy		E / M
The Racket	The Racket		P / E / M / MU / ME
Promdate	EP		P / E / M / MU
Broken Glass Wings	Stiletto Killers		P / E / M / MU / ME
Capeside	A Thousand Silent Voices		P / E / M / ME / MU
Blue Skies at War	You Pour The Gasoline, I'll Light The Match		P / E / M / MU
Kover	Kover		P / E / M / MU / ME
The Salads	Eurotrip Soundtrack		E / M / ME
Turn Off The Stars	Everything Is Okay		E / M
Sherry	Sherry		SE
Drawing Boxes	Drawing Boxes		PT Editing / Mix Assistant
Paris Burning	EP		P / E / M / MU / ME
The Breakup	EP		P / E / M / ME
Kottintrip	Home		P / E / M
Brian Sullivan	Becoming		E / MU
Holly McNarland	Live at the Great Hall		PT Editing / Assistant Engineer
Carly Thomas	Distance		Assistant Engineer
The Salads	Fold A To B		E / M / ME
The Last Supper	Served		E / M / ME
Tony Nother	Stepping Out		E / M / ME
The Pillowheads	Society Has Murdered Me		E / M / ME
The Ken Varley Trio	Basically For You		Assistant Engineer
Bobnoxious	Bobnoxious		M / ME
Jersey	Generation Genocide		E / PT Editing / Mix Assistant
Sector Seven	Black		Co-P / E / M / ME
Jackie Ungar	One Step		E / PT Editing / M / MU
Kittie	Oracle		Assistant Engineer
0.5	Peacemaker		E / PT Editing
Clockwise	Clockwise		PT Editing / Assistant Engineer
Denise Pelley	I'm Home		PT Editing / Assistant Engineer
Sharon Costello	August Light		PT Editing / Assistant Engineer
Curtis	Thanks Stu		P / E / M / MU
Curtis	Curtis		P / E / M / MU
21and9	So...EP (2021)		P / E / M
21and9	Balloons EP (2023)		P / E
21and9	To Be Released EP (2026)		P / E / M
