= Overtraining =

Result from excessive strenuous exercise

Overtraining occurs when a person exceeds their body's ability to recover from strenuous exercise. Overtraining can be described as a point at which a person may have a decrease in performance or plateau as a result of failure to perform at a certain level or training-load consistently; a load which exceeds their recovery capacity. People who are overtrained cease making progress, and can even begin to lose strength and fitness. Overtraining is also known as chronic fatigue, burnout, and overstress in athletes.

It is suggested that there are different forms of overtraining. Firstly, "monotonous program overtraining" suggests that repetition of the same movement, such as certain weight lifting and baseball batting, can cause performance plateau due to an adaption of the central nervous system, which results from a lack of stimulation. A second example of overtraining is described as "chronic overwork-type," wherein the subject may be training with too high intensity or high volume and not allowing sufficient recovery time for the body.

Up to 10% of elite endurance athletes and 10% of American college swimmers are affected by overtraining syndrome (i.e., unexplained underperformance for approximately 2 weeks, even after having adequate resting time).

== Signs and symptoms ==
Overtraining may be accompanied by one or more concomitant signs:

- Persistent muscle soreness
- Persistent fatigue, different from just being tired from a hard training session—occurs when fatigue continues even after adequate rest
- "Central fatigue can take the form of losing the desire or motivation to continue exercise or a decline in some aspect of the motor skills associated with continued exercise"
- Elevated resting heart rate – a persistently high heart-rate after adequate rest, such as in the morning after sleep, can indicate overtraining
- Reduced heart rate variability
- Increased susceptibility to infections
- Increased incidence of injuries
- Irritability
- Depression
- Burnout

"Symptoms of overtraining include muscle soreness, boredom, poor motivation, sleep problems, increased morning pulse rate, diminished sex drive, a drop in energy, decreased resistance to illness, poor appetite and weight loss."

There is a difference between overtraining and overreaching; overreaching is when an athlete is undergoing hard training but with adequate recovery; overtraining, however, is when an athlete is undergoing hard training without proper recovery. With over-reaching, the consequential drop in performance can be resolved in a few days or weeks.

=== Performance ===
- Early onset of fatigue
- Decreased aerobic capacity (VO_{2} max)
- Poor physical performance
- Inability to complete workouts
- Delayed recovery

Overtraining can affect the athlete's athletic ability and other areas of life, such as performance in studies or the workforce. An overtrained athlete who is suffering from physical and/or psychological distress could also have trouble socializing with friends and family, studying for an exam, or preparing for work.

== Mechanism ==
A number of possible mechanisms for overtraining have been proposed. One stipulates that microtrauma to the muscles are created faster than the body can heal them. Another proposes that amino acids are used up faster than they are supplied in the diet, a condition sometimes referred to as "protein deficiency". Finally, systemic inflammation has been considered as a mechanism in which the release of cytokines activates an excessive immune response.

== Treatment ==
=== Recovery ===
The most effective way to treat the effects of overtraining is to allow the body enough time to recover:

- Taking a break from training to allow time for recovery.
- Reducing volume and/or intensity of training.
- Suitable periodization of training.
- Splitting the training program so that different sets of muscles are worked on different days.
- Increase sleep time.
- Deep-tissue or sports massage of the affected muscles.
- Self-massage or rub down of the affected muscles.
- Short sprints with long resting time once the athlete is able to continue with light training.

=== Diet ===
Adapting nutritional intake can help to prevent and treat overtraining. Athletes in different fields will emphasize different proportional nutrition factors on the diet mainly including proteins, carbohydrates and fats. The diet includes a calorie intake that at least matches expenditure, ideally forming a suitable macronutrient ratio. During the recovery process, extra calories from diets may help the body speed the recovery. Keeping the body nourished with a balanced diet and hydrated with an adequate supply of water are both important for a successful recovery. Finally, addressing vitamin deficiencies with improved diet and/or nutritional supplements has been proposed as a way to speed up recovery.

== Rhabdomyolysis ==
Exertional rhabdomyolysis is an extreme and potentially deadly form of overtraining that leads to a breakdown of skeletal muscle which makes its way into the blood. Many molecules such as potassium, creatine kinase, phosphate, and myoglobin are released into circulation. Myoglobin is the protein that causes the lethal reaction in the body. Early detection of the syndrome is essential in full recovery. A serious late complication of rhabdomyolysis which occurs in 15% of the population is acute kidney injury, and in some cases it can lead to death.

=== Clinical presentation ===
- Muscle pain
- Tenderness
- Swelling
- Weakness
- Bruising
- Tea colored urine
- Fever
- Malaise
- Nausea
- Emesis
- Confusion
- Agitation
- Delirium
- Anuria

=== CrossFit and rhabdomyolysis ===
As CrossFit has become more and more prevalent and popular, this has led to speculation that spikes in rhabdomyolysis cases are related to CrossFit. According to a study performed in the Journal of Strength and Conditioning Research, unless performed incorrectly and in harmful environments, CrossFit presents no serious physical threat to the human body, and research into whether rhabdomyolysis cases and CrossFit are correlated is inconclusive.

== Prevention ==
Passive recovery, instead of active recovery, is a form of rest that is recommended to be performed by athletes in between rigorous, intermittent exercise. With active recovery, time to exhaustion is much shorter because the muscles are deoxygenated at a much quicker rate than with passive recovery. Thus, if avoiding overtraining means preventing exhaustion, passive recovery or "static rest" is safest. "Five weeks of rest appreciably improve both performance and mood state, and there is growing evidence that a very low level of exercise will speed recovery." If active recovery is performed during intense exercise, an athlete may find themselves in a state of being overtrained. The gradual variation of intensity and volume of training is also an effective way to prevent overtraining.

== See also ==
- Overuse injuries
- Training to failure
