= Anorexia athletica =

Eating disorder characterized by excessive and compulsive exercise

Anorexia athletica (sports anorexia), also referred to as hyper-gymnasia, is an eating disorder characterized by excessive and compulsive exercise. An athlete with sports anorexia tends to overexercise, to give themselves a sense of having control over their body. Most often, people with the disorder tend to feel they have no control over their lives, other than their control of food and exercise. In actuality, they have no control; they cannot stop exercising or regulating food intake without feeling guilty. Generally, once the activity is started, it is difficult to stop, because the person is seen as being addicted to the method adopted.

Anorexia athletica is used to refer to "a disorder for athletes who engage in at least one unhealthy method of weight control". Unlike anorexia nervosa, anorexia athletica does not have as much to do with body image as it does with performance. Athletes usually begin by eating more 'healthy' foods, as well as increasing their training. People feel like that is not enough and start working out excessively and cutting back their caloric intake, until it becomes a psychological disorder.

Hypergymnasia and anorexia athletica are not recognized as mental disorders in medical manuals such as the ICD-11 or the DSM-5. There are limited studies on the exact prevalence of anorexia athletica, but it has been found to be more common among elite athletes than the general population.

== Signs and symptoms ==
Someone with anorexia athletica can experience numerous signs and symptoms, a few of which are listed below. The seriousness of the symptoms is dependent on the individual, and more symptoms come with the length the athlete excessively exercises. If anorexia athletica persists for long enough, the individual can become malnourished, which eventually leads to further complications in major organs such as the liver, kidney, heart and brain.

- Excessive exercise
- Obsessive behavior with calories, fat, and weight
- Self-worth is based on physical performance
- Enjoyment of sports is diminished or gone
- Denying that the over-exercising is a problem

== Causes ==
There is not one single cause of anorexia athletica, but many factors that are involved in the disorder. Research has shown that an area on chromosome 1 is linked to anorexia nervosa-sports anorexia. Thus, a person is more likely to have anorexia athletica if someone in their immediate family has had the disorder. Besides genetics, the environment a person is in, has a major impact on the disorder. Coaches and parents often suggest to their athlete/child to lose weight in order to perform better.

Researchers have examined the prevalence in certain types of sports. Sports such as figure skating, ballet, gymnastics, and cheerleading promote the ideal of a thin figure for both male and female athletes. Other common archetypes include the pursuit of a certain body aesthetic, such as in gymnastics; the need to be in a certain weight categorisation in order to compete, as seen in martial arts, boxing, and wrestling; and endurance sports, such as running, where weight and performance are closely linked. Other sports with a high possibility of anorexia athletica are rowing, dancing, ski jumping, cross-country skiing and biathlon.

Females who partake in sports can develop a syndrome known as the triad. The female athlete triad was recognized in 1992 and is defined as a spectrum disorder of three interrelated components: (1) low energy availability due to disordered eating, eating disorder, or lack of nutrition relative to caloric expenditure; (2) menstrual dysfunction; and (3) low bone mineral density (BMD). The media play a very significant role in pressuring athletes to have the perfect body and to be thin, which can also trigger sports anorexia.

== Treatment ==
According to the National Eating Disorder Information Centre (NEDIC), the first step for someone going through anorexia athletica is to realize their eating and exercise habits are hurting them. Once an individual has realized they have a disorder, an appointment should be made with the family doctor. A family doctor can advise further medical attention if needed. With sports anorexia, it is important to go to a dietitian as well as a personal trainer. People with sports anorexia need to learn the balance between exercise and caloric intake.

== See also ==
- Eating disorders
- Exercise addiction
- Exercise bulimia
- Female athlete triad syndrome
- Muscle dysmorphia
- Overtraining
