= Heavy metal bass =

Heavy metal instrument and associated playing style

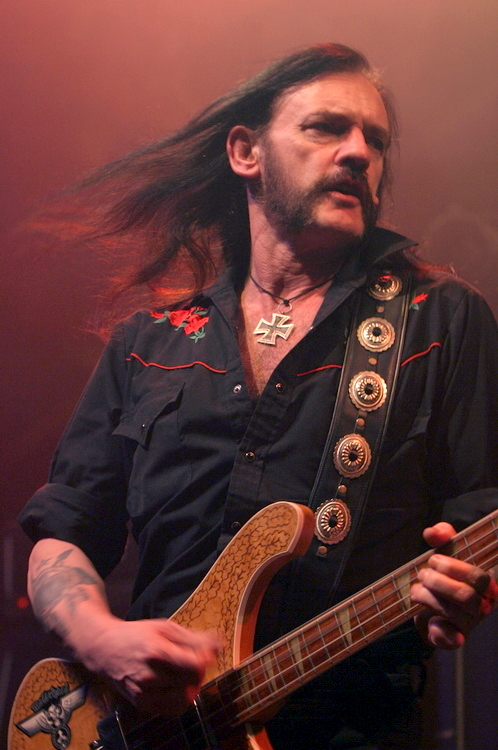
Lemmy Kilmister, the lead singer and bassist of Motörhead, performing in 2005.

Heavy metal bass is the use of the bass guitar (also called "electric bass") in the rock music genres of heavy metal and hard rock. The bassist is part of the rhythm section in a heavy metal band, along with the drummer, rhythm guitarist and, in some bands, a keyboard player. The prominent role of the bass is key to the metal sound, and the interplay of bass and distorted electric guitar is a central element of metal. The bass guitar provides the low-end sound crucial to making the music "heavy". The bass plays a crucial role in heavy metal and a more important role than in traditional rock.

Metal bassists play many different types of basslines, depending on the subgenre they are playing in and their personal playing style. Metal bass lines vary in complexity, from holding down a low pedal point as a foundation for the band's sound to doubling complex riffs and licks along with the lead guitar and/or rhythm guitars. Some bands feature the bass as a lead instrument, an approach popularized by Metallica's Cliff Burton with his emphasis on bass guitar solos and use of chords while playing bass in the early 1980s. Some metal bassists sing lead vocals while they play bass, such as Lemmy Kilmister of Motörhead and Tom Araya of Slayer. Some metal bassists sing backup vocals while they play bass.

== Roles and playing styles ==
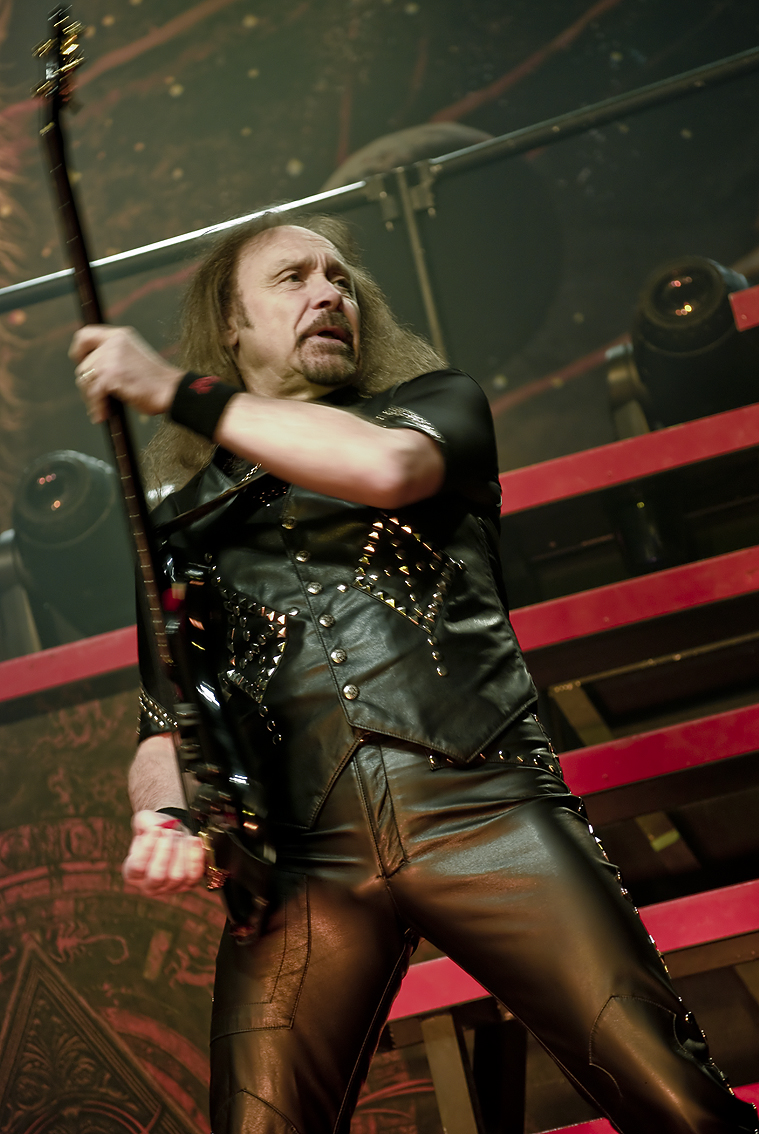
Bass guitarist Ian Hill from the heavy metal band Judas Priest. A red pick can be seen in his plucking hand.

Most metal bassists play by plucking the strings with their fingers or by picking with a plectrum, often known as a pick. Using a pick can enable bassists to play rapid repeated notes and fast basslines, although some bassists, such as Steve Harris, Steve Di Giorgio and Alex Webster play such basslines without the use of a plectrum. While the types of bass lines vary in different metal subgenres, the bassist usually fulfills a similar role: anchoring the harmonic framework with bass notes that emphasize the roots of the chords and, along with the drums and rhythm guitar, establishing the beat. The bass is also used a solo instrument in some metal styles. While four-string basses (tuned E, A, D, G from lowest string to highest string) are the most common, since the 1990s, some metal bassists have used five-string basses for added lower range—a low "B". Five string basses are used in nu metal, as well as death metal, progressive metal and other heavy metal subgenres, to complement the downtuned guitars use by the guitarists. The five string bass is not an essential part to these genres, as some bands in these genres use standard tuned guitars or downtuned four string basses. Some bassists, such as John Myung from the progressive metal band Dream Theater, utilize a six string bass, which usually adds an additional high "C" above the "G" string of a five string bass. Most metal bassists play with fretted instruments, which have metal frets on the fingerboard. However, there are a few bassists such as Steve Di Giorgio, Sean Malone and Jeroen Paul Thesseling who use fretless basses.

Most of the time, metal bass players play basslines which consist of a single note played at a time; that is, without playing multiple notes at the same time to form chords, the way a rhythm guitarist would on an electric guitar. There are, however, a few metal bassists who play chords. Robert Trujillo of Metallica is known for playing "massive chords" and "chord-based harmonics" on the bass. Lemmy of Motörhead often played power chords in his bass lines. When asked about whether he had begun as a rhythm guitarist, he stated:

No, I play a lot of notes, but I also play a lot of chords. And I play a lot of open strings. I just don't play like a bass player. There are complaints about me from time to time. It's not like having a bass player; it's like having a deep guitarist.

=== Soloing ===
While bass guitar solos are much less common in metal than guitar solos for electric guitar, some metal bassists do play solos. Bass guitar solos are structured and performed in a similar fashion as rock guitar solos, often with the musical accompaniment from the verse or chorus sections. Bass solos are performed using a range of different techniques, such as plucking or fingerpicking. A small number of metal bassists do two-handed tapping styles in which they use both hands to play notes on the fretboard by rapidly pressing and holding the string to the fret. Players noted for this soloing technique include Cliff Burton and shred guitar-style bassist Billy Sheehan. Led Zeppelin's "Good Times Bad Times", the first song on their first album, contains two brief bass solos, occurring after the song's first and third choruses. Queen's bassist, John Deacon, occasionally played bass solos, such as on the song "Liar". Metallica's 1983 debut Kill 'Em All includes the song "(Anesthesia) Pulling Teeth," consisting entirely of a bass solo played by Cliff Burton. Manowar's bassist Joey DeMaio uses special piccolo bass for his extremely fast bass solos like "Sting of the Bumblebee" and "William's Tale".

Heavy metal bass players such as Geezer Butler (Black Sabbath), Alex Webster (Cannibal Corpse), Cliff Burton (Metallica), and Les Claypool (Primus, Blind Illusion) have used chime-like harmonics and rapid plucking techniques in their bass solos. In both published Van Halen concert videos, Michael Anthony performs unique maneuvers and actions during his solos. When playing bass solos, rock and metal bassists sometimes use effects such as fuzz bass or a wah-wah pedal to produce a more pronounced sound. Notably, Cliff Burton of Metallica used both effects. Due to the lower range of the bass, bass guitar solos usually have a much lighter accompaniment than solos for other instruments. In some cases, the bass guitar solo is unaccompanied, or accompanied only by the drums.

=== Training ===
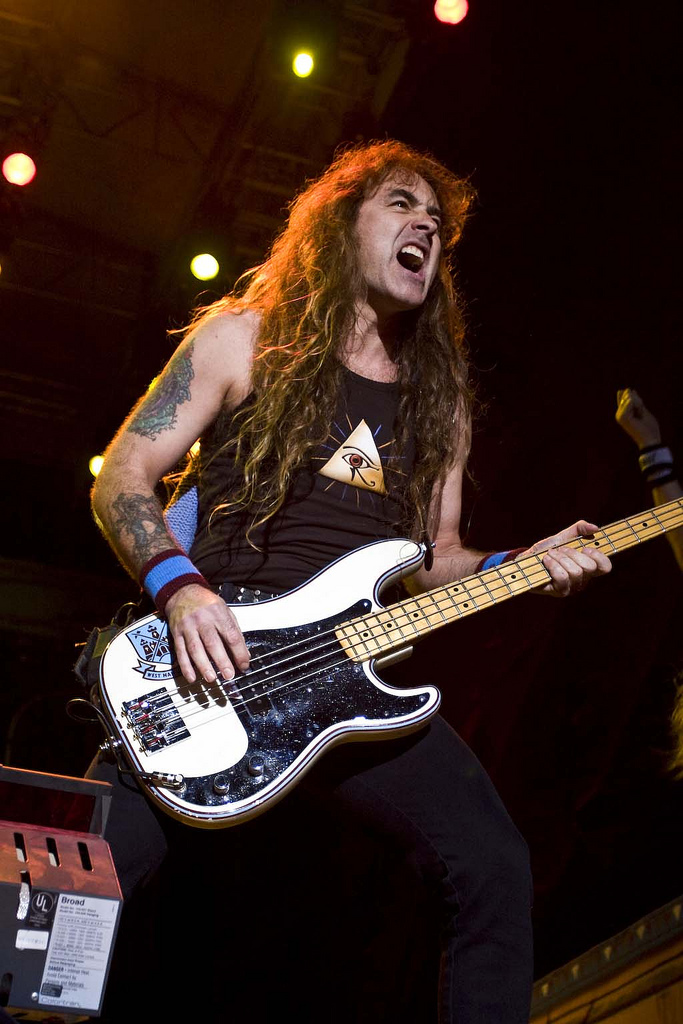
Steve Harris from Iron Maiden performing in 2008.

There is much less formal training available in college and university for metal bass, the way there is for bass guitarists learning jazz and the mainstream commercial genres (rock, R&B, etc.). Many metal bass players learn by ear, by copying bass lines from records and CDs, and by playing in a number of bands, which may include cover bands and tribute bands. Metal bassists may be able to take lessons from expert metal players or teachers. They may also be able to adapt techniques from other genres to the metal genre. As well, there are a range of books, playing methods, and, since the 1990s and 2000s, instructional DVDs and YouTube videos on how to play metal bass.

=== Roles ===
Metal bassists play in groups ranging in size from the power trio (guitar, bass and drums, with one or more of the members singing) to larger bands with multiple guitarists, keyboards, a bassist, a drummer and a vocalist. Some metal bassists sing lead vocals while they play bass, a role that Lemmy Kilmister of Motörhead did, and which Tom Araya of Slayer and Grutle Kjellson of Enslaved continue to do. Some metal bassists sing backup vocals while they play bass. Some metal bassists are also bandleaders or songwriters for their bands examples being Steve Harris and Nikki Sixx. In a few cases, traditional metal group bass players have also played another instrument, such as Led Zeppelin's John Paul Jones, who played Hammond organ on some songs or the bassists from mainstream metal bands such as Styx and the Scorpions who use a pedal keyboard, which is played with the feet.

Professional metal bassists may have a bass technician who tunes their basses before and during a performance, sets up the speaker cabinets, amplifiers and effects units, and performs routine maintenance on the instruments and equipment (e.g., changing strings, replacing speakers, replacing amplifier tubes, etc.).

== Role of women ==
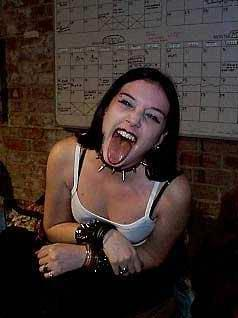
Talena Atfield of the Canadian metal band Kittie.

In relation to the gender composition of heavy metal bands, it has been said that "[h]eavy metal performers are almost exclusively male" "... [a]t least until the mid-1980s" apart from "... exceptions such as Girlschool." However, "... now [in the 2010s] maybe more than ever–strong metal women have put up their dukes and got down to it","carv[ing] out a considerable place for [them]selves." Given that most heavy metal musicians are male, most metal bassists are male. Almost all of the most well-known metal bassists are male.

Women have less roles in rock music genres like metal because the "... rebellion of rock music was largely a male rebellion." Philip Auslander says that "Although there were many women in rock by the late 1960s, most performed only as singers, a traditionally feminine position in popular music". Though some women played instruments in American all-female garage rock bands, none of these bands achieved more than regional success. So they "did not provide viable templates for women's on-going participation in rock". When the female bassist and singer Suzi Quatro emerged in 1973, "no other prominent female musician worked in rock simultaneously as a singer, instrumentalist, songwriter, and bandleader". She was "kicking down the male door in rock and roll and proving that a female musician ... and this is a point I am extremely concerned about ... could play as well if not better than the boys".

Notable women metal bassists include:

- Jennifer Arroyo from the Canadian metal band Kittie
- Talena Atfield (Kittie)
- Jo Bench from the death metal band Bolt Thrower
- Suzi Quatro (hard rock)
- Jeanne Sagan from All That Remains and The Acacia Strain
- Sean Yseult of White Zombie
- Alla Fedynitch
- Share Ross from Vixen
- Gail Greenwood of L7

== Equipment ==
=== Bass guitars ===
Some metal bassists use unusually-shaped instruments, such as Gene Simmons from Kiss, who had an instrument custom made in the shape of an axe, or those who use instruments like ES Guitars' Avenger, which has a jagged design. Many metal bassists use electric bass guitars that are used in other rock genres, such as the Fender Precision Bass.

=== Amplifiers and effects ===
Heavy metal bassists use many different brands of bass amplifiers and speaker cabinets to make the instrument sound loud enough on stage. Bass players also use their amplifier's preamp, gain, overdrive (if present) and tone controls to create their unique personal bass sound. In some genres of music, such as folk and small combo jazz, the other instruments are often acoustic and so bass players in these styles may not need large, powerful bass amps. However, in heavy metal live performances, loudness—an "onslaught of sound," in sociologist Deena Weinstein's description—is considered vital. The need for a loud volume in metal bands is even more paramount in large performance venues, such as stadiums. To get a loud enough bass sound to compete with the loudly amplified electric guitars and the large drum kits used in metal, metal bassists typically use large bass speaker cabinets stacked on top of each other–"bass stacks"–powered by high-wattage amplifiers. Traditional heavy metal bands were early users of "bass stacks". Bassist Alex Webster from the death metal band Cannibal Corpse plays with two 8x10 speaker cabinets (each cabinet contains eight 10" speakers).

One early bass stack was the 300-watt Super Vacuum Tube (SVT) amplifier head, which was intended for large performance venues. The SVT was intended for use with one or two speaker cabinets containing eight 10" speakers. Some metal bassists use vacuum tube amplifiers, which were the dominant active electronic components in bass amplifiers manufactured until the early 1970s. Many bass players believe that tube amplifiers produce a "warmer" or more "natural" sound than solid state amplifiers when lightly or moderately overdriven, and more pleasing distortion characteristics when heavily overdriven.

Some metal bassists play with a fuzz bass tone, which is obtained by overdriving the bass signal. Cliff Burton of Metallica used fuzz bass. Lemmy Kilmister, the bassist for Motörhead, obtains a natural fuzz bass tone by overdriving his twin 100 watt Marshall Bass stacks. Fuzz bass can also be obtained with a bass overdrive pedal or an "overdrive" or distortion effect built into their bass amp. The Peavey Century 200 has an onboard "distortion" effect on the second channel. The Peavey VB-2 also has built-in overdrive. Aguilar Amplification's AG 500 bass head is a two-channel amplifier, one of which offers a "saturation" control for overdrive. Metal bassists may also use other effects to alter their bass sound, such as a wah pedal (e.g., Cliff Burton) or an audio compressor to smooth out the sound.

== See also ==
- Heavy metal singing
- Heavy metal guitar
- Heavy metal drumming
- Heavy metal lyrics

== Works cited ==
- Weinstein, Deena (1991). Heavy Metal: A Cultural Sociology. Lexington. ISBN 0-669-21837-5. Revised edition: (2000). Heavy Metal: The Music and its Culture. Da Capo. ISBN 0-306-80970-2.
