= Confessor (band) =

American doom metal band

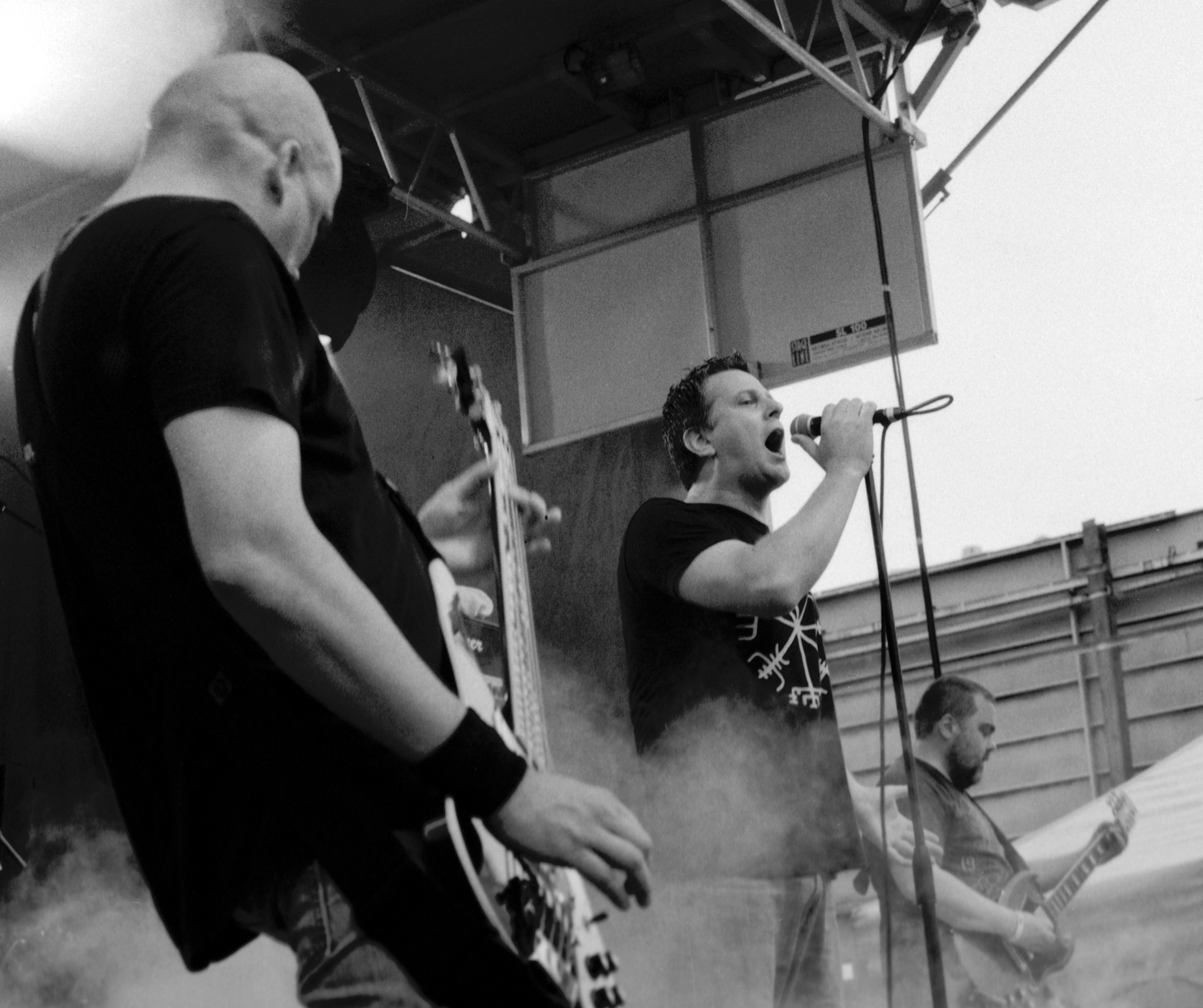
- Confessor playing in Baltimore at Maryland Deathfest 2012.

Background information
- Origin: Raleigh, North Carolina, U.S.
- Genres: Doom metal, progressive metal, progressive doom metal
- Years active: 1986–1994, 2002–present
- Labels: Combat, Earache, Season of Mist
- Members: Scott Jeffreys; Chris Nolan; Marcus Williams; Steve Shelton; Cary Rowells
- Past members: Shawn McCoy; Ivan Colon; Graham Fry; Jim Shoaf; Brian Shoaf
- Website: confessorofficial.com

Confessor is an American heavy metal band from Raleigh, North Carolina. Due to their technically complex interpretation of this style, they are also a well-known name within progressive metal circles. To date, the band has released two full-length studio albums.

The music press referred to Confessor as "the Next Metallica" at one point, according to Decibel. Although lineup difficulties and other issues prevented the band from achieving commercial success, their influence has been observed in the music of Meshuggah and Lamb of God. MetalSucks wrote in 2023: "Confessor isn’t for everyone, but for those who’ve come to appreciate that incredible amount of originality the band brought to the 90’s extreme metal scene, finding a rare kindred spirit likely results in a couple of beers together."

== History ==
The band released their debut album Condemned in 1991. The band toured Europe with Nocturnus. Following this, they embarked on the Gods Of Grind tour with Carcass, Cathedral, and Entombed. Confessor disbanded during the planning stage of their second album in 1994, but reformed in 2002 and are still active today.

== Musical style and influences ==
Eduardo Rivadavia of AllMusic described their style as "slow, dirgy doom metal". The band and were considered stylistic outliers on the roster for Earache Records, which was largely dominated by death metal and grindcore. MetalSucks described the sound as a "mix of doom, jazz, prog and tech". The band's style is considered to be ahead of its time. The heavy metal drumming of Steve Shelton is the focal point of the band's sound, employing complex patterns while the guitars play more simplistic parts. Condemned contains elements of power metal and sludge metal, drawing comparisons to Soundgarden and Meshuggah "at half the speed and with a completely different vocal approach", according to Bradley Torreano of AllMusic. Torreano stated that the album contained "some of the most unusual heavy metal ever crafted," and that "there are no hooks, no harmonies, no choruses, nor even verses. Instead, this is the sound of a technically sound metal band chugging away at riffs and throwing in bizarre guitar solos with a complex, almost mathematical structure holding it together."

The heavy metal singing style of frontman Scott Jeffreys employs a vocal range spanning only a few notes throughout the entirety of the album. Greg Pratt of Decibel stated that metalheads bought the album believing it was a death metal release due to its publication on Earache: "To our confused ears, it sounded more like Axl Rose fronting Trouble playing backwards at 45 RPM." Jefferys himself told Pratt in 2005: "The lack of melody in the music made me feel like I had to scream over it. The old material, where there’s not a melodic guitar part, and it’s just numbers, what are you going to do over that?" The vocalist stated that he was drawing influence from acts such as King Diamond and Fates Warning during this time. The album's themes include self-hatred, such as on the song "Stain".

== Members ==
Current members

- Scott Jeffreys – vocals (1986–1994, 2002–2009, 2011–present)
- Chris Nolan – guitar (1994, 2006–present)
- Marcus Williams – guitar (2013–present)
- Cary Rowells – bass (1986–1994, 2002–present)
- Steve Shelton – drums (1987–1994, 2002–present)

Former members

- Shawn McCoy – guitar (2002–2006)
- Ivan Colon – guitar (1990–1994; died 2002)
- Graham Fry – guitar (1986–1990)
- Jim Shoaf – drums (1986–1987)
- Brian Shoaf – guitar (1986–1994, 2002–2013)

Timeline

== Selected discography ==
Release	Title	Type	Label
1987	The Secret	Demo	Self-produced
1989	Uncontrolled	Demo	Self-produced
1990	Collapse	Demo	Self-produced
1991	Condemned	Full-length	Earache
1992	Confessor	EP	Earache
2004	Blueprint Soul	EP	Independent
2005	Unraveled	Full-length	Season of Mist
2012	Uncontrolled	Compilation	Season of Mist
