= Heavy metal guitar =

Style of guitar playing

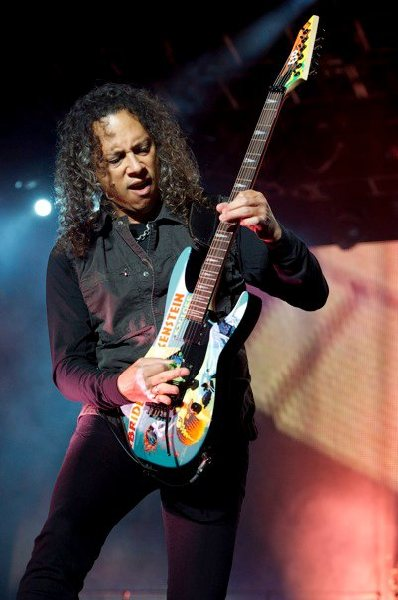
Kirk Hammett performing in 2010

Heavy metal guitar (or simply metal guitar) is the use of highly-amplified electric guitar in heavy metal. Heavy metal guitar playing is rooted in the guitar playing styles developed in 1960s-era blues rock and psychedelic rock, and folk harmonic traditions and it uses a massive sound, characterized by highly amplified distortion, extended guitar solos and overall loudness. The electric guitar and the sonic power that it projects through amplification has historically been the key element in heavy metal. The heavy metal guitar sound comes from a combined use of high volumes and heavy distortion.

Heavy metal bands often have two electric guitarists, with one guitarist playing rhythm guitar and one guitarist playing lead guitar. The rhythm guitar player is part of the rhythm section of the band, along with the bass guitarist and the drummer. The lead guitarist plays guitar solos, instrumental melody lines and melodic fill passages. In power trios, which consist of a guitarist, bassist and drummer, with one or more members singing lead vocals, the single guitarist will switch between rhythm guitar and lead guitar roles as needed.

== Rhythm guitar ==
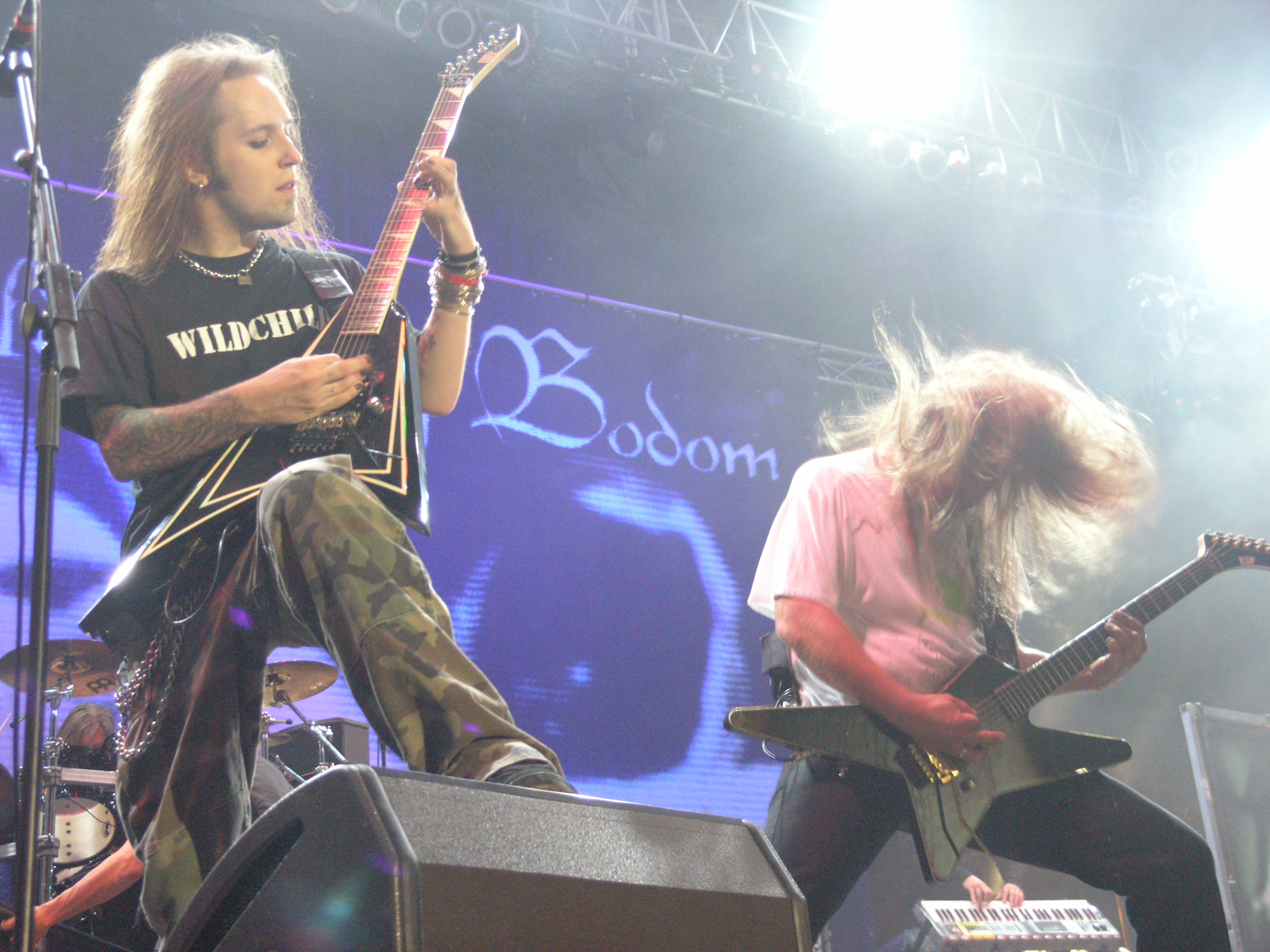
The guitarists from Children of Bodom, performing at the 2007 Masters of Rock festival

The rhythm guitar player is part of the rhythm section of the band, along with the bass guitarist and drummer (and in some bands, a keyboard player). The rhythm guitarist typically plays power chords and riffs using an electric guitar that is plugged into a guitar amplifier, with either the amplifier and/or a distortion effect pedal creating a thick, heavy, distorted sound. The rhythm guitar player plays chords and riffs that create, along with the bass and drums, the rhythmic sound of a metal song. The rhythm guitar also plays the chord progression of a song, along with the bass player (and, if the band has one, the keyboard player).

In 1966, the British company Marshall Amplification began producing the Marshall 1963, a guitar amplifier capable of producing the distorted "crunch" that rock musicians were starting to seek. With rhythm guitar parts, the "heavy crunch sound in heavy metal...[is created by] palm muting" the strings with the picking hand and using distortion. Palm muting creates a tighter, more precise sound and it emphasizes the low end.

Some rhythm guitarists sing lead vocals or backup vocals simultaneously as they play guitar.

== Lead guitar ==
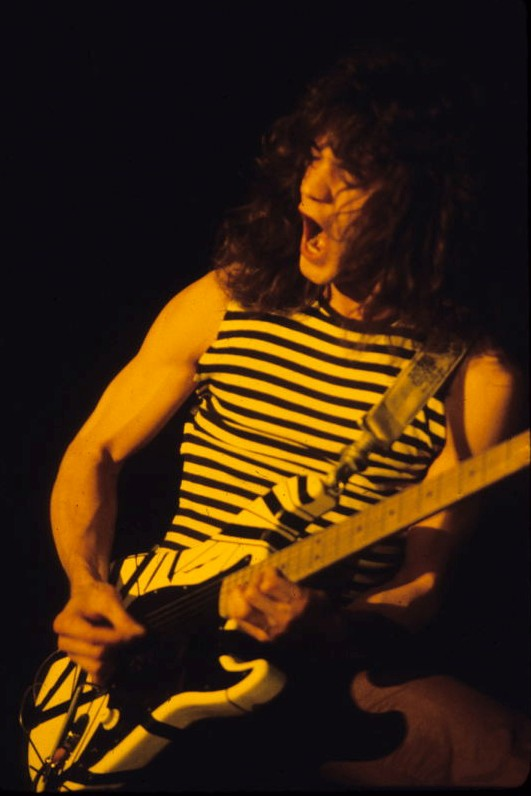
Eddie Van Halen soloing in 1977

The lead guitarist plays guitar solos, instrumental melody lines and melodic fill passages. Guitar solos are "...an essential element of the heavy metal code ... that underscores the significance of the guitar" to the genre. Most heavy metal songs "... featur[e] at least one guitar solo", which is "... a primary means through which the heavy metal performer expresses virtuosity". One exception is nu metal bands, which tend to omit guitar solos.

Shred guitar or "shredding" is a virtuoso lead guitar solo playing style for the electric guitar that is used in a number of metal genres. Shredding uses a range of fast playing techniques, such as "sweep-picked arpeggios, diminished and harmonic minor scales, finger-tapping, fast scale and arpeggio runs and special effects such as tremolo bar "dive bombs". Metal guitarists playing in a "shred" style use the electric guitar with a guitar amplifier and a range of electronic effects such as distortion, which create a more sustained guitar tone and facilitate guitar feedback effects.

In 1978, a "heretofore unknown guitarist named Eddie Van Halen" from Los Angeles released "'Eruption', a blistering aural assault of solo electric guitar" which featured rapid "tapping", which "had rarely been heard in a rock context before". Chris Yancik argues that it is this "record, above any other, that spawned the genre of Shred".

Some lead guitarists sing lead vocals or backup vocals when they are not playing guitar solos.

=== Equipment ===
Dive bomb effect
Dive bomb effect, a typical deep pitch bend using a whammy bar; followed by string noise.

Shred guitar players often use electric solid-body guitars such as Ibanez, Gibson, Fender, Kramer, Kiesel/Carvin, Jackson, Charvel, Schecter and ESP. Some shred guitarists use elaborately shaped models by B.C. Rich or Dean, as well as modern versions of classic-radical designs like Gibson's Flying V and Explorer models. Tremolo bars (also known as "whammy bars"), which are hinged bridges that can be bent down or up in pitch, are an important part of shred playing, as they permit the "dive bombing" effect and many sounds which are not possible with a fixed-bridge instrument.

Guitars with double-cutaways give performers easier access to the higher frets. Many guitar makers are now making a "scalloped cutaway" which was popularized by Irron R. Collins IV. This removes material on the backside of the "horn" allowing extended room for the fretting hand to get extended reach onto the higher notes of the fretboard. Some shred guitarists, such as Scorpions' Ulrich Roth, have used custom-made tremolo bars and developed modified instruments, such as Roth's "Sky Guitar, that would greatly expand his instrumental range, enabling him to reach notes previously reserved in the string world for cellos and violins."

Some shred guitar players use seven or eight string guitars to allow a greater range of notes, such as Steve Vai. Most shred guitar players use a range of effects such as distortion and audio compression units, both of which increase sustain and facilitate the performance of shred techniques such as tapping, hammer-ons, and pull-offs. These and other effects units, such as delay effects are also used to create a unique tone. Shred-style guitarists often use high-gain vacuum tube amplifiers such as Marshall, Carvin, Peavey, Mesa Boogie, ENGL, Laney, Hughes & Kettner and Randall. To facilitate the use of audio feedback effects with the guitar, shred guitarists use high gain settings, distortion pedals and high on-stage volume.

== Loudness ==
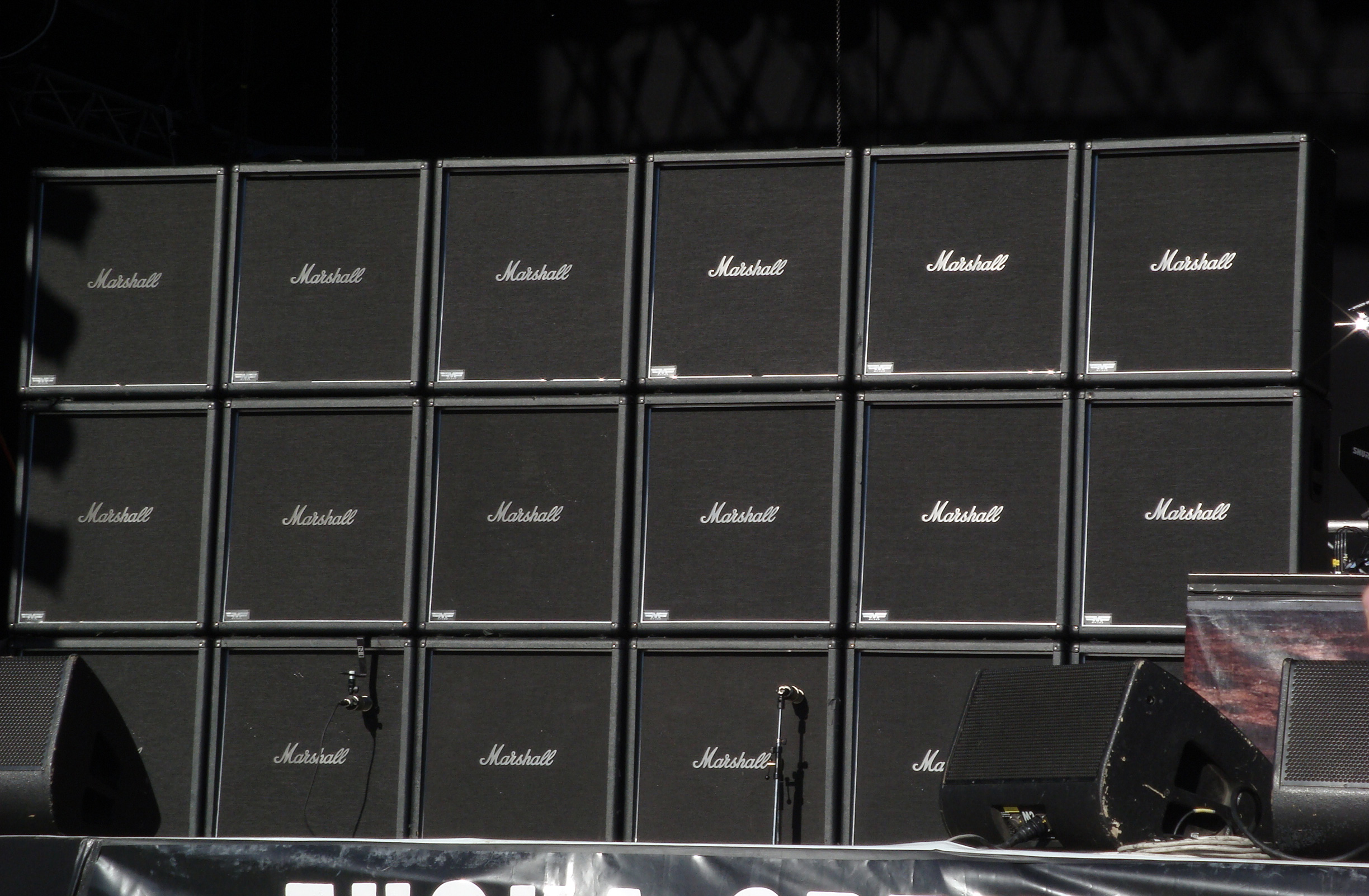
A 3×6 stack of Marshall guitar cabinets for Jeff Hanneman of Slayer

Electric guitarists in metal use large, powerful guitar amplifiers, typically with multiple large speaker cabinets. Some metal guitarists use 18 or more speaker cabinets, with each cabinet containing four 10" speakers. Following the lead set by Jimi Hendrix, Cream and The Who, early heavy metal acts such as Blue Cheer set new benchmarks for volume. As Blue Cheer's Dick Peterson put it, "All we knew was we wanted more power." A 1977 review of a Motörhead concert noted how "excessive volume in particular figured into the band's impact". Weinstein states that powerful sound, timbre, and volume are the key elements of metal. She argues that the loudness is designed to "sweep the listener into the sound" and to provide a "shot of youthful vitality".

== Role of women ==
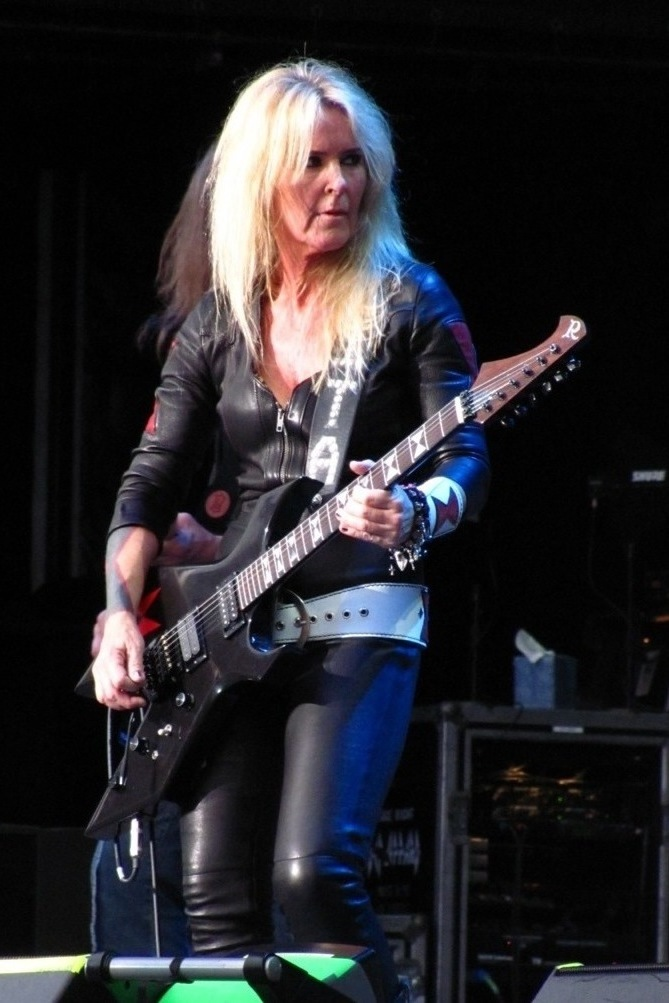
Lita Ford playing guitar in 2012

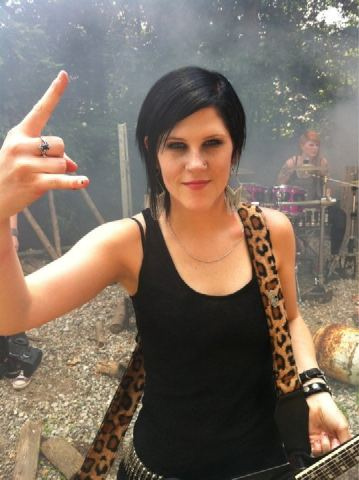
Morgan Lander, the guitarist of Kittie

In relation to the gender composition of heavy metal bands, it has been said that "[h]eavy metal performers are almost exclusively male" "...[a]t least until the mid-1980s" apart from "... exceptions such as Girlschool". However, "...now [in the 2010s] maybe more than ever–strong metal women have put up their dukes and got down to it","carv[ing] out a considerable place for [them]selves". Given that most heavy metal musicians are male, most metal guitarists are male. Almost all of the most well-known metal guitarists in major bands are male.

Women have less roles in rock music genres like metal because the "... rebellion of rock music was largely a male rebellion". Philip Auslander says that "Although there were many women in rock by the late 1960s, most performed only as singers, a traditionally feminine position in popular music". Though some women played instruments in American all-female garage rock bands, none of these bands achieved more than regional success. So they "did not provide viable templates for women's on-going participation in rock".

Notable women metal guitarists include Jo Bench, Lita Ford, The Great Kat, and Morgan Lander.

== See also ==
- Heavy metal singing
- Heavy metal bass
- Heavy metal drumming
- Heavy metal lyrics

== Works cited ==
- Fast, Susan (2001). In the Houses of the Holy: Led Zeppelin and the Power of Rock Music. Oxford University Press. ISBN 0-19-511756-5.
- Fast, Susan (2005). "Led Zeppelin and the Construction of Masculinity", in Music Cultures in the United States, ed. Ellen Koskoff. Routledge. ISBN 0-415-96588-8.
- Walser, Robert (1993). Running with the Devil: Power, Gender, and Madness in Heavy Metal Music. Wesleyan University Press. ISBN 0-8195-6260-2.
- Waksman, Steve (2009). This Ain't The Summer of Love: Conflict and Crossover in Heavy Metal and Punk. University of California Press. ISBN 0-520-25310-8.
- Weinstein, Deena (1991). Heavy Metal: A Cultural Sociology. Lexington. ISBN 0-669-21837-5. Revised edition: (2000). Heavy Metal: The Music and its Culture. Da Capo. ISBN 0-306-80970-2.
