= Screaming in music =

Vocal technique used in music

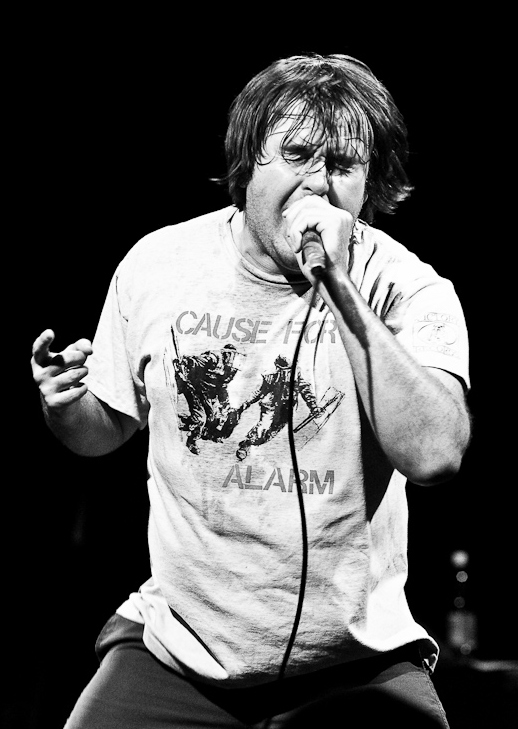
Barney Greenway performing with grindcore band Napalm Death

Screaming is an extended vocal technique that is usually harsh, loud and aggressive. While a few other music genres have used screaming, it is especially popular in hardcore punk and extreme metal. Proper technique is required to scream safely, and some vocalists experience health issues due to improper screaming.

== Overview ==
=== Blues ===
One of the first known R&B songs to utilize screaming vocals is Screamin' Jay Hawkins' "I Put a Spell on You" (1956). Commenting on Tina Turner's "A Fool in Love" (1960), Juggy Murray said, "All of those blues singers sounded like dirt. Tina sounded like screaming dirt. It was a funky sound."

=== Heavy metal ===
While occasional screaming has been used for effect in heavy metal since the genre's dawn in the late 1960s, with singers such as Robert Plant, Ian Gillan and Rob Halford employing the technique frequently, screaming as a normal method of lyrical delivery first came to prominence in heavy metal as part of the thrash metal movement of the 1980s. Thrash metal was influenced both by heavy metal and by hardcore punk, the latter of which often incorporated shouted vocals. Musicologist Robert Walser noted, "The punk influence shows up in the music's fast tempos and frenetic aggressiveness and in critical or sarcastic lyrics delivered in a menacing growl."

Death metal in particular is associated with growled vocals. It tends to be darker and more morbid than thrash metal, and features vocals that attempt to evoke chaos and misery by being "usually very deep, guttural, and unintelligible." Natalie Purcell notes, "Although the vast majority of death metal bands use very low, beast-like, almost indiscernible growls as vocals, many also have high and screechy or operatic vocals, or simply deep and forcefully sung vocals." Music sociologist Deena Weinstein noted of death metal, "Vocalists in this style have a distinctive sound, growling and snarling rather than singing the words. Making ample use of the voice distortion box, they sound as if they had gargled with hydrochloric acid."

Ian Christe noted a progressively more forceful enunciation of metal vocals, from heavy metal to thrash metal to death metal:

To appreciate the music, fans first had to accept a merciless sonic signature: guttural vocals that were little more than a menacing, sub-audible growl. James Hetfield's thrash metal rasp was harsh in contrast to Rob Halford's heavy metal high notes, but creatures like Glen Benton of Deicide tore out their larynxes to summon images of decaying corpses and giant catastrophic horrors.

A particular style known as "pig squealing" has been used by deathcore bands such as Job for a Cowboy and Despised Icon.

=== Hardcore and punk rock ===
Yelling and shouting vocals are common in a type of punk rock known as hardcore. Early punk was distinguished by a general tendency to eschew traditional singing techniques in favor of a more direct, harsh style which accentuated meaning rather than beauty. The logical extension of this aesthetic is shouting, and in hardcore punk, vocals are usually shouted in a frenetic manner similar to rapping or football chants, often accompanied by "gang vocals" in which a group of people shout along with the vocalist. This style is very common in punk rock, most prominently Oi!, street punk and hardcore punk. An off-shoot of emotional hardcore defined by screamed vocals is screamo. A common misconception is that any type of music containing screamed vocals is screamo. This misconception became particularly widespread during the early 2000s, when the term was frequently applied to emo, post-hardcore, metalcore, and other alternative bands that incorporated screamed vocals.

== Health concerns ==
Some vocalists who employed improper screaming techniques have had problems with their throats, voices, and vocal cords. Some vocalists have had to stop screaming, making music altogether, or even undergo surgery due to damage to their vocal cords. One example is former lead singer of From First to Last Sonny Moore, who had to leave the band as vocalist due to the damage it was causing to his vocal cords, which required surgery to repair. Kyo of Dir En Grey, noted for his extreme vocal range incorporating both clean and harsh vocals, was hospitalised for vocal nodule dysphonia in 2012, though has since recovered. Vocalist Mark Garrett of Kardashev told Science Friday that vocalists who scream can have difficulties with healthcare, as doctors simply tell them to stop rather than giving them exams. Vocal coach Melissa Cross is known for training vocalists in safe screaming techniques, sometimes at the request of record labels whose talents are having vocal problems.

In 2024, the University of Utah studied the screaming technique of Will Ramos of Lorna Shore, with The Charismatic Voice posting a video of the process. They found that his technique, which he described as false cord, manipulated tissues above the vocal cords, protecting them from damage and producing less strain than even regular speech. They noted that such technique could be taught to other screamers, allowing them to maintain their health and careers, and that they had plans to study other screamers. Such supraglottal tissues of the larynx move minimally in clean singing, but more extensively in Tibetan chants and Tuvan throat singing. Elizabeth Zharoff of The Charismatic Voice recruited eight other vocalists and launched a Kickstarter campaign for a larger study which raised over $300,000. In March of 2025, four of those vocalists (Mark Garrett of Kardashev, Travis Ryan of Cattle Decapitation, Spencer Sotelo of Periphery, and Alissa White-Gluz of Arch Enemy) completed similar tests; Phil Bozeman of Whitechapel, Melissa Bonny of Ad Infinitum, Tatiana Shmayluk of Jinjer, and Devin Townsend were also set to undergo testing.

== See also ==
- List of songs with screaming vocals before 1960
- Death growl
- Screaming
- Heavy metal singing
- Screamo
- Harsh voice
- Creaky voice
- Ingressive sound
- Pharyngealization
- Epiglottal trill
