= Heavy metal drumming =

Style of playing the drums

Heavy metal drumming is a style of rock music drum kit playing that developed in the late 1960s and early 1970s, largely in the United States and the United Kingdom. With roots in blues rock and psychedelic/acid rock drum playing, heavy metal drummers play with emphatic beats, and overall loudness using an aggressive performing style. Heavy metal (or "metal") drumming is traditionally characterized by emphatic rhythms and dense bass guitar-and-drum sound.

A characteristic metal drumming technique is the cymbal choke, which consists of striking a cymbal and then immediately silencing it by grabbing it with the other hand (or, in some cases, the same striking hand), producing a burst of sound. The metal drum setup is generally much larger than those employed in other forms of rock music. Black metal, death metal and some "mainstream metal" bands "all depend upon double-kicks and blast beats".

== Rhythm and tempo ==
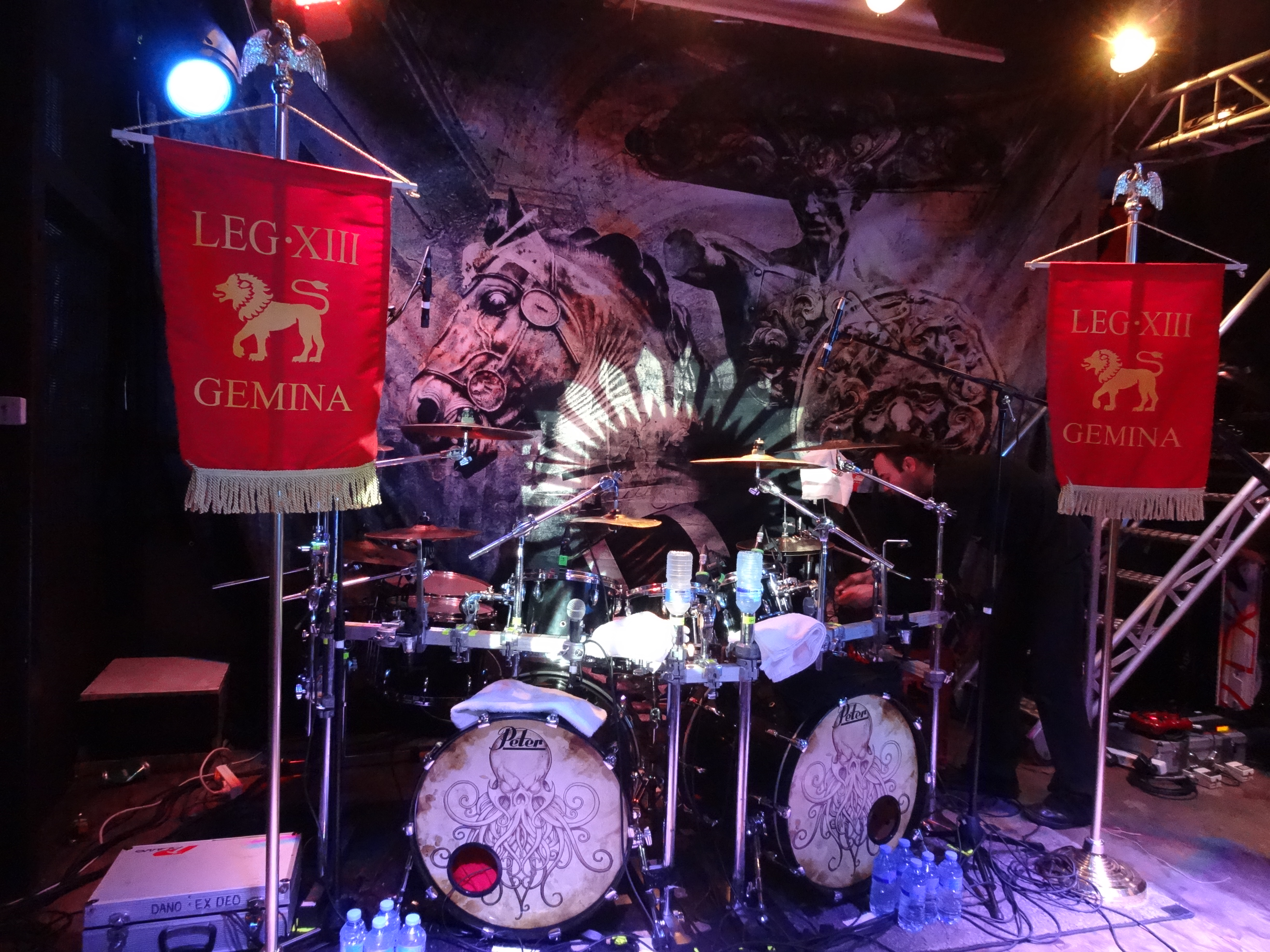
A large metal drum kit with two bass drums.

The rhythm in metal songs is emphatic, with deliberate stresses on beats by the drummer and other rhythm section players. Weinstein observes that the wide array of sonic effects available to metal drummers enables the "rhythmic pattern to take on a complexity within its elemental drive and insistency". In many heavy metal songs, the main groove is characterized by short, two-note or three-note rhythmic figures—generally made up of 8th or 16th notes.

Brief, abrupt, and detached rhythmic cells are joined into rhythmic phrases with a distinctive, often jerky texture. Heavy metal songs also use longer rhythmic figures such as whole note- or dotted quarter note-length chords in slow-tempo power ballads. The tempos in early heavy metal music tended to be "slow, even ponderous". By the late 1970s, however, metal bands were employing a wide variety of tempos. In the 2000s decade, metal tempos range from slow ballad tempos (quarter note = 60 beats per minute) to extremely fast blast beat tempos (quarter note = 350 beats per minute).

== Components ==
Like drummers from other rock music genres, metal drummers use a drum kit, a collection of drums and other percussion instruments, typically cymbals, which are set up on stands to be played by a single player with drumsticks held in both hands and the feet operating pedals that control the hi-hat cymbal and the beater for the bass drum. Many metal drummers extend their kits from the basic "snare drum, bass drum, toms and cymbals" pattern, adding more drums, more cymbals, and many other instruments. In some styles of music particular extensions are normal, such as double bass drums in heavy metal music.

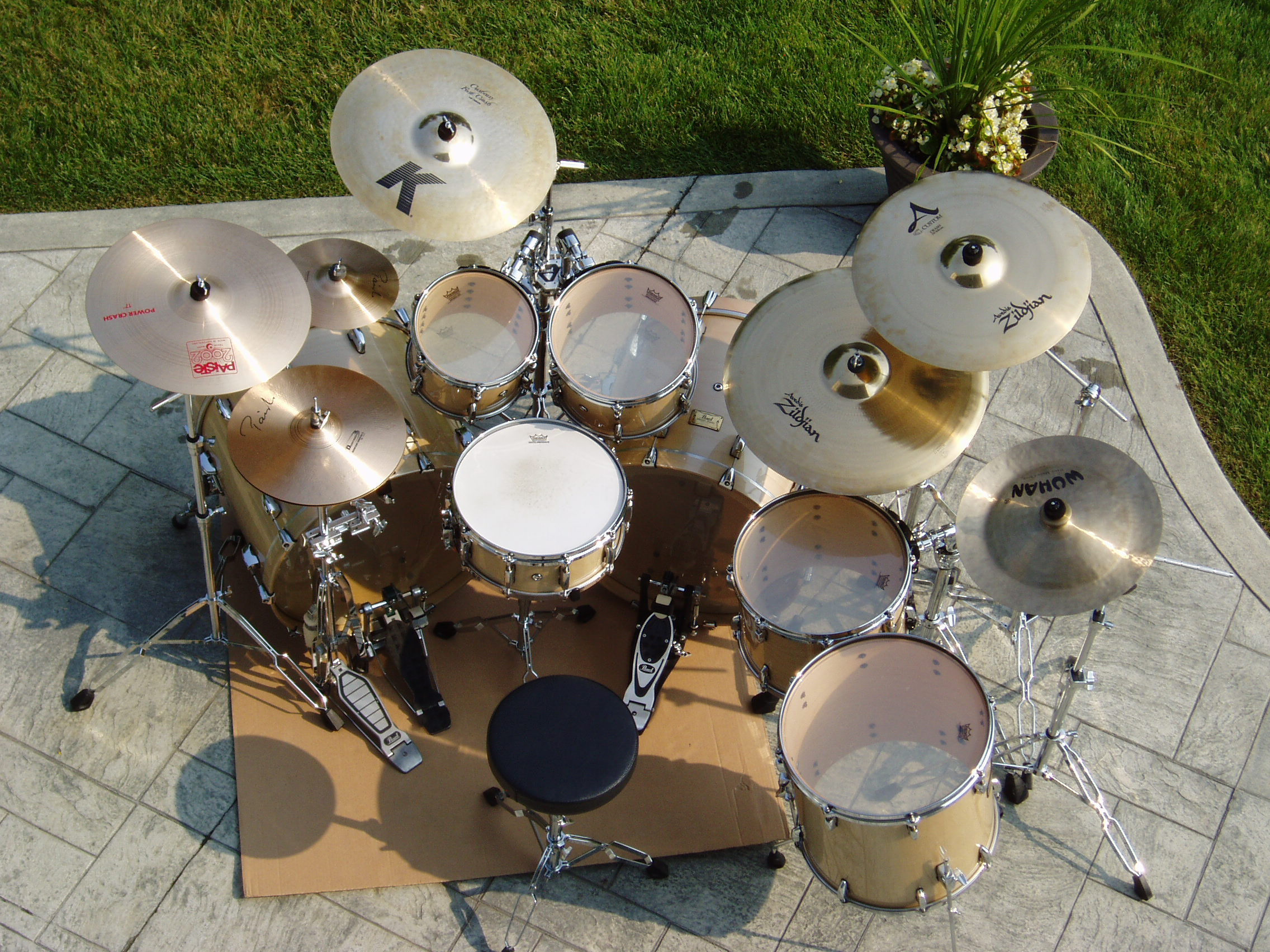
A seven-piece kit with snare, double bass drums, two hanging toms, two-floor toms, hi-hats, ride cymbal, three crash cymbals, splash cymbal and china type

Common extensions beyond these standard configurations include:

- Effects cymbals, particularly splash cymbals and china cymbals
- Double bass drums. Double bass drums or a double bass pedal are standard for some genres, particularly in heavy metal music
- Extra hanging or rack toms
- Extra crash cymbals
- A crash/ride cymbal in addition to the main ride
- A second, larger or smaller floor tom
- One or more octobans or a pair of mini timbales
- A second pair of hi-hats mounted as cable hats or x-hats
- Cymbal stacks
- Individual tiger, wind or chau gongs
- Multiple ride cymbals. A sizzle cymbal, thinner and larger than the main ride, was once common as a second ride or crash/ride, even in a four-piece kit, but is now less so (jazz drummers, however, may still have two or more ride cymbals, even in a small kit)

Less common extensions found particularly, but not exclusive to very large kits, include:

- Multiple snare drums
- Multiple bass drums beyond the double bass drum setup

=== Microphones ===
While some quieter, acoustic genres of music, such as jazz and traditional blues may not use microphones ("mics", pronounced "mikes") in club gigs, in metal, the very loud stage volume from the huge guitar speaker stacks and powerful bass amplifiers means that drums are usually miked. In "miking" a drum kit in metal, dynamic microphones, which can handle high sound-pressure levels, are usually used to close-mic drums, which is the predominant way to mic drums for live shows. Condenser microphones are used for overheads and room mics, an approach which is more common with sound recording applications. Close miking of drums may be done using stands or by mounting the microphones on the rims of the drums, or even using microphones built into the drum itself, which eliminates the need for stands for these microphones, reducing both clutter and set-up time, as well as isolating them.

In metal, drummers use noise gates that mute the attached microphone when the signal is below a threshold volume. This allows the sound engineer to use a higher overall volume for the drum kit by reducing the number of "active" mics which could produce unwanted feedback at any one time. When a drumkit is entirely miked and amplified through the sound reinforcement system, the drummer or the sound engineer can add other electronic effects to the drum sound, such as reverb or digital delay.

== Playing ==
=== Grooves ===
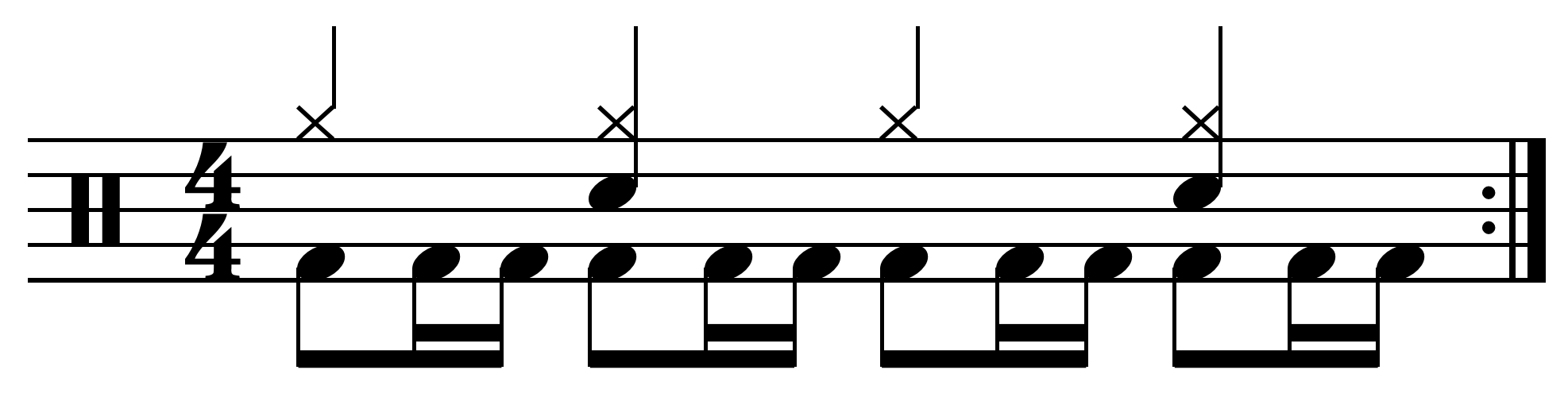
The heavy metal gallop, an important drum beat.

Metal drumming, whether playing accompaniment of singers or guitar solos and other instruments or doing a drum solo, consists of two elements:

- A groove which sets the basic timefeel and provides a rhythmic framework for the song (examples include a back beat or shuffle).
- Drum fills and other ornaments and variations which provide variety and add interest to the drum sound. Fills could include a sting at the end of a musical section or act as a drum showpiece.

=== Fills ===
A fill is a departure from the repetitive rhythm pattern in a song. A drum fill is used to "fill in" the space between the end of one verse and the beginning of another verse or chorus. Fills vary from a simple few strokes on a tom or snare, to a distinctive rhythm played on the hi-hat, to sequences several bars long that are short virtuosic drum solos. As well as adding interest and variation to the music, fills serve an important function in preparing and indicating significant changes of sections in songs and linking sections. A vocal cue is a short drum fill that introduces a vocal entry. A fill ending with a cymbal crash on beat one is often used to lead into a chorus or verse.

=== Drum solos ===
A drum solo is an instrumental section that highlights the virtuosity, skill and musical creativity of the drummer. While other instrument solos such as guitar solos are typically accompanied by the other rhythm section instruments (e.g., bass guitar and electric guitar), for most drum solos, all the other band members stop playing so that all of the audience's focus will be on the drummer. In some drum solos, the other rhythm section instrumentalists may play "punches" at certain points–sudden, loud chords of a short duration. Drum solos are common in heavy metal. During drum solos, drummers have a great deal of creative freedom, and drummers often use the entire drum kit. In live concerts, drummers may be given long drum solos, even in genres where drum solos are rare on singles.

== Subgenres ==
Where the blues rock drumming style started out largely as simple shuffle beats on small kits, drummers began using a more muscular, complex, and amplified approach to match and be heard against the increasingly loud guitar.

=== Thrash metal ===
Thrash metal emerged in the early 1980s under the influence of hardcore punk and the new wave of British heavy metal, particularly songs in the revved-up style known as speed metal. The movement began in the United States, with Bay Area thrash metal being the leading scene. The drumming sound developed by thrash groups was faster and more aggressive than that of the original metal bands and their glam metal successors.

=== Death metal ===
Thrash soon began to evolve and split into more extreme metal genres. Death metal uses the speed and aggression of both thrash and hardcore. Death metal uses extremely fast drumming, often with rapid double bass drumming and "wall of sound"–style blast beats. Frequent tempo and time signature changes and syncopation are also typical.

=== Black metal ===
The first wave of black metal emerged in Europe in the early and mid-1980s and used blast beats and skank beats.

=== Doom metal ===
Emerging in the mid-1980s, the doom metal movement rejected other metal styles' emphasis on speed, slowing its music to a crawl and using melancholy tempos.

=== 1990s and early 2000s subgenres and fusions ===
In the mid- and late 1990s came a new wave of U.S. metal groups inspired by the alternative metal bands and their mix of genres. Dubbed "nu metal", bands such as Slipknot, Linkin Park, Limp Bizkit, Papa Roach, P.O.D., Korn and Disturbed incorporated elements ranging from death metal to hip hop beats. Nu metal gained mainstream success through heavy MTV rotation and Ozzy Osbourne's 1996 introduction of Ozzfest, which led the media to talk of a resurgence of heavy metal.

== See also ==
- Heavy metal genres
- List of heavy metal bands
- Heavy metal singing
- Heavy metal bass
- Heavy metal guitar
- Heavy metal lyrics
