= I Put a Spell on You =

1956 single by Screamin' Jay Hawkins

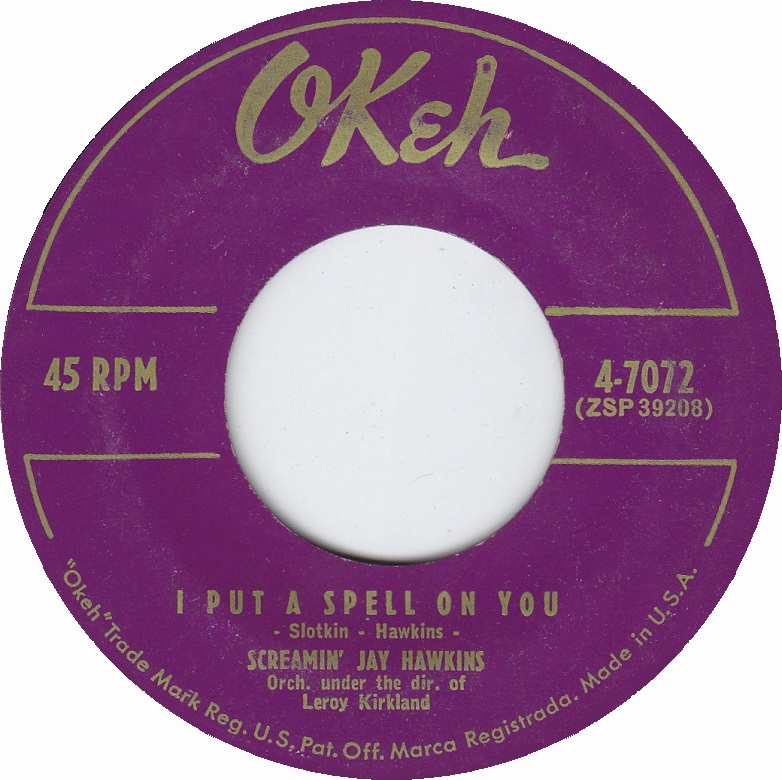
- A-side label of the 1956 U.S. 7-inch vinyl single

Single by Screamin' Jay Hawkins

from the album At Home with Screamin' Jay Hawkins
- B-side: "Little Demon"
- Released: October 1956
- Recorded: September 12, 1956
- Genre: Rhythm and blues; rock and roll; shock rock
- Length: 2:25
- Label: Okeh
- Songwriters: Jay Hawkins; Herb Slotkin
- Producer: Arnold Maxin

Screamin' Jay Hawkins singles chronology
"Even Though" (1956)	"I Put a Spell on You" (1956)	"You Made Me Love You" (1957)

Audio video
- "I Put a Spell on You" on YouTube

"I Put a Spell on You" is a 1956 song recorded by "Screamin' Jay" Hawkins and co-written with Herb Slotkin. The selection became a classic cult song, covered by a variety of artists. It was Hawkins's greatest commercial success, reportedly surpassing a million copies in sales, even though it failed to make the Billboard pop or R&B charts.

Hawkins's recording of it was selected as one of the Rock and Roll Hall of Fame's 500 Songs that Shaped Rock and Roll. It was also included in Robert Christgau's "Basic Record Library" of 1950s and 1960s recordings—published in Christgau's Record Guide: Rock Albums of the Seventies (1981)—and ranked No. 313 on Rolling Stone magazine's list of The 500 Greatest Songs of All Time.

== Background ==
"I Put a Spell on You"
"I Put a Spell on You" is an early example of screaming in music.

Hawkins had originally intended to record "I Put a Spell on You" as "a refined love song, a blues ballad". However, the producer Arnold Maxin "brought in ribs and chicken and got everybody drunk, and we came out with this weird version ... I don't even remember making the record. Before, I was just a normal blues singer. I was just Jay Hawkins. It all sort of just fell in place. I found out I could do more destroying a song and screaming it to death." His first wife Anna Mae Vernon later claimed that she wrote the song and let him take the credit.

Hawkins first recorded "I Put a Spell on You" as a ballad during his stint with Grand Records in late 1955. However, that version was not released at the time (it has since been reissued on Hawkins's UK Rev-Ola CD The Whamee 1953–55). The following year, Hawkins re-recorded the song for Columbia's Okeh Records—the notorious screaming version, which was released in October 1956. However, this version was banned from most radio programming for its outrageous "cannibalistic" style. A truncated version was later released omitting the grunts and moans from the ending of the song, but the ban generally remained. Despite the restriction, the record still sold over a million copies.

The hit brought Hawkins together with Cleveland disc jockey Alan Freed who promptly added him to his "Rock and Roll Revue". Up to this time, Hawkins had been a blues performer; emotional, but not wild. Freed suggested a gimmick to capitalize on the "demented" sound of "I Put a Spell on You": Hawkins wore a long cape, and appeared onstage by rising out of a coffin in the midst of smoke and fog. The act was a sensation, later bolstered by tusks worn in Hawkins's nose, on-stage snakes and fireworks, a cigarette-smoking skull named "Henry" and, ultimately, Hawkins transforming himself into "the black Vincent Price". This theatrical act was one of the first shock rock performances.

== Personnel ==
- Vocals – Jalacy Hawkins
- Guitar – Mickey Baker
- Piano – Ernie Hayes
- Tenor saxophone – Sam "The Man" Taylor
- Baritone saxophone – Bud Johnson
- Bass – Al Lucas
- Drums – David "Panama" Francis
- Arrangement – Leroy Kirkland

== Nina Simone version ==
Nina Simone's version, from her album of the same name, reached No. 120 Pop and No. 23 on the U.S. Billboard R&B chart in 1965; it also reached No. 49 on the UK singles chart that year, and No. 28 when it was reissued in 1969.

=== Certifications ===
Region	Certification	Certified units/sales
New Zealand (RMNZ)	Gold	15,000^{‡}
^{‡} Sales+streaming figures based on certification alone.

== Alan Price version ==
"I Put a Spell on You"
- Belgian single sleeve

Single by Alan Price Set
- B-side: "Iechyd-Da"
- Released: 18 March 1966
- Recorded: January 1–2, 1966
- Studio: Kingsway, London
- Genre: R&B; jazz rock
- Length: 3:20
- Label: Decca
- Songwriter: Hawkins
- Producers: Alan Price; Mike Jeffery

Alan Price Set singles chronology
"Any Day Now (My Wild Beautiful Bird)" (1965)	"I Put a Spell on You" (1966)	"Hi-Lili, Hi-Lo" (1966)

Audio video
- "I Put a Spell on You" on YouTube

=== Background and recording ===
In May 1965, shortly after the release of their single "Bring It On Home to Me", keyboardist Alan Price left pop group the Animals. The reason for his departure from the group has been debated; though some sources claim it was a fear of flying stemming from their American tours, others claim it was a feud between lead singer Eric Burdon and Price regarding royalties over their 1964 single "The House of the Rising Sun", which solely credited Price as an arranger thus leaving the other members without any payments for the song. Price himself states that he left the day the band embarked on a tour to Sweden. Price then decided on beginning a solo career while the Animals recruited a new keyboardist, initially Mick Gallagher for a short tour before settling on Dave Rowberry.

Price then started putting together a band of his own, which consisted of baritone saxophonist Clive Burrows, tenor saxophonist Steve Gregory, guitarist Peter Kirtley, bassist Rod Slade, drummer Roy Mills along with trumpeter John Walters, whom he had met during his time in the Animals. The band quickly garnered a recording contract with Decca Records and subsequently debuted on record with a cover of Burt Bacharach's "Any Day Now (My Wild Beautiful Bird)" in August 1965. Although this release failed to chart, it "showed great promise".

Price allegedly came to know about "I Put a Spell on You" through vocalist Chris Farlowe, who had a record collection comprising mostly rhythm and blues along with soul music. It is unclear what version of the song he heard for his version but as the Animals were big fans of Nina Simone it is likely Price heard it through her version. It was however part of the group's repertoire for a while before being recorded, which occurred during a rather tense moment of Price's life, as his mother died on New Year's Eve 1965, the day prior to recording it, which according to Price meant that "emotions sort of transmuted themselves onto the record". The recording, which took place at Kingsway Recording Studios in London, was produced by Price together with manager Mike Jeffery. It was, according to Price, "also the cheapest hit record to produce", allegedly costing only £16. It was recorded rather straightforward in one take with the exception of a re-take involving the horn section.

=== Release and reception ===
I was fed up with people looking around for "commercial" sounds for me month after month, and I decided to do "I Put A Spell On You". We'd been doing it on stage for some time and it had been going down well.

— Alan Price (1966)

"I Put a Spell on You" was released through Decca Records on March 18, 1966, in the United Kingdom. It was backed by "Iechyd-Da", an original instrumental composition written by John Walters. It quickly became a large hit, entering the Record Retailer chart on April 6, 1966, at a position of number 38. It peaked at number 9 on April 27, a position it would hold for two weeks before dropping off the chart on June 8 at a position of number 50. It fared similarly well on the other British charts, reaching number 12 in Melody Maker, New Musical Express and Disc. It also reached number 1 on Fab 40. It became a small hit in the United States, reaching number 80 on the Billboard Hot 100 in August of that year.

Upon release, the single garnered generally positive reviews amongst critics. In Record Mirror, Peter Jones and Norman Jopling describe the single as having "sepulchral tones" set to the backing of Price's organ. They also state that the build-up with Price's "moody vocals" "builds well" while ending on the notion that it is his best recording "since leaving the Animals". In a blind date for Melody Maker with Barry Fantoni, the record is described as having vocals similar to Eric Burdon. Beyond Burdon, Fantoni also believes there are traces of Steve Winwood in Price's voice. He states that the "minor progressions are great" and ends on the notion that it "deserves to do well" due to its "big sound" reminiscent of James Brown. Hawkins was apparently not keen on Price's version due to the commercial success it had, as it kept him out of the spotlight. He is alleged to have stated "how could this white boy get credit for this black boy's song?" after watching Price perform it. Additionally, Price was critical of Hawkins's original version of the song, calling it "terrible" compared to Nina Simone's version.

Derek Johnson believes that "I Put a Spell on You" is one of the "finest rhythm and blues discs ever waxed in this country." Retrospectively, the single has also received praise by critics. Richie Unterberger of AllMusic considered it "brilliant", while also comparing it to previous material by the Animals, ending on the notion that it is "bluesy". Unterberger also claims that "I Put a Spell on You" is "his best early performance", "marvellous", while also stating that it was amongst the best British hits not to become big in America. Though never included on an album upon original release, it has later appeared on many albums by Price, the first being This Price Is Right in 1968.

=== Charts ===
Weekly chart performance for "I Put a Spell on You"
Chart (1966)	Peak position
Australia (Kent Music Report)	35
France (IFOP)	31
Netherlands (Dutch Top 40)	11
Netherlands (Single Top 100)	10
New Zealand (Listener)	15
UK (Disc and Music Echo)	12
UK (Melody Maker)	12
UK (New Musical Express)	12
UK (Record Retailer)	9
US Billboard Hot 100	80
US Cashbox Looking Ahead	105
US Record World Upcoming Singles	106

== Creedence Clearwater Revival version ==
"I Put a Spell on You"

Single by Creedence Clearwater Revival

from the album Creedence Clearwater Revival
- B-side: "Walk on the Water"
- Released: October 1968
- Recorded: February 1968
- Genre: Blues rock; swamp rock
- Length: 4:32
- Label: Fantasy Records
- Songwriter: J. Hawkins
- Producer: Saul Zaentz

Creedence Clearwater Revival singles chronology
"Suzie Q" (1968)	"I Put a Spell on You" (1968)	"Proud Mary" (1969)

Music video
- "I Put a Spell on You" on YouTube

In October 1968, Creedence Clearwater Revival released a cover of this song, which was also on their eponymous debut album released in July 1968. The cover fit Fogerty's voice, whose own manic vocal delivery had much in common with Hawkins's powerful singing style. It was released in October 1968 with "Walk on the Water" as the B-side. This version peaked on the U.S. charts at #58. The band performed it at the Woodstock Festival in 1969.

=== Personnel ===
- John Fogerty - lead guitar, lead vocals
- Tom Fogerty - rhythm guitar, backing vocals, lyrics
- Stu Cook - bass guitar
- Doug Clifford - drums

== Annie Lennox version ==
"I Put a Spell on You"

Single by Annie Lennox

from the album Nostalgia
- Released: 15 September 2014
- Recorded: 2013
- Studio: Sheen Lane Studios (London, UK); State of the Ark Studios (London, UK)
- Genre: Soul; jazz
- Length: 3:44
- Label: Island
- Songwriters: Jay Hawkins; Herb Slotkin

Annie Lennox singles chronology
"The Holly and the Ivy" (2011)	"I Put a Spell on You" (2014)	"Summertime" (2014)

Live video
- "I Put a Spell on You" on YouTube

Scottish singer Annie Lennox recorded her own version of the song in 2013, and released it on September 15, 2014, as the lead single from her sixth studio album, Nostalgia. The original release failed to make any impact on charts until it was included on the 2015 film Fifty Shades of Grey. Following its usage in the film, it achieved considerable commercial success internationally, charting within the US Billboard Hot 100, as well as the official singles charts in her native Scotland, Switzerland, Sweden and the United Kingdom. It reached the top forty of the singles charts in both France and Hungary.

=== Weekly charts ===
Weekly chart performance for "I Put a Spell on You"
Chart (2015)	Peak position
Australia (ARIA)	81
Austria (Ö3 Austria Top 40)	60
Canada Hot 100 (Billboard)	80
Czech Republic Singles Digital (ČNS IFPI)	98
France (SNEP)	29
Germany (GfK)	63
Hungary (Single Top 40)	31
Sweden (Sverigetopplistan)	81
Switzerland (Schweizer Hitparade)	44
UK Singles (Official Charts)	63
Scottish Singles Sales (Official Charts)	56
US Billboard Hot 100	97
US Adult Contemporary (Billboard)	20

=== Certifications ===
Region	Certification	Certified units/sales
Brazil (Pro-Música Brasil) Original Version	Gold	20,000^{‡}
Brazil (Pro-Música Brasil) Fifty Shades of Grey	Platinum	60,000^{‡}
New Zealand (RMNZ)	Gold	15,000^{‡}
United Kingdom (BPI)	Silver	200,000^{‡}
^{‡} Sales+streaming figures based on certification alone.

== Other versions ==
"I Put a Spell on You" has been covered by other artists extensively; there are several hundred versions. Most of the covers treat the song seriously; few attempt to duplicate Hawkins's bravura performance. Although Hawkins's own version never charted, several later cover versions have.

- In the UK, Bryan Ferry's version, covered on the album Taxi, reached No. 18 in 1993.
- In the UK, the version by Sonique reached No. 36 in 1998 and No. 8 on reissue in 2000.

The Crazy World of Arthur Brown covered the song on their 1968 self-titled album, reaching No. 111 in the US. Jeff Beck and Joss Stone covered the song on the album Emotion & Commotion in 2010. It was nominated for the Grammy Award for Best Rock Performance by a Duo or Group with Vocal at the 53rd Grammy Awards.

== See also ==
- List of songs with screaming vocals before 1960
