= List of songs with screaming vocals before 1960 =

Prior to the emergence of heavy rock genres, screaming vocals were occasionally used in brief segments of blues, gospel, jazz, popular music, rhythm and blues, and rockabilly songs.

List of pre-1960 songs with screaming vocals
Year	Song	Artist	Genre	Audio (choose one)
1928	"Jesus is Coming Soon"	Blind Willie Johnson	Gospel blues	Play
1929	"He Got Better Things For You"	Memphis Sanctified Singers	Gospel	Play
1931	"You've Got to Save That Thing"	Ora Alexander	Vaudeville blues	Play
1933	"That's How Rhythm Was Born"	The Boswell Sisters	Jazz	Play
1936	"Chasse à l’enfant "	Marianne Oswald	Chanson réaliste	Play
1938	"Der Onkel Jonathan!"	Rosita Serrano	Schlager	Play
1940	"Bounce the Ball"	Louis Jordan & His Tympany Five	Jump blues	Play
1945	"Cachumbambé"	Celia Gámez	Son	Play
1946	"I Got the Sun in the Morning"	Betty Hutton	Show tunes	Play
1952	"Kuyaway (Inca Love Song)"	Yma Sumac	Exotica	Play
1956	"I Put a Spell on You"	Screamin' Jay Hawkins	Rhythm and blues	
Late 1950s	"Fujiyama Mama"	Debbie Lynn	Rockabilly	Play
1959	"Rock ou tango"	P.A.O.L.A	Chanson	Play
