= Death growl =

Vocal style in music

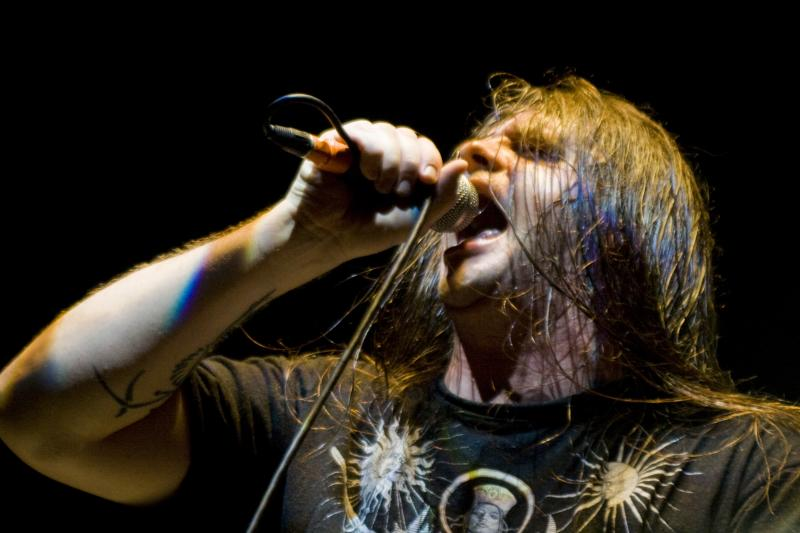
George "Corpsegrinder" Fisher, of American death metal band Cannibal Corpse

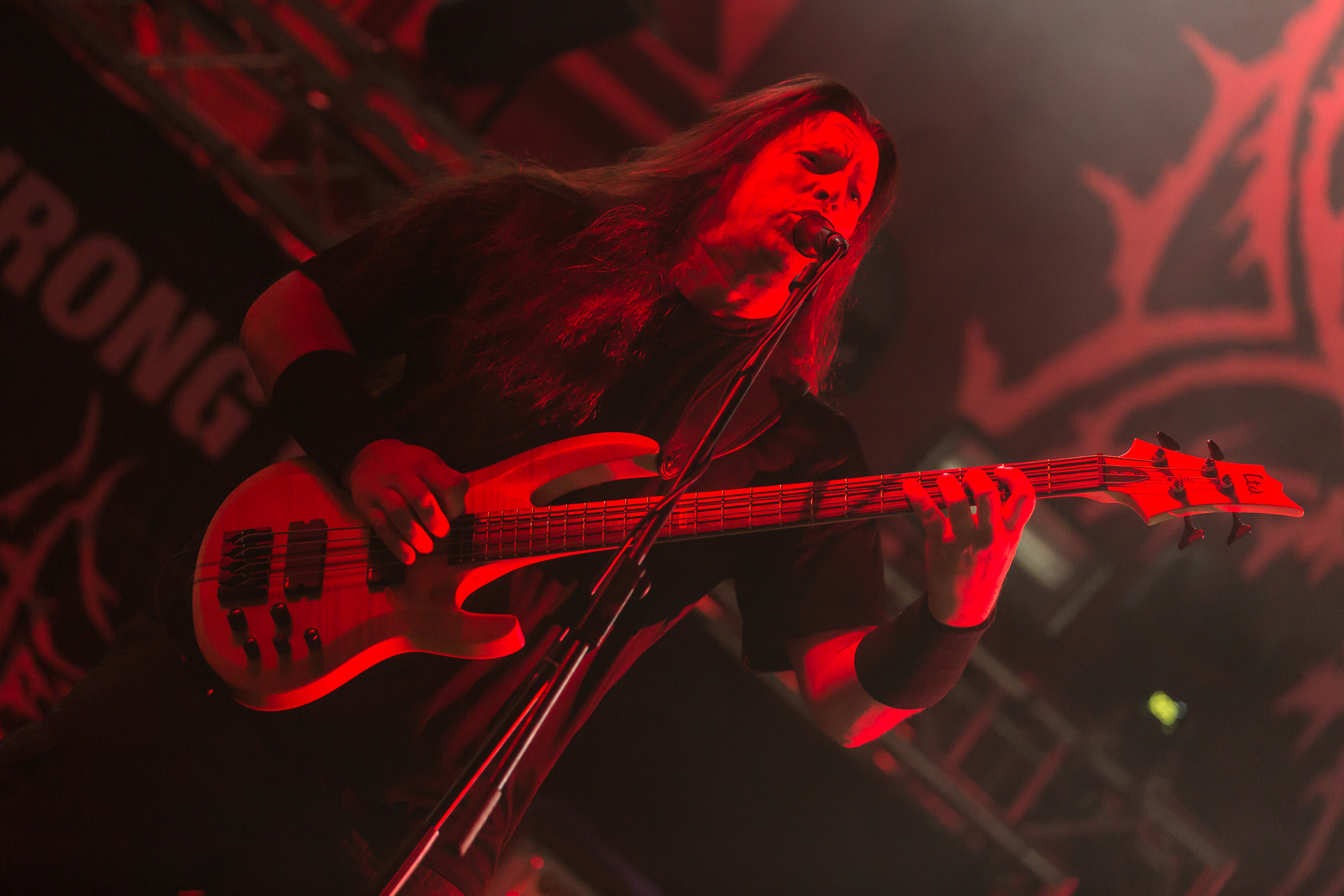
Sean Beasley, one of the two growling vocalists of American death metal band Dying Fetus

The death growl, also called growl, is an extended vocal technique usually employed in extreme styles of music, particularly in death metal and other extreme subgenres of heavy metal music. Though death growl vocals may be criticized for their "ugliness" and inability to be understood without an accompanying lyric sheet, some contend that the gruff presentation of such techniques contribute to death metal's abrasive style when considered alongside its often dark and obscene subject matter.

Death metal, in particular, is associated with growled vocals; it tends to be lyrically and thematically darker and more morbid than other forms of metal, and features vocals which attempt to evoke chaos, death, and misery by being "usually very deep, guttural, and unintelligible". Natalie Purcell notes, "Although the vast majority of death metal bands use very low, beast-like, almost indiscernible growls as vocals, many also have high and screechy or operatic vocals, or simply deep and forcefully-sung vocals." Sociologist Deena Weinstein has noted of death metal: "Vocalists in this style have a distinctive sound, growling and snarling rather than singing the words, and making ample use of the voice distortion box." The low, raspy, aggressive pitch of Lemmy Kilmister of Motörhead, Conrad "Cronos" Lant of Venom and Tom Warrior of Celtic Frost were not unlike the death growl and may be thought of as precursors to the current style.

== Terminology and technique ==
"Wikipedia" as a death growl

Death growls and their variants are also known as death metal vocals, brutal vocals, guttural vocals, death grunts, growled vocals, low-pitched vocals, low growls, as umbrella terms, unclean vocals and harsh vocals, and for a different technique, vocal fry, glottal fry, false cord vocals and death cord vocals. Despite the misconceptions and stereotypes that are associated with them, usually by non-extreme metal fans, death growls require traditional clean/melodic vocal techniques to be done properly.

...You have to change your way of thinking about death metal vocals. Many metal singers think that it's all about yelling or screaming. That's actually not the case unless you want permanent damage to your voice. Rather... singing death metal is an organic vocal effect that you learn to master. And it's actually the opposite of what many think.

In June 2007, Radboud University Nijmegen Medical Centre in the Netherlands reported that, because of the increased popularity of growling in the region, several patients who had used improper growling techniques were being treated for edema and polyps on the vocal folds.

In 2005, professional vocal coach Melissa Cross released the instructional DVD The Zen of Screaming, to teach students the proper way to sing in several styles of rock, metal and hardcore. It has since been re-released as a digital download.

== See also ==
- Screaming in music
- Screaming (in general)
- Heavy metal singing
- Strident vowel
- Harsh voice
- Creaky voice
- Ingressive sound
- Pharyngealization
- Voiced epiglottal trill
