= ES Guitars =

American guitar manufacturer

ES GUITARS
- Company type: Private
- Industry: Musical instruments
- Founded: 2003
- Founder: Giuseppe Coppola
- Headquarters: LIC, New York, United States
- Area served: Worldwide
- Products: electric guitars
- Owner: ES GUITARS, LLC.
- Website: www. esguitars.com
- Footnotes / references Went out of business in 2015

ES Guitars is an American guitar manufacturer of electric guitars and bass guitars. Established in 2003, the company manufactures guitars in Connecticut but the main office is located in New York. The company focuses on heavy metal and hard rock guitars.

A prominent user of ES Guitars was Anders Nyström of the Swedish band Bloodbath. The guitar was used on Bloodbath's “The Wacken Carnage" DVD.

The company went out of business in 2015.

== Guitar Models ==
The company has several guitar and bass models such as the ES-86, ES- 87 and Metal Dagger.

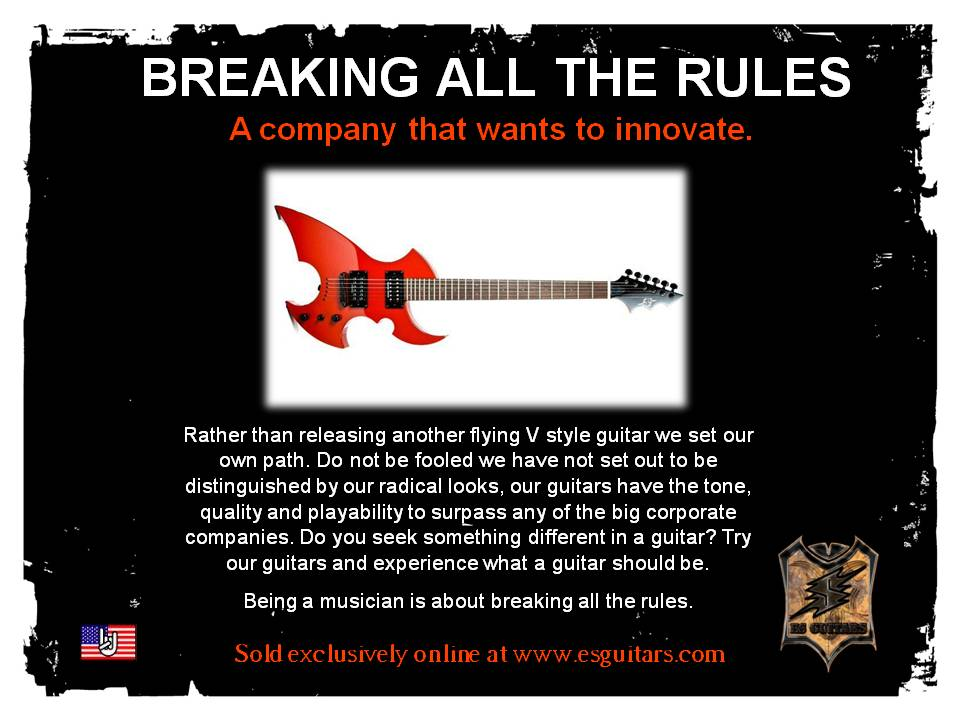
ES GUITARS- Metal Dagger Guitar Design
