= Heavy metal lyrics =

Themes and social perceptions of the words in heavy metal music

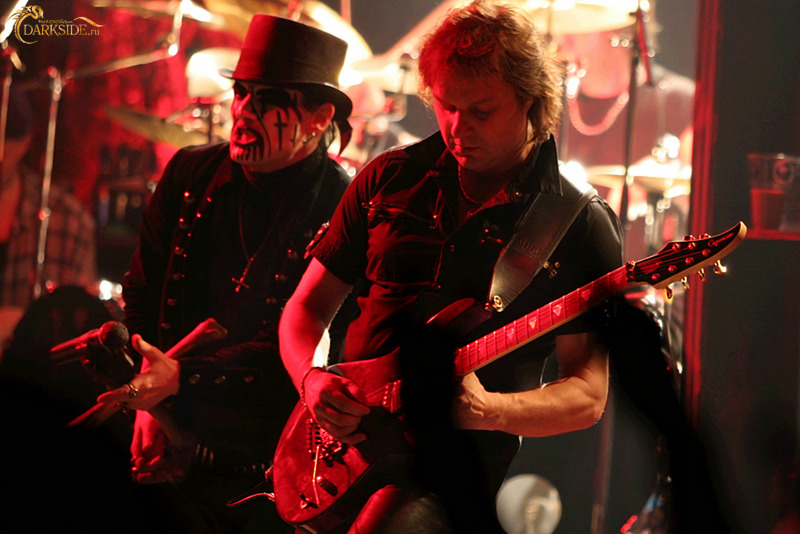
King Diamond is known for writing conceptual lyrics about horror stories

Heavy metal lyrics are the words used in songs by heavy metal artists. Given that there are many genres of heavy metal, it is difficult to make generalizations about the lyrics and lyrical themes. In 1989, two metal scholars wrote that heavy metal lyrics concentrate "on dark and depressing subject matter to an extent hitherto unprecedented" in any form of popular music. Jeffrey Arnett states that metal songs are "overwhelmingly dominated" by "ugly and unhappy" themes which express "no hope" for the future.

Deena Weinstein has proposed one way to analyze metal song themes is loosely grouping them into two categories: the Dionysian theme (a reference to the Roman God of wine), which celebrates "sex, drugs and rock and roll", partying, and enjoyment of life and the Chaotic theme, which involves dark subjects such as Hell, injustice, mayhem, carnage and death. Not all metal genres fall into Weinstein's two theme model; for example power metal's lyrical themes often focus on fantasy and mythology, camaraderie and hope, personal struggles and emotions, among other themes. Another exception is pop metal bands, which replaced "gloom and doom" themes with "positive, upbeat" songs about romantic love and relationships, part of their goal of appealing more to female listeners. In metal overall, the small number of metal songs about relationships are typically about unions that have "gone sour" long ago.

The thematic content of heavy metal lyrics has long been a target of criticism. According to Jon Pareles, "Heavy metal's main subject matter is simple and virtually universal. With grunts, moans and subliterary lyrics, it celebrates a party without limits. The bulk of the music is stylized and formulaic." Music critics have often deemed metal lyrics juvenile and banal, and others have objected to what they see as advocacy of misogyny and the occult. During the 1980s, the Parents Music Resource Center (PMRC) petitioned the U.S. Congress to regulate the popular music industry due to what the group asserted were objectionable lyrics, particularly those in heavy metal songs. The PMRC used music professor Joe Stuessy to testify against metal. Professor Stuessy alleged that heavy metal songs focus on violence, substance abuse, perversion, S&M, and Satanism. Robert Walser analyzed 88 metal songs' themes to determine if Professor Stuessy's claims were valid. In Walser's analysis, the dominant theme in the metal songs was "longing for intensity"; he found that the negative themes described by Stuessy and the PMRC were uncommon. Jeffrey Arnett analysed the lyrics from 115 metal songs: he found that the top three messages were "grim themes" about violence, angst and protest.

Metal artists have had to defend their lyrics in front of the U.S. Senate and in courtrooms. In 1985, Twisted Sister frontman Dee Snider was asked to defend his song "Under the Blade" at a U.S. Senate hearing. In 1986, Ozzy Osbourne was sued because of the lyrics of his song "Suicide Solution". In 1990, Judas Priest was sued in American court by the parents of two young men who had shot themselves five years earlier, allegedly after hearing the subliminal statement "do it" in a Priest song. While the case attracted a great deal of media attention, it was ultimately dismissed. In some predominantly Muslim countries, heavy metal has been officially denounced as a threat to traditional values. In countries such as Morocco, Egypt, Lebanon, and Malaysia, there have been incidents of heavy metal musicians and fans being arrested and incarcerated.

== History ==
There were "heavy"-sounding bands before Black Sabbath, such as Led Zeppelin and Cream. However, the use of "dark and aggressive music" and "offensive lyrics" at the same time was started by Black Sabbath. Black Sabbath 's second album Paranoid (1970) "included songs dealing with personal trauma—'Paranoid' and 'Fairies Wear Boots' (which described the unsavoury side effects of drug-taking)—as well as those confronting wider issues, such as the self-explanatory 'War Pigs' and 'Hand of Doom.'" Black Sabbath's drummer, Bill Ward, states that the band chose its darker lyrical themes because they were "sick and tired of all the [hippie] bullshit- love your brother and flower power forever" and the romantic themes about being "hung up" about a woman that were popular in mainstream music. Metal lyrics often demonstrate a "bad attitude" and "political incorrectness" and it tends to have "occult and satanic symbolism".

Deriving from the heavy metal genre's roots in blues music, sex is another important topic—a thread running from Led Zeppelin's suggestive lyrics to the more explicit references of glam metal and nu metal bands. Some themes are excluded in most heavy metal, such as optimistic, hope-filled songs, songs about romantic love or songs with a 1960s counterculture message of trying to change the world. In general, metal lyrics are not lighthearted and they do typically not make use of satire.

Research by Karen Bettez Halnon showed that songs enjoyed by heavy metal fans are seen as an alternative to listening to the "impersonal, conformist, superficial and numbing realities of [the] commercialism" that's present in popular, non-niche music genres.

== Themes ==
=== Occult ===
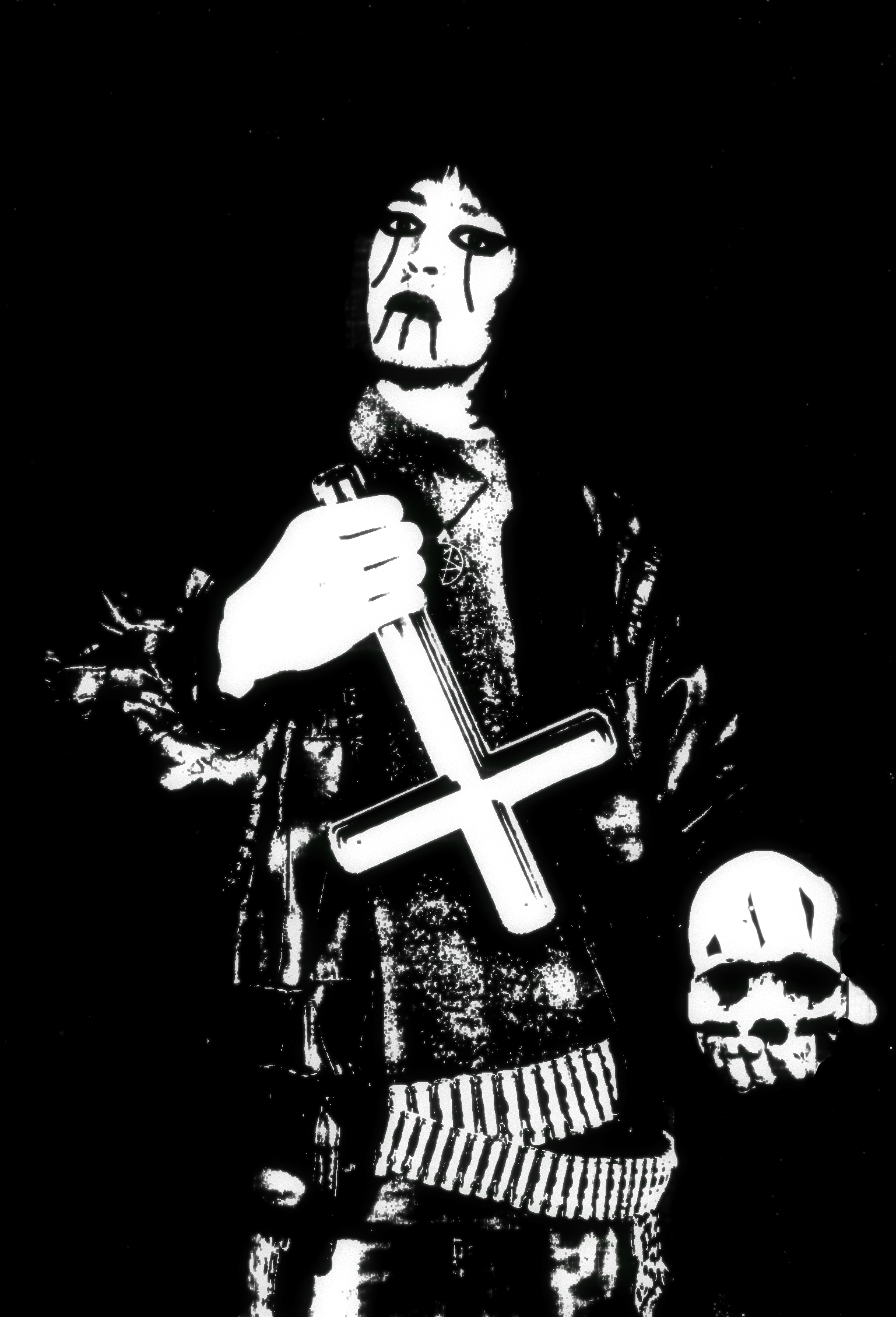
Black metal bands have song lyrics that refer to occult subjects and death.

Occult themes and references to "occult religious practices" are used in metal lyrics. References to Satanism and Gothic horror are present in heavy metal lyrics. As an example of references to Satan, the song "Hell Awaits" by Slayer "glorifies Satanic rule". The metal band Cradle of Filth writes lyrics which mix "Satanism, occult" and horror movie themes.

Death metal songs involve themes of "horror, gore and environmental and social decay", including descriptions of dismemberment and "botched forensic procedures." James Parker states that while the use of Hell- and underworld-oriented themes in heavy metal can be "dark and disturbing", they are "honest about human nature", and as such, listening to metal lyrics can be beneficial for listeners' mental health (he says metal lyrics can "keep us sane").

=== War and violence ===
A key theme in heavy metal lyrics is the "pointless horror and destruction of war". A number of heavy metal songs criticize war, including "War Pigs" (Black Sabbath); "One" (Metallica); "Symphony of Destruction" (Megadeth) and "Now You've Got Something To Die For" (Lamb of God). Heavy metal has a "lyrical fixation with dark themes, including war, destruction, doom and misery." Heavy metal lyrics focus on the "poetics of destruction", such as "death, mutilation and physical violence." Ronald Pogue states that death metal songs have "violent, aggressive and angry lyrics". Later thrash metal bands' songs "questioned injustices such as warfare".

=== Religion ===
Even the earliest heavy metal used religion in its lyrical themes, notably Black Sabbath, which usually performed with a crucifix, even though their music had messages about black magic. In the 1980s groups such as Slayer and Venom showed a "fascination with religion", which can be seen in "Slayer's groundbreaking 1986 album "Reign in Blood", which features "Larry Carroll's satanic-themed cover art." Metal bands may have been fascinated with religion to antagonize "conservative Christian groups" that criticized metal. Through the late 1980s and into the early 1990s, anti-Christian messages in metal got more extreme, with Deicide releasing songs such as "Kill the Christian."

Some metal songs criticize religion, such as "Death Church" by Machine Head, which "criticizes the hypocrisy of the Christian church." Metal groups "...seek out every...avenue to assault religion", including "religious hypocrisy", specifically Christianity. Metal songs use themes from the New Testament Book of Revelation which focus on apocalypse (e.g., Iron Maiden's "The Number of the Beast"). The metal subgenre with the most emphasis on apocalyptic themes is thrash metal. Black metal song lyrics usually " attack Christianity" using "...apocalyptic language" and "Satanic" elements. Bands with explicitly Christian lyrics make up a distinct subculture in the heavy metal community, sometimes called white metal in contrast to black metal.

=== Women ===
Heavy metal lyrics have been called "...callous toward women" and the PMRC claimed in the 1980s that metal songs are misogynistic and that they promote rape and other violence towards women. Andrew Cope states that claims that heavy metal lyrics are misogynistic are "clearly misguided" as these critics have "overlooked the overwhelming evidence that suggests otherwise." Craig Hayes states that metal "clearly empowers women".

Cope states that there are styles of rock music that contain misogynistic lyrics, but he says this is mostly "blues-based rock music" and "cock rock". Contrary to the claims of anti-metal critics, Cope states that "metal has opened up a space for women", and there has been significant growth" in the number of female metal performers since the mid-1990s. Some metal bands even have male/female co-lead vocalists (e.g., Nightwish and Lacuna Coil) and in the 2000s, mainstream metal magazines such as Terrorizer have had a number of articles and cover stories about female metal artists.

=== Drugs and alcohol ===
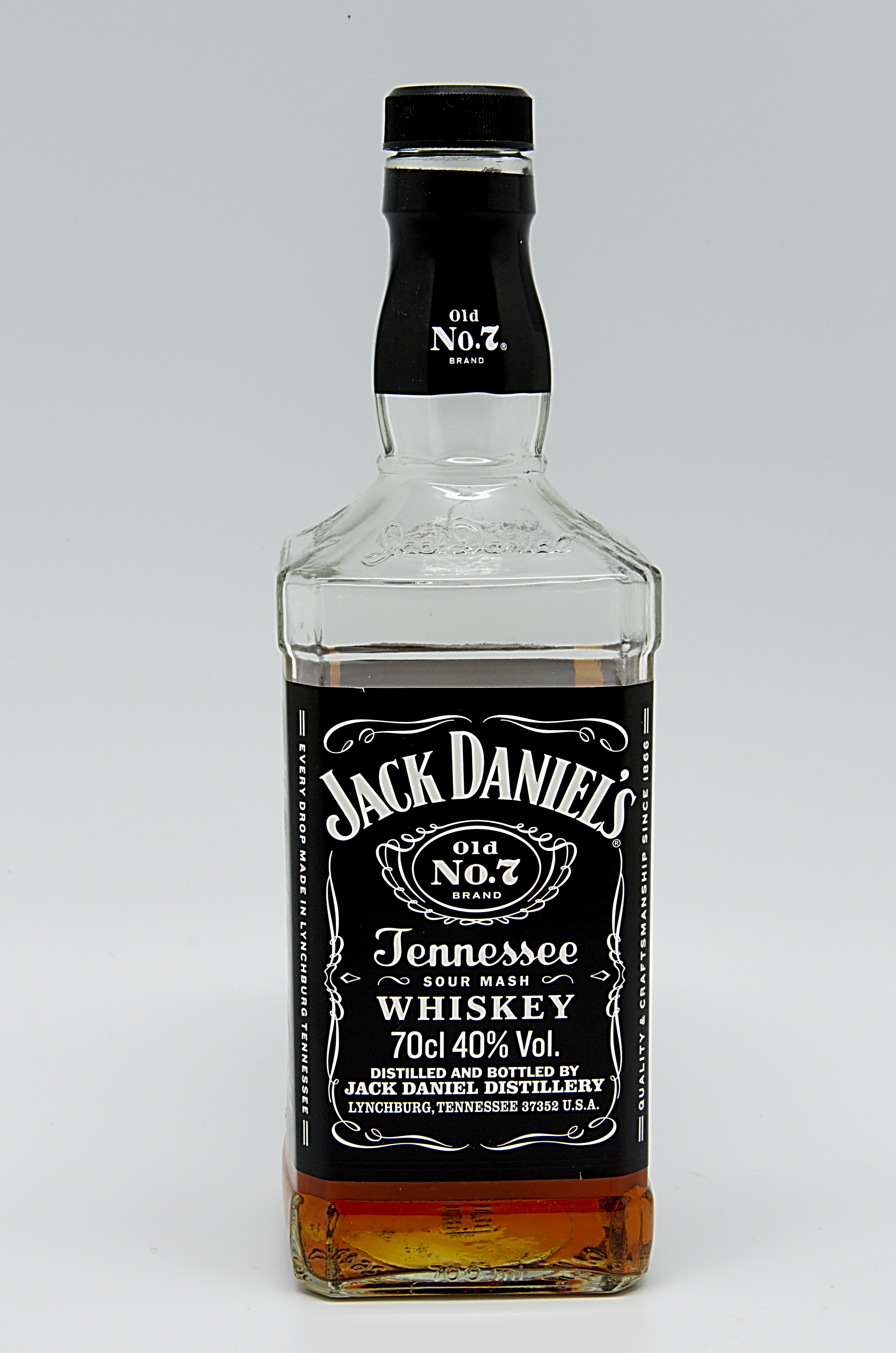
Jack Daniel's whiskey is celebrated in heavy metal culture. Head shops sell T-shirts and belt buckles with the brand's distinctive label. Carnivore has a song about the drink, entitled "Jack Daniels And Pizza".

Heavy metal lyrics make references to "substance abuse". Even the name of the genre, "heavy metal", has been called a drug reference, as it was taken from the William Burroughs story Nova Express, in which the author used the term to refer to "addictive drugs". Weinstein states that drug use is not used much as a lyrical theme in metal, because drugs do not "resonate with the power" of heavy metal music (Black Sabbath's "Sweet Leaf", a song that celebrates marijuana, is a notable exception). Andy Bennett states that the classic era-heavy metal themes of sex, drugs and rock and roll are not present in extreme metal; in these subgenres, if songs refer to drugs, it is usually a warning about the dangers of drug use. There are a number of metal songs that celebrate drinking alcohol and drunkenness, e.g., Saxon's "Party Till You Puke"; W.A.S.P's "Blind in Texas"; AC/DC's "Have A Drink On Me"; Hellyeah's "Drink, Drank, Drunk"; Black Label Society's "Born To Booze"; Carnivore's "Jack Daniels And Pizza"; and Hammer Fight's "I Didn't Like Drinking (Until I Started Drinking)".

In an analysis of Black Sabbath songs from 1970 to 2013, 13% of the songs had substance use references; however, 60% of these references depicted substance use in a negative way. "Contrary to the notion that heavy metal music glorifies or encourages substance use..., Black Sabbath's lyrics...weave a cautionary tale of how persistent substance use can hijack free will, become the dominant focus" of the user's life, and lead to misery. Although the early albums had some positive references to drugs, but almost all of the later albums' references to drug use were negative, with songs alluding to the "misery of having their life ruled (and possibly ruined) by drug use. Black Sabbath songs warn listeners that they can lose their dignity and end up "constantly suffering", due to the "raw horror of addiction".

Finnish metal bands from the 1990s such as Niskalaukaus, Kotiteollisuus and Viikate have songs that about "problem drinking" and the "misery of alcoholism", which describe situations where men try to "escape from the miseries of life" and deal with their shame by "excessive drinking".

=== Rock and roll and metal ===
There are a number of metal songs which "praise rock or rock and roll", but these songs should not be thought of literally, as extolling the merits of early 1950s rock and roll. Weinstein states that in these metal songs, the words "rock" or "rock and roll" refer specifically to heavy metal and its important role. Examples include AC/DC's "Rocker"; Judas Priest's "Rock Hard, Ride Free"; Sammy Hagar's "Rock 'n' Roll Weekend"; Twisted Sister's "I Believe in Rock 'n' Roll" and "You Can't Stop Rock'n'Roll"; Motorhead's "Rock 'n' Roll"; and Ozzy's "You Can't Kill Rock and Roll".

Some songs are self-referential to the genre. Many of these songs directly praise heavy metal (or simply "metal") and celebrate its importance. Examples include Sammy Hagar's "Heavy Metal"; Judas Priest's "Metal Meltdown"; Metallica's "Metal Militia"; Anvil's "Metal On Metal"; Venom's "Black Metal"; 3 Inches Of Blood's "Metal Woman"; Exodus's "Metal Command"; and Manowar's "Die For Metal". Some songs refer to both metal and rock and roll, such as Rock Goddess' "Heavy Metal Rock 'n' Roll".

=== Sexual aspects ===
Heavy metal lyrics contain themes about "sexual excess". Some metal songs by Cannibal Corpse contain a "depiction of sexualized violence". Weinstein states that while "lust and sex" are important lyrical themes for most metal bands (apart from Black Sabbath), sex is depicted as fun and "without commitments", but it is not depicted as sadistic or violent, as critics of metal lyrics often claim. Examples of sex-themed metal songs include AC/DC's "Shoot to Thrill"; Krokus' "Long Stick Goes Boom"; AC/DC's "Whole Lotta Rosie"; Motörhead's "Fast And Loose"; and W.A.S.P.'s "Animal (Fuck Like A Beast)". The Mentors became infamous for their sexual shock rock lyrics, most notably the song Golden Shower which had its lyrics read during the PMRC hearings.

=== Politics and social themes ===
Craig Hayes states that politics is inherent in every metal band's message; he states that while these political messages vary, they are often being a critique of "mainstream political and social mores." While thrash metal bands aimed their songs at a " similar suburban working class audience that characterized the hardcore scenes", "thrash metal musicians were much less ardent in their politics than most hardcore bands" because for thrash musicians, hardcore was too "preachy" and "message"-focused (e.g., left wing hardcore songs like Dead Kennedys' "California Uber Alles"). But this does not mean that thrash bands did not have lyrics with political content; thrash bands did "question injustices such as industrial capitalism, warfare, the environment and social control". As well, lyrics in thrash metal often deal with social issues and reproach for The Establishment, using direct and denunciatory language, an approach which thrash borrowed from hardcore punk.

=== Appropriated lyrics ===
Some bands reinterpret existing lyrics in a metal style. For example, the lyrics of the version of pop hit Summer Night City by ABBA are taken almost literally by the symphonic metal band Therion in their version, but the changes in music and video alter their meaning. The Spanish Romantic poem Canción del pirata ("Pirate's Song") by José Espronceda has been put to music by the Spanish heavy metal band Tierra Santa. The lyrics follow the poem but for being split into two songs. Spanish author Arturo Pérez Reverte contrasted favorably Tierra Santa's popularization of a classic with the official effort of "trashy" education programs in Spain.

== Metal genres ==
=== Black metal ===
"Black metal songs are meant to be like Calvinist sermons; deadly serious attempts to unite the true believers". Misanthropy, global catastrophe, war, death, destruction and rebirth are also common themes. In the early years of black metal, the subgenre's lyrics often "fused virulent anti-christian politics with Nietzschean-inspired satanism and ecological mysticism", with some bands' lyrics exploring themes relating to "Occultism, Nietzsche, paganism, [and] mystical Nazism". Another topic often found in black metal lyrics is that of the wild and extreme aspects and phenomena of the natural world, particularly the wilderness, forests, mountains, winter, storms, and blizzards. Black metal also has a fascination with the distant past. Many bands write about the mythology and folklore of their homelands and promote a revival of pre-Christian, pagan traditions. A significant number of bands write lyrics only in their native language and a few (such as Burzum and Arckanum) have lyrics in archaic languages such as Old Norse.

=== Death metal ===
The lyrical themes of death metal may invoke slasher film-stylized violence, religion (sometimes Satanism), occultism, Lovecraftian horror, nature, mysticism, mythology, philosophy, science fiction, and politics, and they may describe extreme acts, including mutilation, dissection, torture, rape, cannibalism, and necrophilia. Even though death metal's songs have been described as containing "images of extreme violence", fans "report feelings of transcendence and positive emotions", which has made psychologists curious to learn why.

The lyrics of death metal bands have been called less important than the song titles and band names (e.g., Autopsy, Cannibal Corpse, Death, Dismember, Napalm Death, Suffocation), because the guttural, "bestial" death growl and screaming style of singing makes it hard to understand the lyrics.

While death metal lyrics tend to be associated with the violent content of bands like Cannibal Corpse and the pro-Satanism lyrics of Deicide, the band Morbid Angel has lyrics with diverse subject matter, ranging from "Sumerian mythology, the Roman Empire, and the works of H.P. Lovecraft."

=== Extreme metal ===
According to ethnographer Keith Kahn-Harris, the defining characteristics of extreme metal can all be regarded as clearly transgressive: the "extreme" traits are all intended to violate or transgress given cultural, artistic, social or aesthetic boundaries. Kahn-Harris states that extreme metal can be " close to being formless noise", at least to the uninitiated listener. He states that with extreme metal lyrics, they often " offer no possibility of hope or redemption" and lyrics often reference apocalyptic themes. Extreme metal lyrics often describe Christianity as weak or submissive, and many songs express misanthropic views such as "kill every thing". A small number of extreme metal bands and song lyrics make reference to far-right politics; for example, the Swedish black metal band Marduk has an obsession with the Nazi Panzer tank, which can be seen in works such as Panzer Division Marduk (1999).

=== Nu metal ===
Lyrics in nu metal songs, which may include hip hop music-style rapping, are often angry or nihilistic; many of the genre's lyrics focus on topics such as pain, angst, bullying, emotional issues, abandonment, betrayal, and personal alienation, in a way similar to those of grunge. A lot of nu metal lyrics that are about these topics tend to be in a very direct tone. Describing Korn's 1994 album, one reviewer stated that the "lyrics were raw and confessional in nature, addressing themes of child sexual abuse, violence and drug use." In 2000, The Guardian stated that nu metal lyrics are "filled with doom and bitterness", "lots of swearing", criticism of "the 'system'", with "very little sex, and no satanism."

The Michigan Daily wrote about Limp Bizkit's lyrics, writing that the band "used the nu-metal sound as a way to spin testosterone fueled fantasies into snarky white-boy rap. Oddly, audiences took frontman Fred Durst more seriously than he wanted, failing to see the intentional silliness in many of his songs". Dope's lyrics are usually about sex, drugs, parties, women, violence and relationships. In 2011, Courtney Love declined to perform alongside Limp Bizkit in the Australian music festival Soundwave due to the band's allegedly sexist statements. Limp Bizkit's lyrics have been described as "misogynistic", such as the 2013 song "Ready to Go", with the lyrics "is that your bitch, cause she told me she's ready to go."

However, some nu metal songs have lyrics that are about other topics. P.O.D. have used positive lyrics about promise and hope. Drowning Pool's "Bodies" is about moshing. Wayne Swinny of Saliva said that the band's song "Badass" was "meant to be one of those 'sports anthem kind of songs' ". According to Josh Chesler of the Phoenix New Times, the lyrics of Deftones, whose style is a mix of nu metal and post-hardcore, "tend to have complex allusions and leave the songs open to many different interpretations." Raw Alternative praises the lyrics on Incubus' Make Yourself (1999), noting they are not "as angst-y as most of its nu metal contemporaries either, and instead takes turns into the philosophical and ethereal." Michael Siebert states that a "significant portion of the genre's appeal was in the lyrics", with Korn and other groups dealing with "transgressive themes"; Linkin Park "frankly addressing suicidal ideation and alienation"; and Slipknot and Mudvayne expressing "nihilistic rage".

=== Power metal ===
Power metal's lyrical themes often focus on fantasy and mythology, camaraderie and hope, personal struggles and emotions, war and death, or combinations of the listed themes. Power metal songs focus on themes that "appeal to the listener's sense of valor and loveliness".

== Censorship and legal issues ==
From its earliest years, heavy metal bands have aimed at "...breaking taboos and inciting debate" with their "confronting music, themes and imagery", which is a key part of metal's "creative culture". Craig Hayes acknowledges that metal lyrics have included "...hurtful, heinous and horrific ideas"; indeed, he states that "a lot of metal strives for offensiveness for the simple pleasure of misadventure", which leads to "mind-bending, degenerate and wonderfully hostile musical journeys" that provide a "purge and release" for listeners. Metal lyrics contain "abundant potentially offensive material", due to "metal's inherently transgressive nature." Most of the time, metal explores transgressive themes symbolically, with the "transgression serving as a tool of expression", as with any other artform.

=== 1980s–1990s ===
In the 1980s, the lyrics of heavy metal led to "panicking parents"; however, since then, "culturally, metal has lost its boogeyman" status to gangsta rap. In 1985, Twisted Sister frontman Dee Snider was asked to defend his song "Under the Blade" at a U.S. Senate hearing. At the hearing, the PMRC alleged that the song was about sadomasochism and rape; Snider stated that the song was about his bandmate's throat surgery. In 1986, Ozzy Osbourne was sued because of the lyrics of his song "Suicide Solution". A lawsuit against Osbourne was filed by the parents of John McCollum, a depressed teenager who committed suicide allegedly after listening to Osbourne's song. Osbourne was not found responsible for the teen's death. In 1990, Judas Priest was sued in American court by the parents of two young men who had shot themselves five years earlier, allegedly after hearing the subliminal statement "do it" in a Priest song. While the case attracted a great deal of media attention, it was ultimately dismissed. Marilyn Manson had gained controversy for his music allegedly inspiring the Columbine High School massacre.

In 1991, UK police seized death metal records from the British record label Earache Records, in an "unsuccessful attempt to prosecute the label for obscenity". In 1997, the Egyptian police jailed many young metal fans and they were accused of "devil worship" and blasphemy, after police found metal recordings during searches of their homes.

=== 2000s ===
In 2012, the Norwegian metal band Taake, which was nominated for the Norwegian Spellemann Award (the Norwegian equivalent of a Grammy Award), included allegedly anti-Muslim lyrics in their music, including the phrases "To hell with Muhammud and the Mohammedans" and their "unforgivable customs". In 2013, Malaysia banned Lamb of God from performing in their country, on the grounds that the "band's lyrics could be interpreted as being religiously insensitive" and blasphemous. Specifically, the Malaysian government indicated that the band has used "excerpts from the Quran" in their lyrics.

In 2014, a Russian court banned the lyrics and album covers of Cannibal Corpse on the grounds that they depict "violence, the physical and mental abuse of people and animals, murder and suicide", which the court held could "damage the mental health of minors". In September 2014, a man from Kentucky who "posted the verses of the Exodus song "Class Dismissed (A Hate Primer)"" on his Facebook account was "jailed and accused of terrorist threats". The lyrics the man posted on Facebook read: "student bodies lying dead in the halls, a blood splattered treatise of hate / Class dismissed is my hypothesis, gun fire ends in debate." The American Civil Liberties Union (ACLU) is defending the man, using a First Amendment of the Constitution of United States of America freedom of speech argument.

== Impacts ==
=== Alleged violent, drug-related, antisocial and occult content or impacts ===
Protest the Hero, shown here at a show in May 2007, had their music used in a study on the impact of aggression on listeners.

Heavy metal has been the subject of critiques from "music industry watchdogs and parents' groups for its violent, drug-related, sexual, antisocial and occult lyrics". During the 1980s, the PMRC, an advocacy group which was against the alleged presence of negative themes in popular music, used music professor Joe Stuessy to testify against metal. Professor Stuessy alleged that heavy metal songs focus on violence, substance abuse, perversion, S&M, and Satanism. Walser analyzed 88 metal songs' themes to determine if Professor Stuessy's claims were valid. Walser found that the themes Stuessy claimed were common in metal were actually uncommon in heavy metal songs. In Walser's analysis, the dominant theme in the 88 songs was "longing for intensity". Jeffrey Arnett states that metal songs are "overwhelmingly dominated" by "ugly and unhappy" themes which express "no hope" for the future.

In an experiment on aggression and heavy metal music, male college students who were exposed to violent-themed lyrics from the metal band Protest the Hero (the songs "Bloodmeat" and "Limb from Limb") behaved in a more aggressive fashion. Specifically, the students added more hot sauce to a cup of water that they believed that another person would have to drink. In Stack's 2001 analysis of metal songs, he found consistent messages of "hopelessness and loneliness" and he discovered a "positive correlation between heavy metal fandom and suicide acceptability" in the study participants. In 2013, Rafalovich and Schneider analyzed the lyrical content of US and European heavy metal bands and found many themes of "violence and aggression."

=== Perception of lyrics by listeners ===
Deena Weinstein states that heavy metal lyrics are "...meant to be heard rather than read" from a page. Weinstein states that the "total sound" of the band in metal is more important than any of the parts, including the lead vocals. Weinstein states that metal lyrics should not be interpreted literally; instead, she states that they are "figurative" and "suggestive". While Weinstein states that the lead vocal part is not as important as the overall sound of the band, "Wass showed that 87% of adolescent heavy metal fans knew the lyrics to their favorite songs". Similarly, Professor Hannelor found that metal fans "...listen more and know the words of songs better than fans of general rock music."

=== Positive effects ===
Andy Bennett states that while extreme metal's lyrical themes include " destruction, decay and disease, disillusion, corruption through power, confusion and isolation", these themes "resonate" with the real-world challenges that young people face in modern society. Bennett also states that metal lyrics can enable young people to deal with and "face the difficulties in their lives." Epstein and Pratto state that "many heavy metal songs have socially constructive lyrics" which show "concern for the world that youth will inherit."

Craig Hayes states that metal "clearly empowers women, and people of all ethnicities, sexualities and classes." Queer heavy metal fans have stated that metal lyrics "spoke to their experiences of trauma, oppression and marginalization". Metal is a "fantastically visceral vent" to purge frustrations and provide catharsis. Josh Haun argues that "...metal lyrics are pure fantasy", so listening to violent lyrics is no different than watching a horror film. Hayes praises metal lyrics for addressing "challenging" and "contentious" issues in its lyrics, in contrast to "bland" chart-topping pop music which does not examine these serious issues. Hayes states that the challenging nature of metal lyrics "inspire discussion", as metal lyrics are "unquestioningly thought provoking". Robert L. Gross states that heavy metal can be viewed as a "musical and cultural excursion into fantasy land". A 2015 study titled "Extreme Metal Music and Anger Processing" showed that "listening to extreme [metal] music may represent a healthy way of processing anger".

A study indicated that heavy metal is a positive influence on smart children and teens; it was called "a comfort for the bright child". As well, the study showed that "...intelligent teenagers often listen to heavy metal music to cope with the pressures" of being smart. The study found that metal listening is not associated with delinquency and poor academic achievement. The study indicated that teen metal listeners use metal to "...help them deal with the stresses and strains of being gifted" (highly intelligent), as it acts as a "cathartic" to enable the teens to deal with alienation and "purge negativity".

Professor Bill Thompson from Australia's Macquarie University studied the impact of listening to death metal and found that it brings joy to fans, and that it does not "desensitize" them to the depictions of violence in the songs. He found that death metal fans derive pleasure from listening to violence-oriented themes in the same way that general listeners enjoy listening to sad songs that are intended to "elicit unhappiness". Thompson came to this conclusion by having a group of death metal fans and a group of non-fans listen to Bloodbath's song "Eaten" (which is about cannibalism) and, for comparison, Pharrell Williams' upbeat pop hit "Happy", while showing violent and non-violent images and recording the peoples' responses. He says that the results of his study should be "reassuring to parents or religious groups" who are concerned that youth who listen to death metal may be adversely affected. Bloodbath lead singer Nick Holmes praised the study, stating that it proves that his "lyrics are harmless fun" that are no more dangerous than a person watching horror movies or hobbyists doing battle re-enactments.

=== Potential concerns ===
Epstein and Pratto state there is a risk that metal listeners may misunderstand or misinterpret song lyrics, since it is hard to hear the words in the "...complex, loud" music. Metal songs typically have powerful, heavily distorted guitars and loud, aggressive drumming, which can make it hard to hear the vocals. For example, even though Ozzy's song "Suicide Solution" is about the "evils of alcohol", "many...listeners incorrectly believe the song advocates suicide." A study states that young people who listen to heavy metal and some other types of rock have an "increased risk of suicide."

Young heavy metal fans have "more problems with school authorities and teachers" and these listeners are more likely to engage in "delinquency" and "reckless behavior" (the latter issue was also associated with listening to rap). Swedish and US studies from the 1990s showed that heavy metal fans had "decreased motivation for school, lower grades" and an increased potential for dropping out. Studies from the 1980s and 1990s in the US showed that fans of heavy metal were more likely to use drugs and alcohol; as well, heavy metal fans, along with those who like hip-hop, techno and reggae, were associated with "smoking, drinking and cannabis use". Victor Strasburger acknowledges the studies that show a correlation between heavy metal listening and adolescent issues such as drug use, but he questions the "chicken-and-egg" link, asking whether the association arises because "high[-]risk teens who are angry like to listen to heavy metal music because it validates how they feel, or does the music "make" them do things they would not ordinarily do?"

Craig Hayes states that since metal artists constantly explore "transgressive topics" in their song lyrics and themes, there are examples of metal songs with "...sexism and misogyny" and "racism, and homophobia". Hayes states that as a result of this "transgressive" exploration mindset, some metal song lyrics "...will always be offensive to someone." Gavin Russell states his concern with specific "post-millennial metalcore splinter genres' obsession with the punishment of women" and their lyrics, which he alleges "justify violent misogyny". A small number of "ultranationalist black metal" bands have "controversial far-right political opinions" related to Nazism or racism.

Simon Tatz from the Mental Health Council of Australia states that metal music "has some worrying aspects", including the nihilistic lyrics that may "reinforce alienation and exclusion". A University of Melbourne scholar, Dr Katrina McFerran, found that "young people at risk of depression are more likely to be listening to music, particularly heavy metal music, in a negative way", typically listening over and over to the same song or album "to isolate themselves or escape from reality", which she says could "suggest suicidal tendencies."

== See also ==
- Heavy metal singing
