= Heavy metal singing =

Style of singing

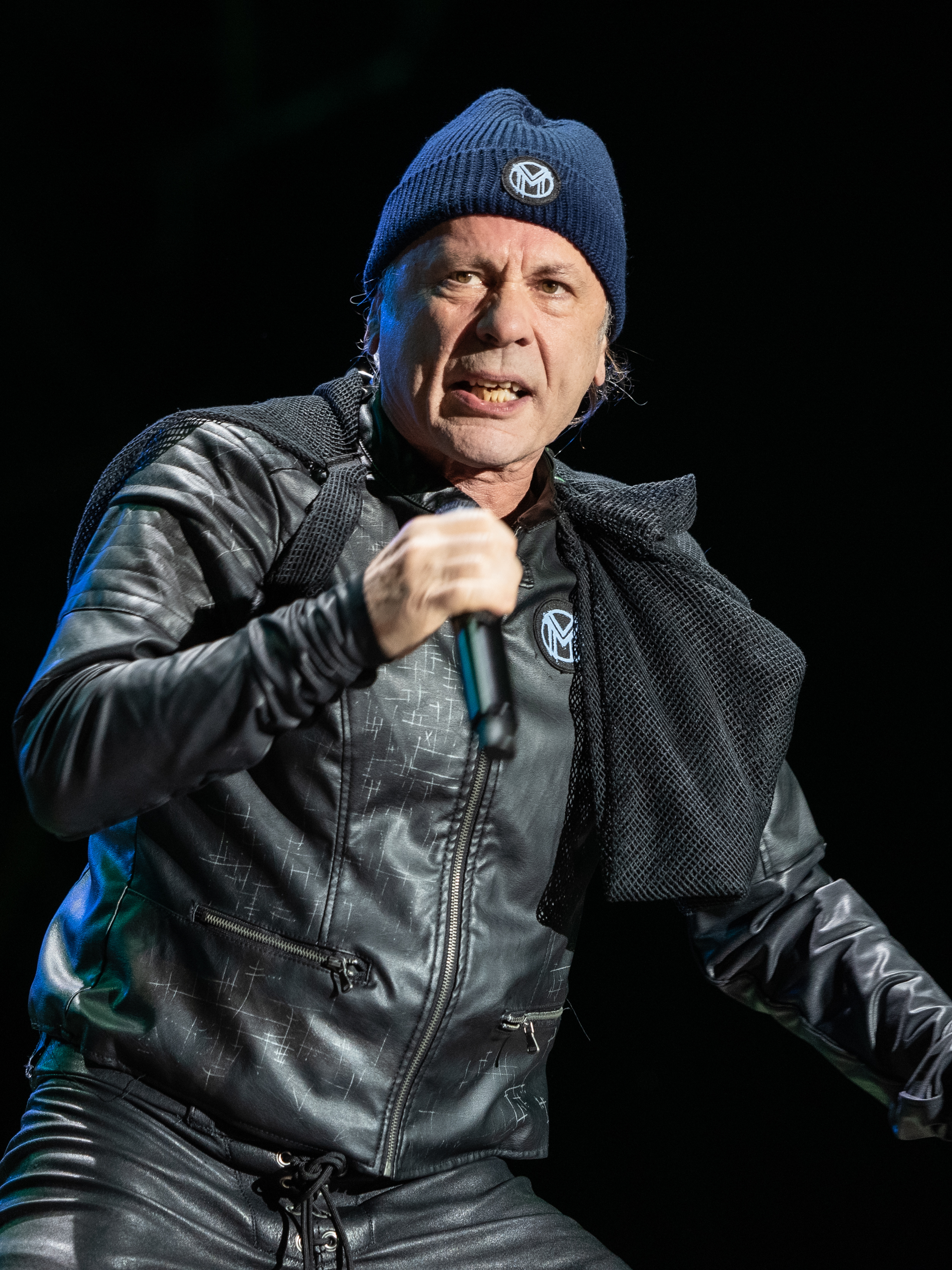
Heavy metal singer Bruce Dickinson of Iron Maiden

Heavy metal singing is a style of singing associated with heavy metal music.

KSL-FM states that heavy metal vocals are a distinct style from what are considered "clean vocals", in that they are generally harsher-sounding and that they "contract their airways in different ways." The publication states that an understanding of vocal pedagogy and proper technique is necessary for a vocalist to achieve the "trademark" sound associated with heavy metal. Hair metal, by contrast, is associated with a "crooning" style of singing, according to Loudwire.

According to Metal Hammer, Metallica frontman James Hetfield's vocals are akin to "a lionlike roar". The publication described Ozzy Osborne's vocals as "eerie cries". Other heavy metal singers such as Floor Jansen of Nightwish are considered to employ more operatic singing styles.

According to Decibel, singing and clean vocals are less common in heavy metal music than they were during the genre's infancy.

== See also ==
- Death growl
- Heavy metal guitar
- Heavy metal bass
- Heavy metal drumming
- Heavy metal lyrics
- Screaming in music
