= Deena Weinstein =

American sociologist

Deena Weinstein (born March 15, 1943) is a professor of sociology at DePaul University whose research focuses on popular culture. She is particularly well known for her research on heavy metal culture, on which subject she wrote a book, Heavy Metal: A Cultural Sociology (1991), later published in a revised and updated version as Heavy Metal: The Music and Its Culture (2009).

== Career ==
Weinstein holds a PhD from Purdue University. Her 1991 book Heavy Metal: A Cultural Sociology "describes the heavy metal music culture, explains why it has prompted demands for censorship, and argues that the music deserves tolerance and respect." She argues that heavy metal has outlasted many other rock genres largely due to the emergence of an intense, exclusionary, strongly masculine subculture. A review of the book calls it:

A reasonable summary of most academic study so far, which indulges heavy metal as an extreme offshoot of rock in which rebellion is the prime goal and the fundamental ceremony is the live concert. These failings aside, there is very perceptive research here on the origins of heavy metal and the personalities within its culture. The latter is most informative of all aspects in this book and is Weinstein's strength as a writer.

The Chicago Sun-Times called the book the definitive study of heavy metal culture, saying that it "does for metal what Greil Marcus's Lipstick Traces did for the Sex Pistols."

Weinstein was interviewed in the 2005 documentary Metal: A Headbanger's Journey and the later Metal Evolution.

In 2018, the first academic critique of Deena Weinstein’s work on gender in heavy metal was published by Amanda DiGioia and Lyndsay Helfrich, who were graduate students at the time, in Metal Music Studies. The article argues that Weinstein’s methodological approach and conclusions rely on outdated analytical frameworks that insufficiently engage with contemporary feminist theory and the lived realities of women’s participation in metal scenes. Drawing on case studies, media analysis, and feminist scholarship, it contends that her work underestimates the persistence of misogyny, overlooks the significance of social media, and overstates claims associated with postfeminism. While recognising Weinstein’s foundational role in the development of metal music studies, the article concludes that her analysis of gender should be regarded as historically significant but analytically limited, and calls for greater engagement with more recent, intersectional scholarship on gender in heavy metal.
