= List of Dark Angel episodes =

Dark Angel is an American biopunk/cyberpunk science fiction television series created by James Cameron and Charles H. Eglee. It premiered in the United States and Canada on the Fox network on October 3, 2000, but was canceled after two seasons. The show chronicles the life of Max Guevara (X5-452), a genetically enhanced super-soldier, portrayed by Jessica Alba as an adult, and Geneva Locke as a child.

== Series overview ==
| Season | Episodes | Originally released | |
| Season | Episodes | First released | Last released |
|---|---|---|---|
| 1 | 22 | October 3, 2000 | May 22, 2001 |
| 2 | 21 | September 28, 2001 | May 3, 2002 |

== Episodes ==
=== Season 1 (2000–01) ===
| No. overall | No. in season | Title | Directed by | Written by | Original release date | Prod. code |
|---|---|---|---|---|---|---|
| 1 | 1 | "Pilot" | David Nutter | James Cameron & Charles H. Eglee | October 3, 2000 | 1ADE79 |
| 2 | 2 | "Pilot" | David Nutter | James Cameron & Charles H. Eglee | October 3, 2000 | 1ADE79 |
While delivering a package for Jam Pony Express, Max makes plans to break into a penthouse apartment to steal a few items to help finance her search for her Manticore "siblings". In the process she stumbles across Logan, a hacker who uses the name Eyes Only to broadcast information about corruption among the Seattle elite. They form a partnership, with Max agreeing to help Logan with his work in exchange for his assistance in locating the other Manticore children.
| 3 | 3 | "Heat" | Michael Katleman | Patrick Harbinson | October 10, 2000 | 1ADE01 |
In return for Max's help in dealing with a smuggler trafficking in human cargo, Logan locates a woman who gave Max a ride after her escape from Manticore ten years earlier. Due to her DNA being combined with that of a cat, Max goes into 'heat' and struggles against the urge to have anonymous sex.
| 4 | 4 | "Flushed" | Terrence O'Hara | René Echevarria & Charles H. Eglee | October 17, 2000 | 1ADE03 |
Believing Max is on drugs, Kendra and Original Cindy flush Max's tryptophan pills down the toilet unaware that without the medication Max will have seizures that could lead to her death. Max breaks into a hospital to get the medication she needs, but is arrested.
| 5 | 5 | "C.R.E.A.M." "Cash Rules Everything Around Me" | Chris Long | David Zabel | October 31, 2000 | 1ADE02 |
Max comes to Sketchy's rescue after he loses a mobster's money filled package. Meanwhile, Logan is approached by a young woman who wants him to locate her missing father but has a hidden agenda.
| 6 | 6 | "411 on the DL" | Joe Ann Fogle | Doris Egan | November 14, 2000 | 1ADE04 |
Max is convinced that the private detective she hired can reunite her with the leader, escapee, and best friend, Zack, just as Logan is convinced his ex-wife has suddenly changed her ways.
| 7 | 7 | "Prodigy" | David Jackson | Story by : Charles H. Eglee & René Echevarria; Teleplay by : Patrick Harbinson | November 21, 2000 | 1ADE05 |
Max, Logan and Lydecker get trapped in a hostage situation together when the genetic engineering conference they attend is taken over by a group of anti-genetic engineering terrorists.
| 8 | 8 | "Cold Comfort" | Jefery Levy | Jose Molina | November 28, 2000 | 1ADE06 |
Max and Zack find themselves teaming up with Lydecker after one of their fellow X5 "siblings" is captured by a group hoping to sell Manticore technology to a foreign government. Meanwhile, Normal attempts to sell Jam Pony to a rich Indian financier, and Sketchy and Original Cindy work together to foil the idea.
| 9 | 9 | "Blah Blah Woof Woof" | Paul Shapiro | Moira Kirland Dekker | December 12, 2000 | 1ADE07 |
When Lydecker floods the city with wanted posters of Max, she decides it would be best for everyone if she left Seattle, only to learn that Logan's medical condition has worsened.
| 10 | 10 | "Out" | Sarah Pia Anderson | David Zabel | January 9, 2001 | 1ADE08 |
Max and Logan have a falling out when he stands her up for his Eyes Only work. While the gang at Jam Pony wonders if they should tell Normal his new love interest is a trans woman, Logan is captured by a smuggler demanding to know the identity of Eyes Only.
| 11 | 11 | "Red" | Michael Katleman | Story by : Charles H. Eglee & René Echevarria; Teleplay by : Jose Molina & David Zabel | January 16, 2001 | 1ADE09 |
After Logan sends Max to protect a man testifying against the Mayor, he realizes that the hit men Max is protecting the witness from are really Red Series super-soldiers after her.
| 12 | 12 | "Art Attack" | James Contner | Doris Egan | February 6, 2001 | 1ADE10 |
While attending a wedding with Logan, Max receives a call from Original Cindy asking for help in straightening out a Jam Pony delivery mix-up which has put Normal's life on the line. Logan experiences feeling in his legs.
| 13 | 13 | "Rising" | Duane Clark | Story by : Jose Molina & David Zabel; Teleplay by : Doris Egan & Moira Kirland Dekker | February 13, 2001 | 1ADE11 |
When the Red Series soldiers take Original Cindy hostage, Max risks her own life in order to save the life of her friend- even though it will force her to reveal her hidden past. Max implants herself to become one of the Red Series soldiers because nothing else can kill them. Max almost dies and is saved by Logan. Meanwhile Logan discovers Max's blood transfusion is healing him.
| 14 | 14 | "The Kidz Are Aiight" | Jeff Woolnough | René Echevarria & Charles H. Eglee | February 20, 2001 | 1ADE12 |
Recaptured by Lydecker, Zack is drugged in hopes that he'll reveal the location of the other X5 escapees. Then Zack is set free so he can make contact with an unsuspecting Max, both unaware he has an implant in his ear which will relay every word he says back to Lydecker. Logan uses Eyes Only to send out the message that the X5s' locations have been compromised when they realize they were being listened to.
| 15 | 15 | "Female Trouble" | John Krecthmer | Patrick Harbinson | March 13, 2001 | 1ADE13 |
While investigating a woman doctor who is supposedly helping Logan regain the use of his legs, Max encounters Jace, one of the X5s who chose to remain behind during the Manticore breakout. Jace is pregnant and chooses to escape Manticore and keep her baby. Logan almost commits suicide for fear he might have to go back into a wheelchair.
| 16 | 16 | "Haven" | Michael Rhodes | Jose Molina | March 27, 2001 | 1ADE14 |
An investigation takes Max and Logan to a small town where Max's unexpected seizures leave the wheelchair-user Logan to fight off an attack when a bunch of men try to kill them and a boy that has become close to Max.
| 17 | 17 | "Shortie's in Love" | Paul Shapiro | Adisa Iwa | April 17, 2001 | 1ADE15 |
Max becomes suspicious when Original Cindy's old girlfriend, Diamond, shows up after being paroled from prison and wants to rekindle their relationship.
| 18 | 18 | "Pollo Loco" | Thomas J. Wright | Doris Egan | April 24, 2001 | 1ADE16 |
Max searches for a fellow X5 named Ben (Jensen Ackles) who has been tattooing his barcode onto the necks of his victims then ritualistically killing them and pulling out their teeth for the 'blue lady'.
| 19 | 19 | "I and I Am a Camera" | Jeff Woolnough | David Simkins | May 1, 2001 | 1ADE17 |
Max and Logan team up with a crime fighter with super-human abilities (Rainn Wilson) when they investigate the mysterious deaths of several parolees that leads them right to Logan's family.
| 20 | 20 | "Hit a Sista Back" | James Whitmore, Jr. | Moira Kirland Dekker | May 8, 2001 | 1ADE18 |
Max discovers Lydecker is the least of her worries when she and Zack try to rescue Tinga, a fellow X5 whose genetic makeup allows her to pass X5 traits on to her offspring.
| 21 | 21 | "Meow" | D. J. Caruso | David Zabel | May 15, 2001 | 1ADE19 |
Finding herself in heat again, Max doesn't dare show up for Logan's special anniversary dinner. When she finally does decide to tell Logan how she feels, Zack interrupts with news of Tinga. They go to rescue her, but discover that they are too late as Lydecker has the facility surrounded.
| 22 | 22 | "...And Jesus Brought a Casserole" | Joe Ann Fogle | René Echevarria & Charles H. Eglee | May 22, 2001 | 1ADE20 |
Max holds a dead Tinga in her arms when Donald Lydecker and his troops storm in. However, Lydecker gets double-crossed after Madame X's power play and runs, taking Max with him. Max easily over powers him and gets his help in destroying the DNA lab at Manticore. During the escape from Manticore, Max gets shot and Zack gets captured. Zack shoots himself in the head to provide an X5 donor heart for Max.

=== Season 2 (2001–02) ===
| No. overall | No. in season | Title | Directed by | Written by | Original release date | Prod. code |
|---|---|---|---|---|---|---|
| 23 | 1 | "Designate This" | Jeff Woolnough | Moira Kirland Dekker | September 28, 2001 | 2ADE01 |
Once again a prisoner of Manticore, Max plans an escape with the help of her "breeding partner", Alec (Ben's twin), and a human-canine experimental creature named Joshua.
| 24 | 2 | "Bag 'Em" | Vern Gillum | Marjorie David | October 5, 2001 | 2ADE02 |
Lydecker warns Logan to keep Max away from Manticore even as Max tracks down the young recruits who escaped the same night she caused Manticore's self-destruction.
| 25 | 3 | "Proof of Purchase" | Thomas J. Wright | Tommy Thompson | October 12, 2001 | 2ADE03 |
As Alec is recaptured by Manticore and Joshua begins hunting for his "father", Lydecker seemingly disappears after discovering a secret archaeological dig at an Indian burial site.
| 26 | 4 | "Radar Love" | Jeff Woolnough | Michael Angeli | October 26, 2001 | 2ADE04 |
When a deadly disease outbreak in the International District is connected to a badly disfigured transgenic sighted in the area, Max and Logan must race against time to find the real source of the outbreak before anti-transgenic hysteria grips the city.
| 27 | 5 | "Boo" | Les Landau | Charles H. Eglee & Moira Kirland Dekker | November 2, 2001 | 2ADE05 |
Max is in for a crazy Halloween night when she has to deal with a group of transgenics trying to stop one of their own from assassinating a visiting dignitary, as well as try to keep Joshua from sneaking out on the one night he can roam around without attracting attention.
| 28 | 6 | "Two" | Allan Kroeker | Jose Molina | November 9, 2001 | 2ADE06 |
Max has her hands full when Alec gets a job at Jam Pony in order to case potential robbery targets and Joshua's "man-dog" brother Isaac begins attacking and killing cops. Meanwhile, Alec is threatened by a cyborg street gang called the Steelheads after they find out he's been dealing drugs in their territory.
| 29 | 7 | "Some Assembly Required" | Nick Marck | Robert Doherty | November 16, 2001 | 2ADE07 |
Believing Zack killed himself when they were captured by Manticore, Max is shocked to see him on some security footage sporting numerous cybernetic implants and robbing an electronics store with the Steelheads.
| 30 | 8 | "Gill Girl" | Bryan Spicer | Marjorie David | December 7, 2001 | 2ADE08 |
Max, Alec and Logan do battle against Manticore clean-up operation head Ames White after a mysterious girl with gills is pulled out of the sea by a group of fishermen.
| 31 | 9 | "Medium Is the Message" | Jeff Woolnough | Michael Angeli | December 14, 2001 | 2ADE09 |
Max and Logan discover that genetic breeding has gone on for generations after being contacted by a woman asking for help in finding her six-year-old son.
| 32 | 10 | "Brainiac" | Stephen Williams | Chip Johannessen | January 11, 2002 | 2ADE10 |
While investigating the arrest of an S1W cell with the help of a Manticore escapee able to predict the future, Max begins to suspect Logan has fallen in love with Asha, one of S1W's leaders.
| 33 | 11 | "The Berrisford Agenda" | Thomas J. Wright | Moira Kirland Dekker | January 18, 2002 | 2ADE11 |
Alec goes with Max on a Jam Pony run and is stunned when they make a delivery to a mansion where he went undercover for Manticore- and ended up causing the death of a girl he loved.
| 34 | 12 | "Borrowed Time" | David Straiton | Jose Molina | February 1, 2002 | 2ADE12 |
To pay for a cure that will allow her and Logan to be together, Max agrees to break into the vault where the surviving footage of Star Wars: Episode VII was stored after the pulse shut down filming. Joshua encounters the deadly Manticore creation called Gossamer.
| 35 | 13 | "Harbor Lights" | Kenneth Biller | Robert Doherty | February 8, 2002 | 2ADE13 |
Ames White closes in on Max after she stumbles into a police shoot-out and ends up in the hospital where the virus in her blood is detected, leading to a CDC quarantine.
| 36 | 14 | "Love in Vein" | David Grossman | Michael Angeli | March 8, 2002 | 2ADE14 |
While Alec secretly has Joshua deliver his Jam Pony packages, Max encounters a group of teenage gang members who are under the spell of a transgenic who makes them drink his blood.
| 37 | 15 | "Fuhgeddaboudit" | Morgan James Beggs | Julie Hess | March 15, 2002 | 2ADE15 |
Max, Alec and Logan begin experiencing strange memory lapses while trying to get a mob accountant for a crime syndicate to rat on his boss, and soon learn that the accountant's girlfriend is a Manticore transgenic with the ability to manipulate people's minds.
| 38 | 16 | "Exposure" | Stephen Williams | Moira Kirland Dekker | March 22, 2002 | 2ADE16 |
Max and Logan finally trace Ames White's son to Brookridge Academy only to find him involved in a mysterious cult ceremony taking place in a temple on school grounds. Meanwhile, Sketchy gets a job photographing suspected transgenics for a tabloid newspaper, and ends up taking a picture of a transgenic.
| 39 | 17 | "Hello, Goodbye" | Jeff Woolnough | Story by : Jose Molina & Cindi Grossenbacher; Teleplay by : Jose Molina | April 5, 2002 | 2ADE17 |
While Joshua befriends a blind girl named Annie, Alec is arrested for a murder committed by his twin Ben, and Logan nearly dies after accidentally touching Max, leading her to decide she needs to break up with him for his protection.
| 40 | 18 | "Dawg Day Afternoon" | Kenneth Biller | Robert Doherty | April 12, 2002 | 2ADE18 |
With the television full of news reports about dangerous transgenics, a lonely Joshua is quickly spotted when he leaves his house in search of his friend Annie.
| 41 | 19 | "She Ain't Heavy" | Allan Kroeker | Michael Angeli & Robert Doherty | April 19, 2002 | 2ADE19 |
White uses Max's clone to track her down as increased tensions force Logan to flee from his apartment forever, Max to leave Seattle and Joshua to make his way to a place where transgenics don't have to hide – Terminal City.
| 42 | 20 | "Love Among the Runes" | James Whitmore, Jr. | Jose Molina & Moira Kirland Dekker | April 26, 2002 | 2ADE20 |
As Logan sets up a new Eyes Only location in Joshua's old house, ancient writings appear on Max's arm, then quickly spread to cover her whole body.
| 43 | 21 | "Freak Nation" | James Cameron | Story by : James Cameron & Charles H. Eglee; Teleplay by : Ira Steven Behr & René Echevarria | May 3, 2002 | 2ADE21 |
The gang at Jam Pony find out Max and Alec are transgenics after a young X6 and a pregnant X5 take cover inside the building and an angry mob and police gather outside. The Conclave sends elite warriors the 'Phalanx' after Max.
