= List of Dark Angel characters =

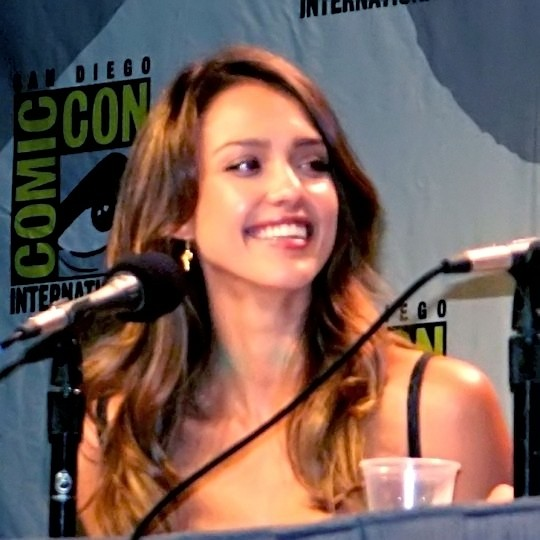
Jessica Alba (pictured in 2007) portrayed Max Guevara, the protagonist of the series

Dark Angel is an American television series created by James Cameron and Charles H. Eglee. The series premiered in the United States on the Fox network on October 3, 2000. Max Guevara, portrayed by Jessica Alba, is the protagonist of the series. The first season had an additional seven regular characters. Two of these characters, Kendra Maibaum and Herbal Thought, did not return for the second season, and a third main character, Colonel Donald Michael Lydecker, was written out of the show shortly into the second season. Four new characters, however, become regulars for the series second and final season.

The series was continued with three canonical novels; "Skin Game" picks up directly where season two ended, and was followed by the final media in the Dark Angel universe, "After the Dark". A prequel novel, "Before the Dawn", chronicles Max's life between escaping from Manticore, the government facility that created her, and the beginning of season one of the television series. An apocryphal Dark Angel video game adaptation features the series' characters Max Guevara, Logan Cale and Original Cindy.

== Main characters ==
=== Max Guevara / X5-452 ===
Max Guevara (portrayed by Jessica Alba and Geneva Locke as Young Max (seasons 1–2)) is the main character in all Dark Angel media. She is a genetically enhanced transgenic super-soldier who escaped from Manticore, the government facility that created her and gave her the signalled code (X5-452). She can be identified by the bar code on the back of her neck, which reads the number 332960073452.

=== Logan Cale / Eyes Only ===
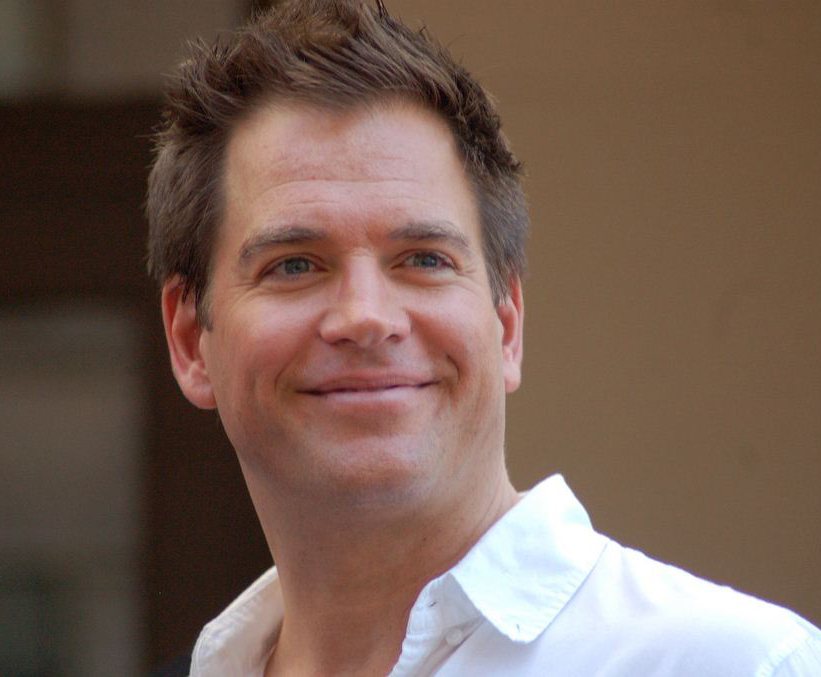
Michael Weatherly (pictured in 2012) portrayed Logan Cale

Logan Cale (portrayed by Michael Weatherly (seasons 1–2)) is a cyber-journalist who uses his knowledge of computer technology to bring down the corrupt power brokers of the new millennium. Heir to a family fortune, Logan hacks into television cable networks and delivers his broadcast entitled Streaming Freedom Video under the pseudonym and alter ego "Eyes Only". When he discovers Max trying to burgle his apartment, Logan notices her Manticore barcode and offers to help her locate the other Manticore children in return for helping him on a vigilante mission. Max denies his offer, and Logan is rendered a paraplegic after he is shot on the mission. Max later accepts Logan's original offer, and the two form a close friendship and romantic interest. After receiving a blood transfusion from Max, Logan temporarily regains the ability to walk due to her stem-cell enriched blood.

Logan is a minor character in the prequel novel, Before the Dawn, after he recruits the X5 Seth to work for him. He is a major character in the novels Skin Game and After the Dark and the video game adaptation (voiced by Weatherly), where he continues to assist Max and the transgenics in the same way he did during the series. After the Dark, the final Dark Angel story, ends with Logan and Max finally consummating their relationship.

=== Colonel Donald Michael Lydecker ===
Colonel Donald Michael Lydecker (portrayed by John Savage (season 1, recurring season 2)) is one of Manticore's senior officers and the main antagonist of the first season. He repeatedly attempts to recapture Max and the other X5s. After he is betrayed by his boss Renfro, Lydecker switches sides and helps Max and Logan prepare to destroy Manticore. He becomes a valuable ally in the fight against Manticore but disappears under mysterious circumstances early in season two.

Lydecker is a major antagonist in Before the Dawn. He only resurfaces in the final chapter of "After the Dark", where it is revealed he has been held prisoner by the breeding cult. When Max discovers him she initially decides to leave him there to die, but when Lydecker promises to help her find her mother if she saves his life Max reluctantly agrees.

=== Cynthia "Original Cindy" McEachin ===
Cynthia "Original Cindy" McEachin (also known as O.C.; portrayed by Valarie Rae Miller (seasons 1–2)) is Max's best friend and a coworker at Jam Pony, where she frequently covers for Max, allowing her to keep her job. In the middle of season one, she discovers that Max is an escaped supersoldier from Manticore and, after some debate, becomes her roommate. At the start of season two, O.C. learns that Logan is Eyes Only. She usually refers to herself in the third person. Despite being a lesbian, multiple sources commented on the fact O.C. was never shown kissing another woman during the first season, (though she later did in the episode "Shortie's in Love") with Miller saying "The censors watch me more than anything". In 2009 AfterEllen ranked her at No. 6 on their list of the Top 11 Lesbian/Bi Sidekicks.

O.C first meets Max in the prequel novel Before the Dawn, when Max comes to her aid during a bar fight. She is a main character in Skin Game, where she is kidnapped by a transgenic serial killer, and also has a minor role in After the Dark, where she continues to be one of Max's closest friends. She also appears as a non-playable character in the Dark Angel video game, where she is voiced by Debbie Timmis.

=== Reagan "Normal" Ronald ===
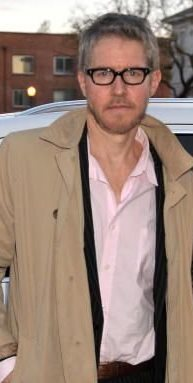
J. C. MacKenzie (pictured in 2014) portrayed Normal, the manager of Jam Pony Express

Reagan "Normal" Ronald (portrayed by J. C. MacKenzie (seasons 1–2)) runs the Jam Pony Express courier service and is nicknamed Normal because his conservative attitude clashes with his somewhat anarchic surroundings. He is a hard taskmaster, often annoyingly saying "Bip, bip, bip!" to mean "hurry!" In addition to disliking and being disliked by most of his workers, he becomes anti-transgenic in the second season after the existence of Manticore's creations becomes public. However, Normal dotes on Alec and calls him his "golden boy", unaware that he is a transgenic. In the series finale, he skillfully helps an X-5 deliver her baby and later completely changes his opinion on transgenics.

Normal is described in Before the Dawn, when Max begins working at Jam Pony. Normal makes an appearance in After the Dark when Max visits Jam Pony. Max is pleasantly surprised at Normal's change in attitude, when he shows compassion for both her and O.C.

=== Calvin Simon "Sketchy" Theodore ===
Calvin Simon "Sketchy" Theodore (portrayed by Richard Gunn (seasons 1–2)) is Max's friend and coworker at Jam Pony. Described as a "hapless" character, Sketchy often found himself in trouble and needing Max's assistance. In the second season he gets a second job as a freelance journalist and attempts to photograph transgenics, taking a dislike to them in the process. After learning that Max and Alec are transgenics during the Jam Pony siege, Sketchy changes his mind and helps the transgenics escape to Terminal City.

Sketchy briefly appears in Before the Dawn, when Max becomes friends with him after she begins working at Jam Pony. Sketchy also plays a minor role in the final two Dark Angel novels. In Skin Game, at the suggestion of Logan, Sketchy leaves Terminal City to become a pro-transgenic reporter for a tabloid newspaper, and is shown to have succeeded in doing so in the sequel After the Dark.

=== Herbal Thought ===
Herbal Thought (portrayed by Alimi Ballard (season 1)) is another of Max's friends and coworkers at Jam Pony. A heavily accented Rastafarian and marijuana enthusiast, Herbal was said to be an "urban philosopher" who "offered wise counsel" to Max. His character does not appear in season two, and no explanation is given for his disappearance.

Herbal briefly appears in Before the Dawn, when Max becomes friends with him after she begins working at Jam Pony.

=== Kendra Maibaum ===
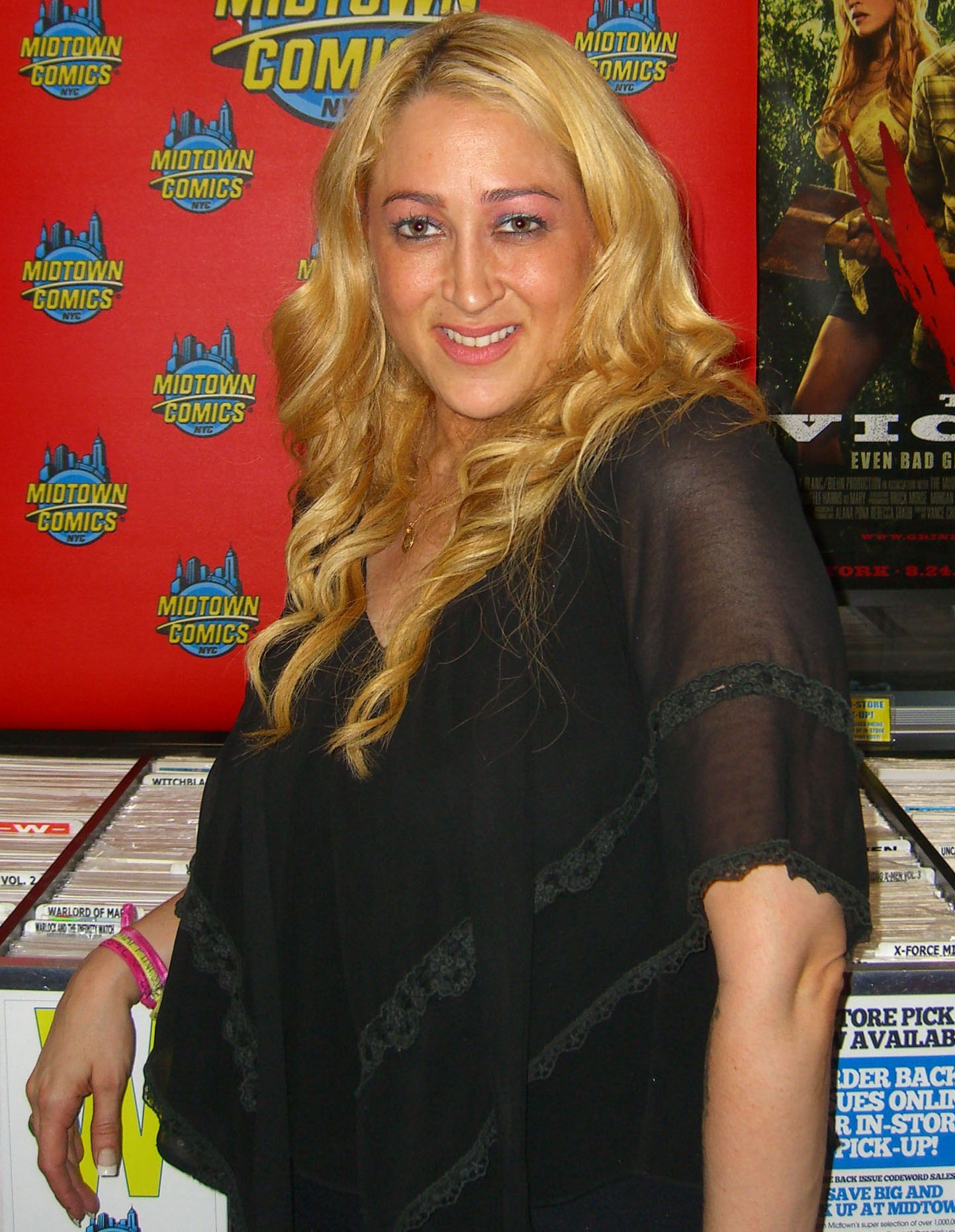
Jennifer Blanc (pictured in 2012) portrayed Kendra Maibuam, who was a regular character in the first season

Kendra Maibaum (portrayed by Jennifer Blanc (season 1)) is Max's friend and roommate for season one. Her life "revolves around dating, going out, partying and dressing up." Her character moves out of Max's apartment during season one to go and live with her boyfriend and subsequently disappears from the show.

Max first meets Kendra in Before the Dawn. After Max defends Kendra from her boss who was sexually harassing her, Kendra offers to let Max, who is looking for a place to live, become her roommate.

=== Alec McDowell/X5-494 ===
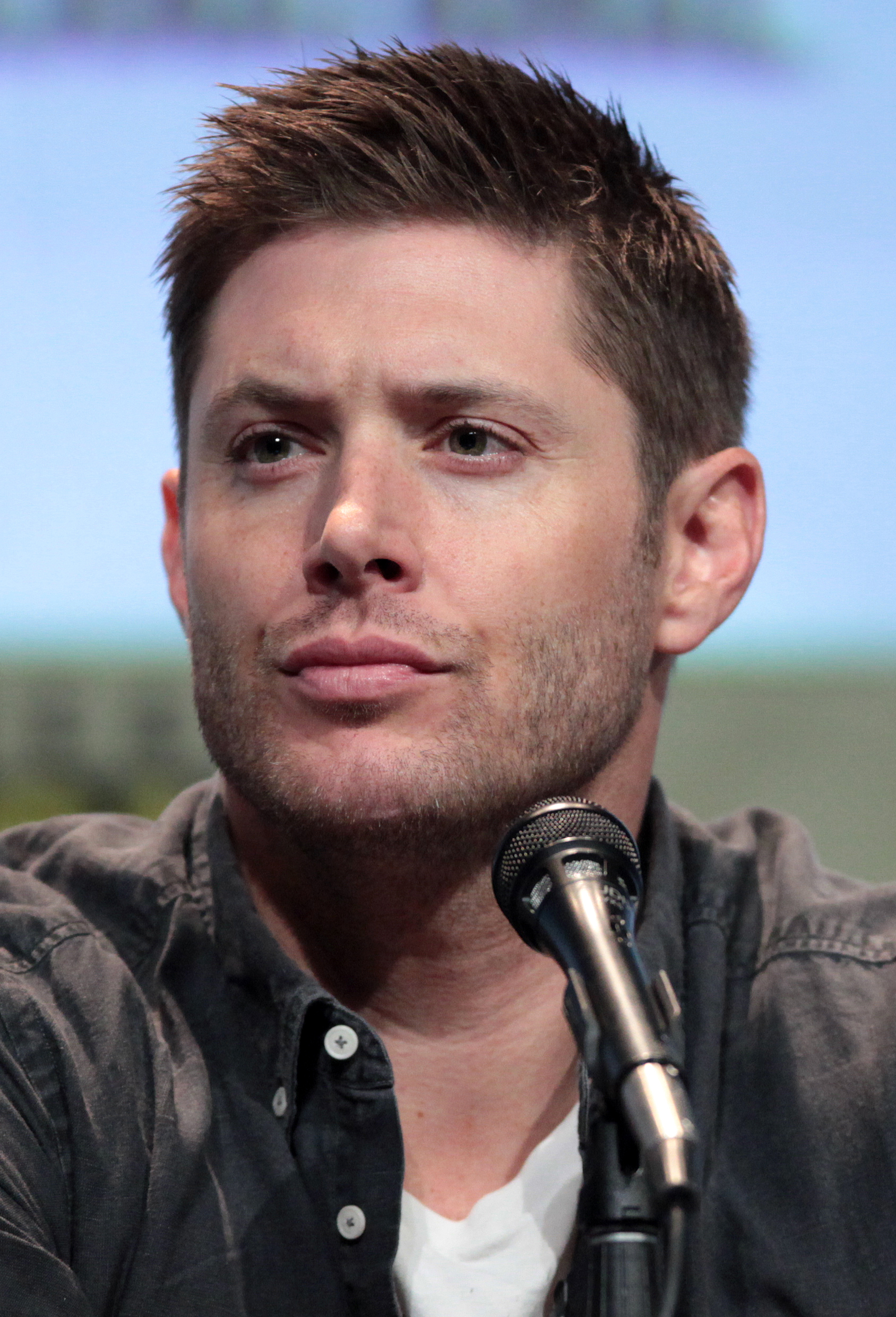
Jensen Ackles (pictured in 2015) portrayed the characters Ben and Alec

Alec McDowell (portrayed by Jensen Ackles (season 2)) is named by Max (for him being a "smart aleck"). He is introduced as Max's breeding partner at Manticore, an order which is vehemently denied by Max. Alec is also the identical twin of Ben / X5-493, one of the original 12 escapees from Manticore. Ben (who was also portrayed by Ackles) appeared and was killed in the season one episode "Pollo Loco", and Max finds Alec's resemblance to him difficult to handle at first. When Manticore is destroyed, Alec escapes to the outside world. A genetically enhanced super-soldier, he makes money using questionable means, while wheeling and dealing. However he often follows Max's example, working at Jam Pony, and being a cat burglar. Alec often presents a cavalier attitude to the world while hiding his darker emotions. He is at first a self-absorbed magnet for trouble, but becomes a valuable ally for Max, and eventually, her friend.

Alec is a main character in the final two Dark Angel novels, continually assisting Max as one of her most trusted allies.

=== Joshua ===
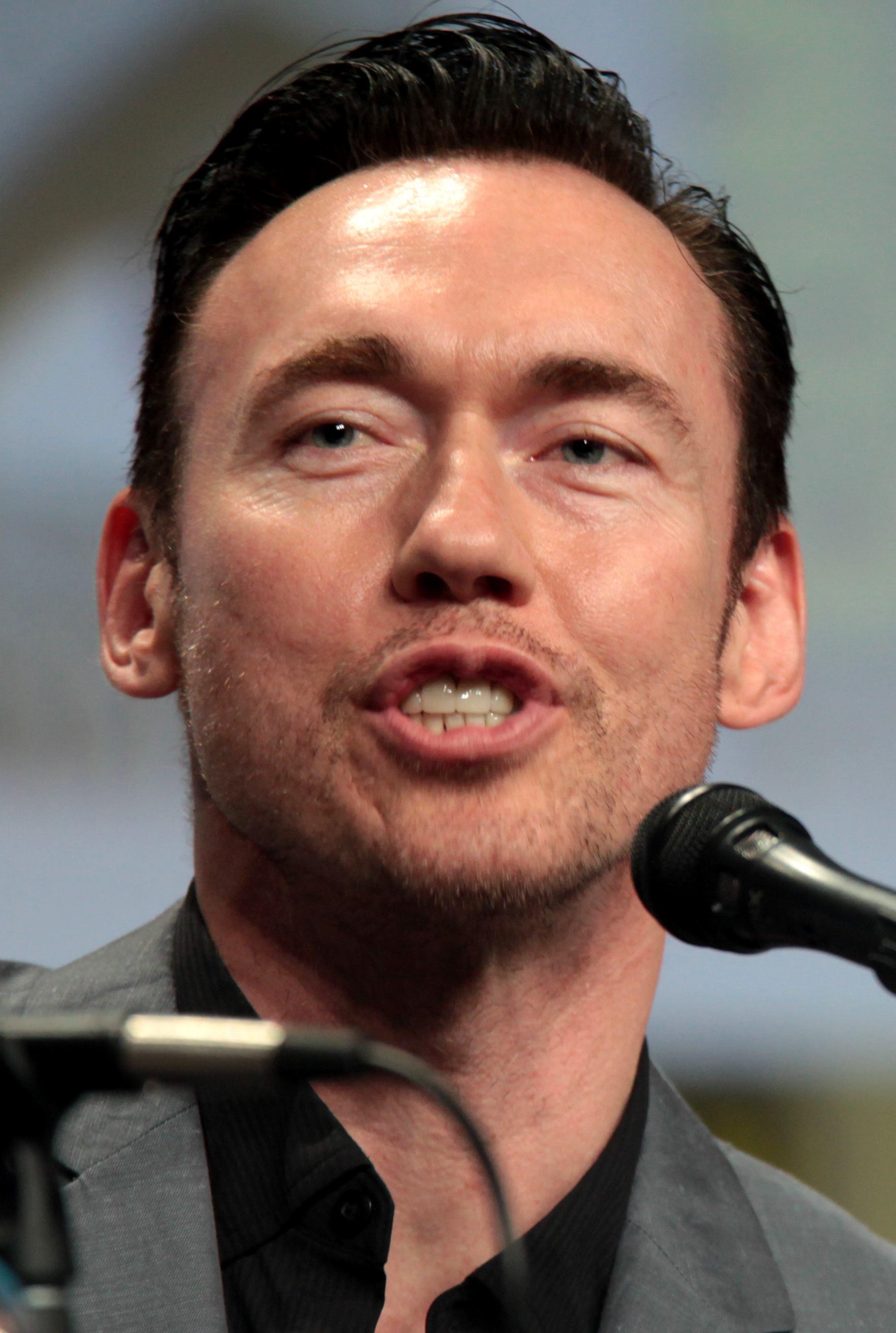
Kevin Durand wore heavy make-up to portray Joshua, who had distinct canine facial features

Joshua (portrayed by Kevin Durand (season 2)) is an early Manticore experiment who's engineered with canine DNA and consequently has some unusual facial features, as well as incredible strength even by transgenic standards. As the very first successful Manticore creation, he has no bar code. At Manticore, he often roams in the basement unchecked, and takes care of the rest of the "downstairs people" by giving them food. He and Max develop a very close friendship, and he often imitates some of the words she says, because of his unfamiliarity with normal speech. His beastly appearance causes the team to seek creative ways to hide him from public view. He has a brief romance with a blind woman named Annie Fisher before Agent White murders her and frames Joshua for it. His enormous strength also helps turn the tide during the battle with the cult members at the Jam Pony siege in the series final episode.

Joshua is a main character in the final two Dark Angel novels, continually assisting Max as one of her most trusted allies.

=== Ames White ===
Ames White (portrayed by Martin Cummins (season 2)) was the second season's primary nemesis of Max. He is a government agent charged with tracking down and exterminating Manticore escapees in order to conceal the organization's existence. He is also part of an ancient cult, known only as the "Conclave", that has infiltrated various levels of society, and over millennia, bred super-humans that are formidable fighters equal to most of the results of the Manticore projects.

White plays the main antagonist in the final two Dark Angel novels. Joshua kills him by ripping off his head towards the conclusion of "After the Dark".

=== Asha Barlow ===
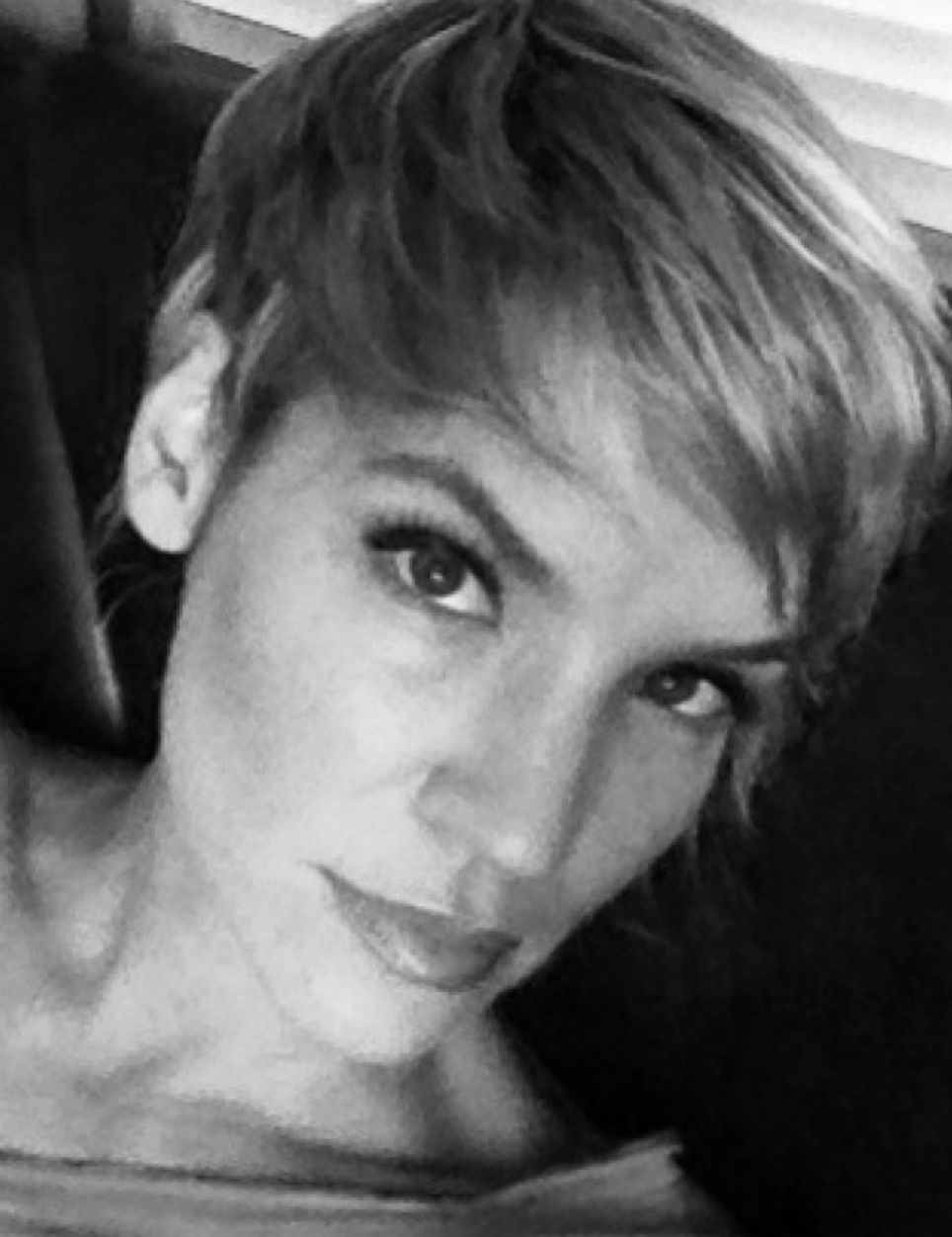
Ashley Scott plays Asha Barlow, an ally of Logan and romantic competition for Max

Asha Barlow (portrayed by Ashley Scott (season 2)) is a member of S.1.W., a militant resistance movement against government corruption. She works closely with Logan on Eyes Only missions but does not know Logan is Eyes Only. She believes, like Det. Matt Sung and most other Eyes Only contacts, that Logan is a messenger for him. Asha has a romantic interest in Logan. She and Alec also almost sleep together in one episode, but nothing comes of it.

Asha makes a brief appearance in the novel After the Dark, where she gives Max some vital information to assist her in rescuing Logan.

== Recurring characters ==
=== Bling ===
Bling (portrayed by Peter James Bryant (seasons 1–2, 14 episodes)), Logan's live-in physical therapist, assists him when he becomes disabled and needed to use a wheelchair, up until he meets Phil (Rainn Wilson), in the episode "I and I Am a Camera", who provides him with an exoskeleton allowing him to walk.

=== Det. Matt Sung ===
Det. Matt Sung (portrayed by Byron Mann (seasons 1–2, 8 episodes)) is Logan's trusted police contact who often provides information or otherwise aids him. Matt Sung appears in both seasons in a recurring role.

=== Zack / X5-599 ===
Zack (portrayed by William Gregory Lee (seasons 1–2, 8 episodes)) is Max's unit leader at Manticore, and it was his idea to escape from the facility. He is very protective of his fellow escapees, especially Max, and does not trust regular humans. He more than often expresses dislike of Max's close bond with Logan Cale. Zack originally returns to Max's life by getting a job at the Jam Pony. Zack leaves Seattle, though returns in need of Max's help several times. In the episode "And Jesus Brought a Casserole" he shoots himself in the head in order to provide Max, who needs a heart transplant to survive, with his heart. He is shown in flashbacks of Max's memories when she reflects on her losing him. However, he returns in the episode "Some Assembly Required" where he is shown to have the damaged part of his skull repaired with machine parts. He has completely lost his memory, though after seeing Max and spending time with her, he gradually begins to regain his memory. However, as he has flashes of intimate memories of hugging Max or being close to her, he falls under the impression they were romantically involved. When he attempts to kiss Max, she rejects him and this brings flashes of Max kissing Logan back to him. Certain Logan is the problem, he goes after Logan, but is prevented from killing him when Max interferes and electrocutes him. Logan's doctor contact studies him and informs them that his memory has been wiped clean again, but they cannot chance him trying to hurt Logan, or the same situation will play out again. Max is forced to let him go. Zack wakes up in a hospital, with a man sitting at his bedside who claims to be Zack's employer at a farm. The farmer offers to take Zack home for a hot meal. Zack agrees, not remembering, but accepting this is what his life was before the "accident". While leaving the hospital, he stops and stares at Max who is sitting in the waiting room. He asks if he knows her, but she says no, and he is wheeled off for the new, normal life he always wanted.

=== Dr. Elizabeth Renfro ===
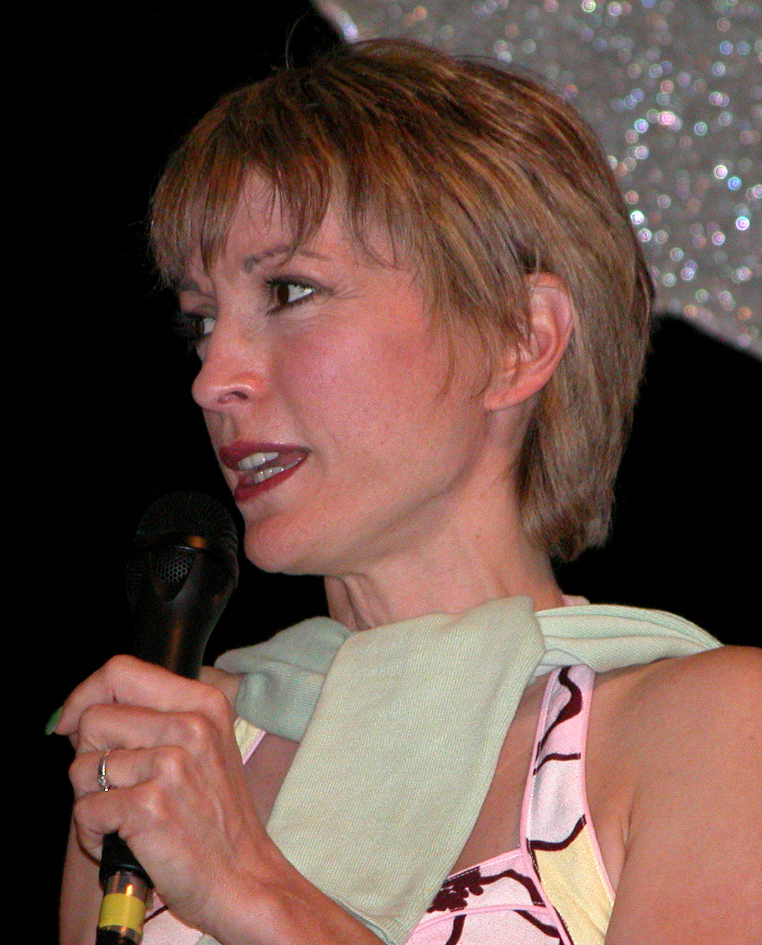
Nana Visitor portrays Dr. Elizabeth Renfro, an antagonist who dies saving Max's life

Dr. Elizabeth Renfro (portrayed by Nana Visitor (season 1–2, 6 episodes)) is Lydecker's superior at Manticore. Renfro is involved in a power struggle with Lydecker, whom she eventually betrays. Renfro captures Max, though Logan subsequently exposes Manticore to the world, and Renfro decides to torch the facility in an attempt to cover up the evidence. While the facility burns Renfro is killed when she jumps in front of Max to keep her from being shot by a Manticore guard. While she is dying Renfro explains she saved her life because Max is "special", and tells her to find Sandeman; Sandeman is later revealed to be the creator of Manticore.

=== Sebastian ===
Sebastian (portrayed by Jade C. Bell (season 1, 5 episodes)) is Logan's friend and a mute quadriplegic who communicates via a machine that verbalizes his thoughts. He is a conspiracy theorist and technological genius who helps Max and Logan solve mysteries through the use of computer technology.

=== Luke ===
Luke (portrayed by Fred Ewanuick (season 2, 5 episodes)) is a failed transgenic experiment, living in Terminal City. He is described as having "a cue ball for a head, red bags under his eyes, and huge flaps over his ears." Along with Dix, he works in Terminal City's communications and technical area, and is also a skilled computer hacker.

Luke makes several appearances throughout the final two Dark Angel novels, continually assisting Max as one of her most trusted allies.

=== Dix ===
Dix (portrayed by Darcy Laurie (season 2, 5 episodes)) is a failed transgenic experiment, living in Terminal City. He is described as having "a face like a pile of lumpy mashed potatoes and a half-assed goggle-cummonicle strapped to his one good eye."

Dix makes several appearances throughout the final two Dark Angel novels, continually assisting Max as one of her most trusted allies.

=== Tinga / Penny Smith / X5-656 ===
Tinga (portrayed by Lisa Ann Cabasa (season 1, 4 episodes)) is another of the original 12 escapees from Manticore. She manages to assimilate into normal society, marry Charlie Smith (Sebastian Spence), have a child named Case, and work in a bakery. In "The Kidz are Alright", she escapes to Canada with Zack, returns for her family in "Hit a Sista Back", and is then captured by Manticore in exchange for her son's return. Her capture and death has a very strong influence in Lydecker's decision to defect from Manticore.

=== Mole ===
Mole (portrayed by Brian Jensen (season 2, 4 episodes)) is a transgenic of reptilian appearance designed for desert combat. He is brave but also impulsive, and is rarely seen without a cigar in his mouth. Assisted by Joshua, Mole was attempting to transport two transgenics to Terminal City when he crashed into a truck that backed out in front of his vehicle. Forced to flee on foot from a transgenic hating mob, the four transgenics sought refuge at Jam Pony, though were followed by the police, leading to the Jam Pony siege.

Mole plays a main character in the final two Dark Angel novels, continually assisting Max as one of her most trusted allies.

=== Dan Vogelsang ===
Dan Vogelsang (portrayed by Stephen Lee (season 1, 4 episodes)) is a private detective; it is revealed Max has hired him to help locate Hannah, the woman who rescued her when she escaped from Manticore. Vogelsang succeeds in locating Hannah.

Vogelsang appears in Before the Dawn; Max meets him when she delivers him a package. After learning that he a private detective she hires him to locate both Hannah and her brother Seth. Vogelsang discovers that someone else (later revealed to be Lydecker) is also looking for Seth, though has no other information on Seth or Hannah at the time.

=== Raymond "Ray" White ===
Raymond "Ray" White (portrayed by Brayden Bullen (season 2, 2 episodes)) is Ames' son who is kidnapped by the Familiars, a breeding cult that put him through a mysterious ceremony to see if he will survive exposure to a potentially lethal pathogen for 'the coming'. Ray's immune system kicks in with the right antibodies, and he survives. Max rescues him, and Logan arranges for Ray to be placed in a secure environment away from the Familiars. This causes Ames, deprived of his son, to increase his hostility towards Max.

Ray is murdered in "After the Dark" by a rival member of Ames White's breeding cult, partially as he believes White and his family have brought nothing but failure to the cult, and partially to lure Max to the breeding cult's headquarters in order to have her killed.

=== Annie Fisher ===
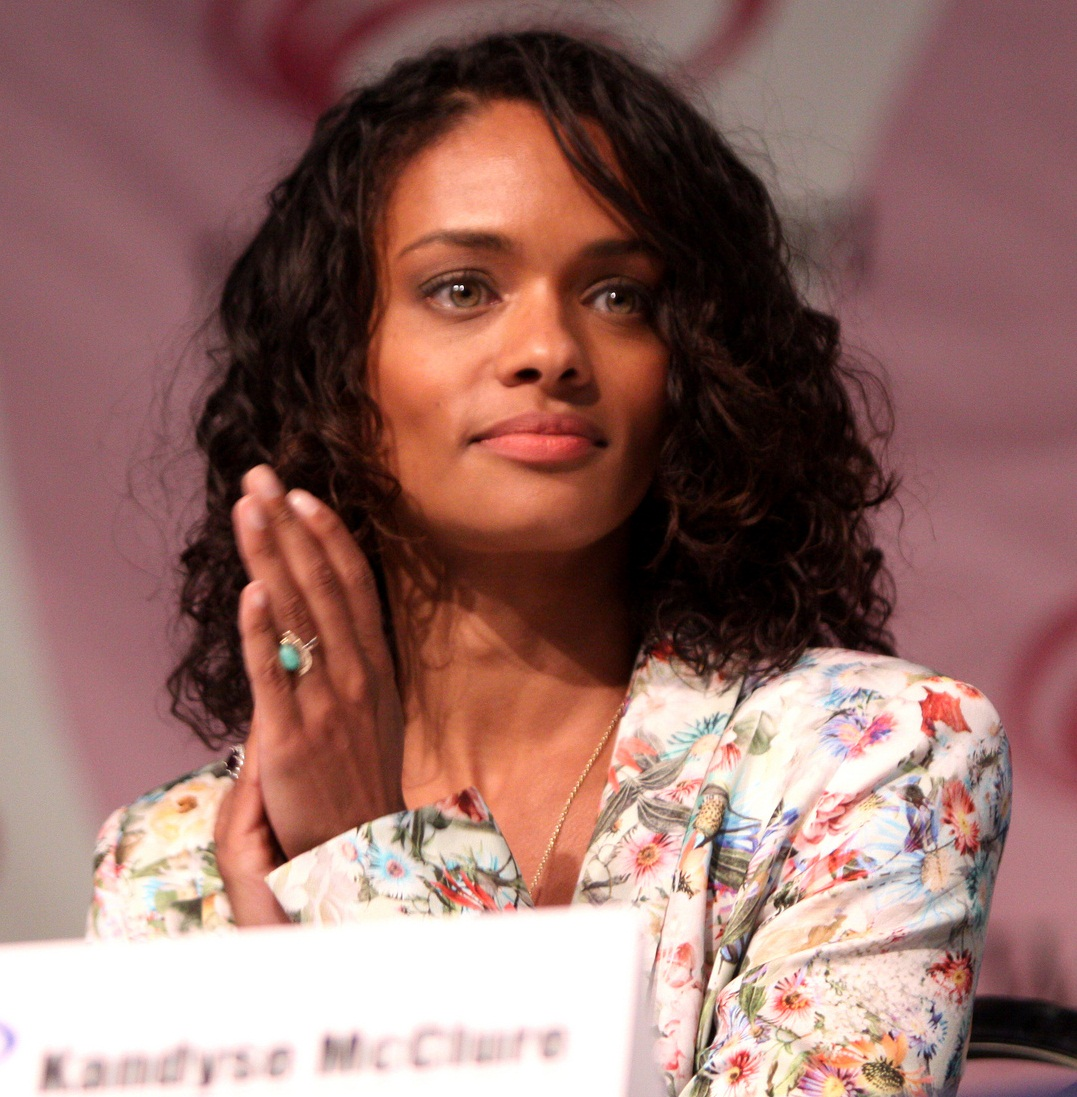
Kandyse McClure portrayed Annie Fisher, Joshua's love interest

Annie Fisher (portrayed by Kandyse McClure (season 2, 2 episodes)) is Joshua's short-lived romantic interest. The two meet when Joshua is on his porch due to fleas in his house and they have a conversation after Joshua realizes that she is blind. As the two began getting close, Alec convinces Joshua that it is dangerous for him to continue to see Annie, and he reluctantly ends the relationship with her. Annie wishes to feel Joshua's face in order to "see" him before he leaves, so he has Alec stand in for him.

They meet up again later while Joshua is being chased by vigilantes, and he leads her into the sewer where he is forced to tell her the truth about himself. Although she is initially upset, Annie later feels Joshua's face in order to perceive what he really looks like and understand why he lied to her. She tells him to escape and leave her behind, and that she will tell the police he went in a different direction. Unfortunately, Ames White finds her and snaps her neck to frame Joshua for murder.
