= Steeven Petitteville =

French cinematographer

Steeven Petitteville is a French cinematographer.

He has worked with directors Phil Joanou, Logan Kibens, Benjamin Rocher, Maurice Barthelemy, Vernie Yeung and Franck Khalfoun among others and has accompanied various artists, writers and choreographers such as Youssef Nabil, Bret Easton Ellis, Benjamin Millepied, William Forsythe, John McIlduff and Brian Irvine on their directorial debuts and later work.

Steeven is a member of the French Society of Cinematographers (AFC).

== Filmography ==
- Feature films

- Smoke Signals directed by Antoine Raimbault (Fr)
- Night of the hunted directed by Franck Khalfoun (US)
- Terror on the Prairie directed by Michael Polish (US)
- Operator directed by Logan Kibens (US) visions selection at SXSW festival 2016 South by Southwest
- The Veil directed by Phil Joanou (US)
- Good Take (the Solitudes segment) directed by Vernie Yeung (HK)
- Stroller Strategy directed by Clément Michel (Fr)
- Behold the Lamb directed by John Mcilduff (UK)
- Low Cost directed by Maurice Barthélemy (Fr)
- Babies directed by Thomas Balmès (Fr) (doc)

- TV

- Lucky Luke directed by Benjamin Rocher Disney +
- Iris directed by Doria Tilier (Fr) Canal Plus
- On the Verge directed by Julie Delpy (US) Netflix
- The deleted directed by Bret Easton Ellis (US)
- Crime d'État directed by Pierre Aknine (Fr)

- Art pieces

- Morning Vegas by Kourtney Roy
- Chaconne by Benjamin Millepied (Dance)
- Alignigung by William Forsythe
- I saved my belly dancer by Youssef Nabil
- Motion Sickness by Jessica Kenedy & John McIlduff (Dance)
- The Mysterious art of dancing by John McIlduff

== Awards ==
London director's talents 2025

- Best cinematography

New York best film awards 2024

- Best cinematography

Lion king international film awards 2024

- Best cinematography

Cinema Odyssey 2024

- Best cinematography

US international film and video festival 2016:

- Gold camera Best cinematography / BMCE "let's dream of a new world" - Steeven Petitteville:

Film moves Belfast Film Festival 2013 short film Awards:

- Best cinematography / Motion sickness - Steeven Petitteville / For over coming the problems of interpreting "the stage" with shots that challenged the audience at nearly every angles
- Best art in film / Motion sickness / Engrossing Choreography and performance realised through challenging photography
