= Age 7 in America =

1991 American documentary film

- Genre: Documentary; Biography
- Directed by: Phil Joanou
- Narrated by: Meryl Streep
- Country of origin: United States
- Original language: English

Production
- Executive producer: Michael Apted
- Producer: Vicky Bippart
- Cinematography: Peter Gilbert
- Editor: Mona Davis
- Running time: 120 minutes
- Production company: Granada Television

Original release
- Release: 1991

Age 7 in America is a 1991 American documentary film produced by Michael Apted, co-produced by Vicky Bippart, directed by Phil Joanou, and narrated by Meryl Streep. It details the lives of seven-year-old Americans from across the continental United States, of varying social classes and ethnicities. Patterned after the British Up series, further installments of the series were made, showing the children at age 14, and again at 21. These installments are titled 14 Up in America (1998, also directed by Joanou and produced by Vicky Bippart) and 21 Up in America (2006, directed by Christopher Dillon Quinn and produced by Vicky Bippart).

CBS Television and Granada Television won a Peabody Award in 1992 for Age 7 in America.

== The children ==
- Luis lives in New York City's Lower East Side. He lives in a homeless shelter.
- Lucy, Alexis, and Kate are affluent and white, living in New York City's Upper East Side and attending the prestigious Nightingale-Bamford School.
- Ashtyn is white and lives in a middle-class suburban neighborhood in Lincoln, Nebraska.
- LeRoy lives in an apartment building (part of the Robert Taylor housing project) in the South Side of Chicago. He is African American.
- Kennisha is LeRoy's classmate and has lived in the housing project for the first part of her life but moved away later. She is also African American.
- Douglas, Vicky, and Mike live in a traditionally working-class, Polish community in Chicago. They are white and attend a private Catholic school.
- Eric lives in a wealthy Chicago suburb. He is white, and an only child.
- Brandon, a friend and classmate of Eric, also lives in a wealthy suburb. They go to a prep school on the University of Chicago's campus. Brandon is Black or Mixed Race. ( as Brandon refers to himself as descended from people who had been enslaved in the United States)
- Joey lives in rural Georgia and is a white Jehovah's Witness.
- Edie also lives in rural Georgia, and is African American.
- Salina lives in Los Angeles, and is the daughter of Chinese and Vietnamese immigrants.
- Julio came to Los Angeles from El Salvador and lives in a Spanish-speaking household.
- Michael lives in a beachside community of Los Angeles, descended from Japanese immigrants.
