= Babies (2010 film) =

- United States theatrical release poster
- Directed by: Thomas Balmès
- Produced by: Alain Chabat
- Starring: Ponijao; Bayar(jargal); Mari; Hattie
- Cinematography: Jérôme Alméras; Frazer Bradshaw; Steeven Petitteville
- Edited by: Reynald Bertrand; Craig McKay
- Music by: Bruno Coulais
- Production companies: StudioCanal; Chez Wam
- Distributed by: StudioCanal
- Release dates: 7 May 2010; 16 June 2010 (France)
- Running time: 79 minutes
- Country: France
- Languages: English; Japanese; Mongolian; OtjiHimba

Babies, also known as Baby(ies) and Bébé(s), is a 2010 French documentary film by Thomas Balmès that follows four newborns through their first year after birth. Two of the babies featured in the film are from rural areas: Ponijao from Opuwo, Namibia, and Bayarjargal (Bayar) from Bayanchandmani, Mongolia, and two are from urban areas: Mari from Tokyo, Japan, and Hattie from San Francisco, U.S. The film was released in the United States by Focus Features on 7 May 2010.

== Summary ==
The documentary opens showing how Ponijao comes into the world in a modest hut as her mother rubs red ochre all over her pregnancy-swollen belly. Hattie, on the other hand, is shown in a Western NICU surrounded by medical equipment and technicians. Another scene shows Bayar being born and tightly swaddled in a hospital, before heading off with his parents and a sibling on a motorcycle to the rural area where the family lives. Other highlights include Mari's tantrum when she is frustrated with a toy, Hattie getting bored during an organized play session, Bayar taking a bath while a goat comes to drink from the same water, and Ponijao fighting with a sibling when they are playing on the ground.

The documentary shows the contrasts of the four cultures without using any form of narration, leaving it to the viewers to interpret the film.

== Reception ==
Babies received generally positive reviews. 69% of ninety-one reviews on the site Rotten Tomatoes favored the film. The site's consensus is that "Babies is a joyous celebration of humankind that's loaded with adorable images, but it lacks insight and depth." The film received a score of sixty-three on Metacritic. Owen Gleiberman, a reviewer for Entertainment Weekly, called Babies a crowd-pleaser and gave it a "B". Katey Rich of Cinema Blend called the film "brilliantly simple".

== Box office ==
The film had its widest US release in 543 theaters, grossing $7,320,323 at the box office. It grossed $2,898,983 at the foreign box office; a worldwide gross of $10,219,306.
