= James Cameron's Dark Angel =

2002 video game

- Developer: Radical Entertainment
- Publishers: Sierra Entertainment; Fox Interactive
- Producer: Jeffrey Kearney
- Designers: David Seymour; Mike Inglehart
- Writer: Jeff Houde
- Composer: Graig Robertson
- Platforms: PlayStation 2, Xbox
- Release: NA: November 19, 2002; EU: February 21, 2003
- Genre: Beat 'em up
- Mode: Single-player

James Cameron's Dark Angel is a beat 'em up video game based on the television series Dark Angel. It was developed by Radical Entertainment and co-published by Fox Interactive and Vivendi Universal Games through their subsidiary Sierra Entertainment. It was announced at the Electronic Entertainment Expo in May 2002, shortly after the TV series was canceled. Jessica Alba and Michael Weatherly reprised their roles from the series, voicing Max Guevara and Logan Cale respectively.

The game follows an original storyline, with players controlling Max Guevara as she fights the I Corporation and attempts to find her twin sister. It was released on PlayStation 2 and Xbox in November 2002. The game was met with generally unfavorable reviews. It was frequently criticized for its unoriginality, repetition and certain gameplay issues, though some praised its graphics, storyline and voice acting.

== Gameplay ==
Max may kickflip off walls over enemies to evade or attack them from behind.

Dark Angel is a single-player beat 'em up game played from a third person view. Players take control of Max Guevara, a genetically-enhanced super soldier. Levels involve fighting enemies while following a fairly straightforward path to the level's exit. Max attacks enemies using various punches, kicks and throws, and can also utilize the environment to perform actions, such as kickflipping off a wall then attacking an enemy from behind. She can also perform moves like back flips and side twirls to evade enemies. Occasionally Max may have to interact with the environment to advance past a point, such as placing an explosive on a door, though what is required to progress through the level is clearly highlighted to the player. Max receives communications from Logan Cale, who offers his advice on how she may reach objectives. The game also presents 'stealth mode' sequences during some levels. In stealth mode, Max can distract enemies by making noise or perform stealth kills by sneaking up on them. If Max is spotted during stealth mode, a timer is activated and additional enemies begin to appear. If she has not reached the exit or killed the enemies when the timer has run out, the level must be restarted. Boss enemies are present in some levels.

== Plot ==
Dark Angel follows an original storyline that takes place after the destruction of the headquarters of Manticore, an organization which creates genetically-enhanced super soldiers, at the beginning of the TV series' second season. Seattle has been placed on a curfew as the I Corporation round up the escapees from Manticore. They are particularly interested in capturing super soldier Max Guevara. Max evades and fights I Corporation through the streets of Seattle as she returns to her apartment. After battling opponents in her apartment lobby, Max learns that her friend and flatmate Original Cindy has been captured by the sector police. After defeating the police and rescuing Original Cindy, Max goes to meet her friend and ally, cyber-journalist Logan Cale at his apartment. Outside the apartment complex she defeats an I Corporation genetically engineered boss character named Beetle. Meanwhile, a cloaked figure murders a police officer at the scene and steals his vehicle. Logan informs Max that he has received an email from someone named Sylan who claims that Max has a twin sister. He traces the email to an I Corporation research lab named Tritech. Max tells Logan that Sylan was one of the child soldiers at Manticore, and that she stayed behind in order to help Max and eleven of her siblings escape. Max proceeds to Tritech to find her.

Max infiltrates the Tritech facility and defeats guards as well as a genetically engineered boss named Gekko. Then, she witnesses the cloaked figure kill a Tritech employee before capturing Sylan. Max continues her pursuit across a fortified bridge and a dockyard. Logan's research discovers Sylan is being held prisoner on a ship; Max enters the Marine Control Centre, the main headquarters of the I Corporation's offshore business operations, in order to learn which ship Sylan is on. Max boards the ship Stella Nova after learning that Sylan is aboard. Max rescues Sylan following a confrontation with an opponent disguised as her. Max discovers that her twin sister, Beka, was taken to the I Corporation headquarters years ago, and that an I Corporation scientist, Dr Stephen Van Der Mescht, knows more about her. Logan traces Van Der Mescht to a military train owned by I Corporation.

Max breaks through security at the train yard and boards the train. She locates Van Der Mescht, who initially refuses to help her. After Max threatens him with torture, Van Der Mescht explains that I Corporation was a rival of Manticore, and had a military contract for more aggressive genetic research. They created a 'Y' series of genetically engineered soldiers (as opposed to Manticore's 'X' series); when Max and Beka were born, Beka was taken by I Corporation so that the two different series could be compared. I Corporation guards ambush the room, killing Van Der Mescht before he can divulge more. I Corporation send a single soldier, a transgenic boss named Bear, to kill Max. Bear is defeated, and Max reaches the I Corporation headquarters with the train. Max fights her way to the upper level of the headquarters, defeating guards and the boss characters Beetle, Gekko and Bear again, before she confronts Beka. Beka reveals that she now controls the I Corporation, and has engineered a younger replacement to succeed her using the DNA that she and Max shares. She tries to recruit Max to join her and their 'younger sister' in creating a new generation of genetically engineered soldiers. Max refuses and Beka attacks her. After killing Beka, Max tries to rescue her younger sister. The cloaked figure, whose identity is never revealed, tries unsuccessfully to stop her. Logan arrives in a helicopter and rescues Max and her younger sister from the complex. Later, while sitting on the roof of the Space Needle, Max laments that knowing the truth about Beka is worse than not knowing at all, but is determined to create a positive life for herself and her younger sister. A post-credits scene shows Max and Original Cindy dancing in their apartment.

== Development and release ==
Dark Angel was announced in May 2002 at the E3 Expo, shortly after the TV series was canceled. It was reported the game would feature the likeness of characters from the show as well as the voices of Jessica Alba and Michael Weatherly, reprising the roles of Max Guevara and Logan Cale respectively. Fox Interactive producer Chris Miller said the game would "give consumers a chance to virtually play as Max in her next adventure to find her sister and fellow genetically engineered escapees." It was developed by Radical Entertainment and published by Sierra Entertainment; it was released in North America on November 19, 2002. Due to the termination of the TV series, Radical Entertainment slashed the game's budget during development. The game contains an exclusive photo gallery of Jessica Alba, cast interviews and other bonus features. A trailer for the video game was included in the season one DVD of the Dark Angel TV series.

== Reception ==
Reception

Aggregate score
Aggregator	Score	
Aggregator	PS2	Xbox
Metacritic	48/100	47/100

Review scores
Publication	Score	
Publication	PS2	Xbox
AllGame	N/A	2.5/5
Electronic Gaming Monthly	N/A	6/10
Game Informer	5.25/10	N/A
GamePro	3/5	N/A
GameRevolution	D+	D+
GameSpot	3.8/10	3.8/10
GameSpy	N/A	2/5
GameZone	5.1/10	5/10
IGN	4/10	3.9/10
Official U.S. PlayStation Magazine	2/5	N/A
Official Xbox Magazine (US)	N/A	4.5/10

Dark Angel received "generally unfavorable reviews" on both platforms according to the review aggregator Metacritic. The game was frequently criticized for its unoriginality, repetition and problems with its stealth mode, though it received some praise for its graphics and voice acting, as well as its story and setting.

Brett Todd of GameSpot criticized the stealth mode, noting many blind spots, problems with the camera angles and that enemies could be killed in plain view of each other without attracting their attention, concluding "Overall, sneaking around involves more pure chance than skill." He considered the game's story and setting to be its one redeeming feature, saying it stayed faithful to the television series. Scott Alan Marriott of AllGame highlighted controls, camera angles and above average graphics as the game's strengths, although lamented its repetitive nature, "inconsistent level design and challenge" and lack of two-player support. Zach Meston of GameSpy criticized the game's ease, lack of strategy, and the fact that solutions to the game's 'puzzles' were clearly highlighted to the player.

Miss Spell of GamePro praised the graphics, voice acting and hand-to-hand combat. However, the game's stealth mode was described as "comically maddening", and logical errors, such as Max's ability to jump seven feet-high despite her inability to climb over a knee high fence, were also discussed. The review concluded that it "isn't a bad game, but it's not a really good game either, it's caught somewhere in between, struggling for a clear identity." Duke Ferris of Game Revolution said, "It's not that Dark Angel is brutally awful or full of bugs ... it's that it lacks any originality whatsoever. It's a boring, repetitive cookie-cutter game straight from the Nabisco ovens. You've eaten this cookie many times before; and if you're old enough, the first time it was called Streets of Rage."
