= Operator (2016 film) =

- Directed by: Logan Kibens
- Written by: Sharon Greene; Logan Kibens
- Produced by: Aaron Cruze; Logan Kibens
- Starring: Martin Starr; Mae Whitman; Nat Faxon; Cameron Esposito; Retta; Christine Lahti
- Cinematography: Steeven Petitteville
- Edited by: Logan Kibens
- Music by: Sage Lewis
- Production companies: Cruze & Company; June Pictures
- Distributed by: The Orchard
- Release dates: March 12, 2016 (South by Southwest); November 8, 2016
- Running time: 91 minutes
- Country: United States
- Language: English

Operator is a 2016 American comedy-drama film directed by Logan Kibens from a screenplay by Sharon Greene and Logan Kibens. It stars Martin Starr as Joe, a programmer and obsessive self-quantifier, and Mae Whitman as Emily, a budding comedy performer, who are a happily married couple until they decide to use one another in their work. Nat Faxon, Cameron Esposito, Retta, and Christine Lahti co-star. The film had its world premiere at the SXSW Film Festival on March 12, 2016 and was released by The Orchard on November 8, 2016.

== Plot ==
Joe (Martin Starr) is a programmer with a crippling anxiety problem who is unable to deal with uncertainty. At work he is tasked with creating an interactive call center answering machine that can convey empathy. Joe recruits his wife Emily (Mae Whitman) who has the perfect voice for the system. Emily works at the front desk of a swanky hotel during the day and has an uncanny ability to soothe even the most irate guests (at night she performs with a comedy group at the Neo-Futurists). After years of being happily married, the pressures of work, family, and personal growth have strained their relationship. Emily sees this as an opportunity to reinvigorate their marriage and agrees to participate. What begins as a collaboration to strengthen their relationship quickly spirals out of control. Terrified of the uncertainty in their relationship, Joe becomes obsessed with creating the “perfect” version of his wife, becoming detached from the real Emily as he spends sleepless nights programming his automated Emily to fulfill his needs for sex and companionship. While Joe is losing touch with reality, Emily is losing faith in their future together. Joe will have to relinquish control and face the uncertainties of life if he wants to save their marriage.

== Cast ==
- Martin Starr as Joe Larsen
- Mae Whitman as Emily Klein
- Nat Faxon as Gregg
- Cameron Esposito as Chloe Johnston
- Retta as Pauline "Roger" Rogers
- Christine Lahti as Beth Larsen

== Production ==
Operator began filming in Chicago on June 29, 2015.

== Release and reception ==
The film premiered to positive reviews at the South by Southwest festival on March 12, 2016. On May 25, 2016, it was announced that The Orchard had acquired distribution rights to the film.

On review aggregator Rotten Tomatoes, the film holds an approval rating of 100% based on 6 reviews, with an average rating of 7.19/10.
