= Behold the Lamb =

2011 Northern Irish film

- Theatrical film poster
- Directed by: John McIlduff
- Written by: John McIlduff
- Produced by: Kevin Jackson
- Starring: Aoife Duffin; Nigel O'Neill; Rosemary Henderson
- Cinematography: Steeven Petitteville
- Edited by: Nick Emerson
- Music by: Brian Irvine
- Release date: April 14, 2011 (Belfast)
- Running time: 85 mins.
- Country: United Kingdom
- Language: English

Behold the Lamb is a 2011 Northern Irish drama film, directed and written by John McIlduff. It stars Aoife Duffin, Nigel O'Neill, and Rosemary Henderson. It premiered at the Belfast Film Festival in 2011.

== Synopsis ==
Behold the Lamb is darkly comic road movie that follows Eddie, a fifty year old overweight and depressed accountant and Liz, a young tearaway and recovering drug addict as they travel across Northern Ireland to pick up a lamb.

== Cast ==
- Aoife Duffin as Liz
- Nigel O'Neill as Eddie
- Shaun Paul McGrath as Barry
- Rosemary Henderson as Ivy
- Mickey Mason as Joe

== Reception ==
Alissa Simon of Variety lauded how John McIlduff's film was "executed in a talky, darkly humorous manner that recalls the impudent, poetic styles of John Michael and Martin McDonagh". Barbara Rowland of Student Film Reviews praised the "respected performances" of leads Aoife Duffin and Nigel O'Neill. Meanwhile, Riley Haas of Letterboxd had a mixed take, rating the film 3/5 stars but opining that the "characters are unlikable" and if it were an American—not Irish—film, it'd be "accompanied by a quirky score".
