= The Veil (2016 film) =

American supernatural horror film

- Official poster
- Directed by: Phil Joanou
- Written by: Robert Ben Garant
- Produced by: Jason Blum; Robert Ben Garant
- Starring: Jessica Alba; Lily Rabe; Aleksa Palladino; Reid Scott; Thomas Jane
- Cinematography: Steeven Petitteville
- Edited by: Paul Norling
- Music by: Nathan Whitehead
- Production company: Blumhouse Productions
- Distributed by: Universal Pictures
- Release date: January 19, 2016 (U.S.)
- Running time: 93 minutes
- Country: United States
- Language: English
- Budget: $4 million

The Veil is a 2016 American supernatural horror film directed by Phil Joanou and written by Robert Ben Garant, and starring Jessica Alba, Lily Rabe, Aleksa Palladino, Reid Scott, and Thomas Jane. Jason Blum served as a producer through his production company Blumhouse Productions. The film was released on January 19, 2016, through video on demand prior to being released through home media formats on February 2, 2016, by Universal Pictures.

== Plot ==
25 years after the mass suicide of the religious cult Heaven's Veil, documentary filmmaker Maggie Price and her brother Christian contact the sole survivor, Sarah Hope, to film a documentary about what really happened. Sarah, who was five years old at the time, accepts Maggie's claim that there is footage from the suicide that has never been found. Christian explains that their father was the FBI agent who led the investigation. Shortly after discovering the mass suicide, he committed suicide himself, driving the siblings to investigate.

Maggie takes Sarah to the site of the cult's suicide. They shoot footage of Sarah's reaction and are concerned when she collapses, overwhelmed by memories and visions. After setting up camp for the night, Sarah wakes from a nightmare to find that the grip, Ed, has disappeared with their van. Ann, the sound editor, and Nick, the gaffer, leave to find Ed. The others follow Sarah, who has remembered the location of a house in the forest. Inside, they find the lost footage and missing cult member Karen Sweetzer's corpse. In a tape found near her body, Karen briefly addresses Sarah before dying.

The group watches the lost tapes, in which Jim Jacobs, the quasi-Christian occultist leader of Heaven's Veil, describes how he uncovered the secret to eternal life though alchemy. They learn that Karen is Sarah's mother. Ann and Nick return, revealing that Ed has died in a car accident. Later tapes depict Jim experimenting with dangerous drugs to help him cross over to the spirit realm. During one trance, he possesses a cult member and announces that he has freed the first of three bindings from her soul. Ghosts kill and possess Nick when he leaves to restart the house's generator; he rejoins the others and kills Ann when they are alone. Nick and Ann, now possessed, return together to continue watching the tapes. In the tapes, Jim poisons himself during further experiments, removing the second binding from his soul, then returning once an antidote is applied to him.

After hearing ghostly whispers, the remaining filmmakers become convinced that the house is haunted. Jill, the sound editor, and Matt, the cameraman, find Ed alive but injured. Ed kills Jill, and they return to the house. Sarah holds a seance to communicate with her mother, who demands that she convince the filmmakers to stay at the house. Ann murders Christian, who rises and joins her. Everyone but Maggie and Sarah are now possessed.

In the final reel, Jim reveals that the poison administered to the cult members was supposed to be counteracted by the antidote. Karen objects to poisoning the children and allows Sarah to flee. Jim is revealed to be Sarah's father and forces Karen to take the poison. Karen leaves with the footage for the house, where she dies. Before the cult can administer the antidote to themselves, the FBI arrive and interrupt the ceremony. Denied the antidote, the cult members all die.

Sarah reveals that the ghosts of the cult members have possessed the documentary filmmakers. Jim, possessing Ed, nails Maggie to a tree despite her protests that her father did not know about the antidote. The police arrive with Matt, only to be killed and possessed as well. Jim announces his plan to feed upon the souls of the rest of the world.

== Cast ==
- Jessica Alba as Maggie Price
- Lily Rabe as Sarah Hope
- Thomas Jane as Jim Jacobs
- Ivy George as Little Sarah
- Aleksa Palladino as Karen Sweetzer
- Reid Scott as Nick
- Shannon Woodward as Jill
- Jack DeSena as Christian Price
- Meegan Warner as Ann
- Lenny Jacobson as Ed
- David Sullivan as Matt
- Amber Friendly as Sam
- Jim Storm as Dan Wheeler
- Kira McLean as Lucia Sara's sister

== Production ==
Originally, the film was supposed to be found footage. When the team felt found footage had run its course, Robert Ben Garant re-wrote his script to make it more traditional. In February 2014, Thomas Jane joined the cast of the film. Director Phil Joanou and Jane had collaborated on the short film The Punisher: Dirty Laundry, and Joanou offered the role to Jane. Jane rewrote most of his character's dialogue to convert him from a fundamentalist Christian to an occultist. Jane's rewrites included twenty pages of more material, most of which was shot and subsequently edited down. Jane was inspired by religious leaders Jim Jones and David Koresh, but he also mixed in elements of a rock star.

Also in February, it was announced that Jessica Alba and Lily Rabe joined the cast. Alba had worked with producer Jason Blum on Stretch in a cameo, and Blum wanted to give her a larger role. She was previously attached to the film when it was still in the found footage format, and Joanou had to repitch the film to her once it was rewritten. April 2014, Reid Scott and Meegan Warner joined.

Shooting took place over 25 days. Joanou said the conversion from found footage format left him little time to complete the film, as the scenes became necessarily more complex. Joanou called it his most difficult shoot.

== Marketing and release ==
In February 2014, it was announced that Universal Pictures would be distributing the film, a part of their first-look deal with Blumhouse Productions. In January 2016, Collider released the first images from the film, as well as the trailer and three posters for the film.

=== Critical response ===
Ken W. Hanley of Fangoria described the premise – that Jim Jones could have been right – as intriguing, but he said the rest of the film does not live up to the premise. Citing Jane's acting, Hanley concluded, "Overall, even if it doesn't fully connect, The Veil is an ultimately-fascinating horror effort that is worth a watch." Staci Layne Wilson of Dread Central rated it 3/5 stars and wrote, "The Veil could have been a truly-scary supernatural thriller about the power of a collective consciousness, but instead it's just a halfway-decent time waster that's mostly memorable for Jane's performance."

Jim Hemphill of Filmmaker praised the film as "one of the best American suspense thrillers of the last ten years."

=== Home media ===
The film was released in the United States on January 19, 2016, through video on demand and Netflix prior to being released on home media formats on February 2, 2016. The film was released direct-to-DVD in Canada on February 2, 2016, and in the United Kingdom on April 4, 2016. Kino Lorber released it on Blu-ray on November 3, 2020.
