= Max Guevara =

Main protagonist of Dark Angel

- Dark Angel character
- Jessica Alba as Max
- First appearance: "Pilot"
- Last appearance: "Freak Nation"
- Created by: James Cameron; Charles H. Eglee
- Portrayed by: Jessica Alba Other: Geneva Locke (child)

In-universe information
- Aliases: X5-452; Rachel Glasser
- Species: Genetically engineered super soldier, X5
- Gender: Female
- Significant other: Logan Cale

Max Guevara (X5-452) is a fictional character and the protagonist of the cyberpunk science fiction television program Dark Angel. During both seasons of the series, Max was portrayed by Jessica Alba; Geneva Locke played the character during flashbacks to her childhood. Over one thousand actresses were considered for the part of Max before Alba was given the role. Max also appears in three canonical novels based on the series as well as an apocryphal video game adaptation. Created by James Cameron and Charles H. Eglee, Max followed a long line of strong female characters in Cameron's work, including Sarah Connor and Ellen Ripley.

Max is a genetically enhanced transgenic supersoldier, created in a secret government lab known as Manticore. Along with 11 other children, Max escapes from the facility when she is 9 years old. Max attempts to live a normal life while eluding recapture by Manticore. She also searches for other escaped transgenics with the help of Logan Cale, a cyber-journalist also known as "Eyes Only". The character received mostly positive reception from critics, and Alba won several awards for her portrayal of Max. In 2004, Max was ranked at No. 17 in TV Guide's list of the "25 Greatest Sci-Fi Legends."

== Creation and appearances ==
Following his success with the film Titanic, director James Cameron teamed up with Charles H. Eglee. The two formed a production company, Cameron/Eglee Productions, and began working on ideas for a television series, eventually deciding on the idea of Dark Angel. Cameron said they began with the idea that Max would be a genetic construct who appeared normal but was different on a genetic level, saying "We explored what that could mean. Do her eyes look different? Were there things that manifest themselves? Were there negatives to it? We wanted her to have flaws, things that were built in – like Kryptonite." Max followed a long line of strong female characters in films directed Cameron, including Sarah Connor and Ellen Ripley. Cameron believes such characters are well received all round as women respond favourably to strong female characters and male audiences "want to see girls kick ass".

More than one thousand young actresses were considered for the part of Max before Jessica Alba was chosen; Cameron started reviewing audition tapes when it had been narrowed down to 20 or 30 applicants. Cameron said he was not overly impressed with Alba's acting skill or appearance in her audition tape, though he kept coming back and watching it as there was something about her attitude that he liked, eventually deciding he needed to see her in person. Alba was hired for the role before the scripts were written. Eglee said "We had the benefit of being able to write a script kind of backwards, we were writing for this actress, with her cadences and her rhythms and her sensibilities and her attitude and her slang." In order to train for the role, Alba spent a year doing martial arts and gymnastics and riding motorcycles.

Max is the lead character in both seasons of the TV series Dark Angel, where she is portrayed primarily by Alba but also by Geneva Locke as a child in flashbacks. She appears in three original novels based on the series, two of which pick up directly where the series ended and one that serves as a prequel novel, filling in the time between Max's escape from Manticore and the beginning of the first season. Max is also the playable character in the video game adaptation, Dark Angel, where she is voiced by Alba.

== Attributes ==
Max was genetically engineered and carried to term by a woman who was not permitted to meet her. She was created for a secret government supersoldier program called Manticore, then located in Gillette, Wyoming. As with almost all Manticore's soldiers, Max has a barcode on the nape of her neck, with her identifying number sequence (332960073452). She is an X5 model and is thus referred to as X5-452. Designed to be "the perfect soldier," Max is extremely strong, athletic and agile. She can see in the dark, can zoom in with her eyes to view distant objects, does not need to sleep and has a photographic memory. She also has enhanced hearing, can leap up or down from great heights with ease, can hold her breath underwater for extended periods and can dodge bullets with her super speed. Max lies, cheats and steals when she needs to and shows no remorse when doing so, though she is morally opposed to guns. Max rides a Kawasaki motorcycle and enjoys riding at high speed. When she wants to be alone she sits atop of the derelict Space Needle. Max's forms 'family' bonds with her best friend and flatmate Original Cindy, her ally Logan Cale and her fellow X5 escapees. Upon escaping from Manticore, Max chooses the last name "Guevara" for herself.

Max has a genetic flaw that causes her to have seizures, and must take tryptophan to help control them. The seizures played a subplot early in the first season though the issue was phased out without explanation as the series progressed. As a side-effect of having cat DNA, Max goes into heat twice during the first season, though as with the seizures the issue did not re-appear in the second season. In the second season it is revealed that Max has no junk DNA; every one of her DNA sequences has a specific purpose.

== Storyline ==
In 2009 twelve of the X5s, including 9-year-old Max, escape from Manticore into a snowy forest. Max is found and given shelter by Hannah, a sympathetic Manticore nurse. Several months later terrorists detonate an electromagnetic pulse weapon in the atmosphere over the US, destroying all electronic devices in the country and throwing it into chaos and poverty. In the prequel novel, Dark Angel: Before the Dawn, after escaping Manticore, Max makes her way to Casper, Wyoming, where she meets Lucy Barrett, a little girl who helps Max stow away in her mother's SUV. Later, after arriving in Los Angeles, California, Lucy's mother, Joann, agrees to let Max live with them. Max and Lucy endure physical and emotional abuse from Lucy's alcoholic father, Jack. Max runs away from her foster home in 2013 and heads to Hollywood, where she joins the Chinese Clan, a group of thieves taking refuge in the remains of Grauman's Chinese Theatre. In 2019, Max leaves Los Angeles to search for one of her Manticore siblings in Seattle, Washington. While stopping in Eureka, California, Max meets "Original Cindy" McEachin when she comes to McEachin's aid in a bar fight, and the two of them travel to Seattle together. In Seattle, the duo meet Kendra Maibaum, a young woman who offers Max a place to stay after Max defends her from her boss who was sexually harassing her. McEachin and Maibaum feature as regular characters in the TV series.

The TV series begins with Max, now 19, living in a post-apocalyptic Seattle. She lives in fear of Colonel Donald Lydecker, who had been assigned by Manticore to capture Max and the other escapees. Max holds a job as a bicycle messenger for the company "Jam Pony X – Press", and also operates at night as a burglar, explaining, "I steal things in order to sell them for money. It's called commerce." Max is caught by Logan Cale, a vigilante cyber journalist who uses the alias "Eyes Only", while she is attempting to burglarize him. Cale notices and recognizes Max's barcode, and offers to help her locate her Manticore brothers and sisters if she agrees to team up with him. Max initially refuses, but changes her mind after Cale is rendered a paraplegic after he attempts a mission without her assistance. Max spends season one "jugg[ling] 'Eyes Only' missions" while searching for fellow Manticore escapees. A complicated romantic interest develops between Max and Cale.

Near the end of the season, Lydecker is betrayed by his superior, Elizabeth Renfro, and subsequently defects from Manticore. He aids Max in an assault on the Manticore headquarters, though Max is badly wounded and captured. In season two Cale exposes Manticore to the world, and Renfro torches the facility in an attempt to cover up the evidence, though she is killed in the process. Max escapes the facility and frees hundreds of other super soldiers and failed Manticore experiments. Lydecker disappears under mysterious circumstances. National Security Agency agent Ames White, who is also a member of a secretive cult that wishes to eliminate transgenics, is tasked with recapturing the Manticore escapees. Both the authorities and cult members pursue Max, though she escapes to Terminal City, an abandoned part of Seattle where hundreds of outcast transgenics have been hiding. When the police begin to surround Terminal City, Max convinces the other transgenics to stand their ground rather than run. The second and final season ends with the military surrounding and possibly preparing to invade Terminal City.

The novel Dark Angel: Skin Game picks up where season two ends. Reports of a transgenic serial killer in Seattle are exacerbating the stand-off at Terminal City. Max uncovers that the killer's psychosis was caused by him unwillingly being given a psychoactive drug by White. A truce develops between transgenics and the authorities after Max publicly reveals the information, and White goes into hiding. The final novel, Dark Angel: After the Dark, picks up where Skin Game ended. Cale is kidnapped by the cult, who are trying to provoke Max into attacking them. Max eventually leads an assault on the cult's headquarters, which frees Cale and results in White's death and the compound being set on fire. As the headquarters burn Max finds Lydecker in a prison cell, and he promises to help her find her mother if she saves him, to which she agrees. The book ends with Cale and Max finally consummating their relationship.

== Reception ==
Max has been cited as a feminist character and is considered a symbol of female empowerment. Writing for the University of Melbourne, Bronwen Auty considered Max to be the "archetypal modern feminist hero – a young woman empowered to use her body actively to achieve goals", citing Max's refusal to use firearms and instead using martial arts and knowledge as weapons as contributing to this status. Writing in Science Fiction Film & Television, Clarice Butkus noted Max has been considered a "distinctly millennial post-third-wave feminist warrior", and considered Max's relationship and dialogue with Original Cindy, an African American lesbian, to convey female empowerment. For example Cindy encourages Max not to feel guilt over her sexual behaviour and instead to embrace a traditionally masculine approach to sex. Writing in Reconstruction: Studies in Contemporary Culture, Lorna Jowett also considered Max an example of female empowerment, saying she appeared to be the "usual postmodern, postfeminist representation of the female action hero" who displayed mixtures and reversals of traditional gender traits.

The character received mainly positive reviews from critics. In October 2000 Howard Rosenberg commented "If pouty faces and sexy walks could destroy, the highly arresting Max would be wiping out the entire planet. It's actually quite moving. And she looks great on her bike." Hal Boedeker from the Orlando Sentinel gave a positive review of Max, and compared her skills to those of Catwoman, Xena, Emma Peel and Wonder Woman. Time commented favorably on Alba's physical skills portraying Max, though stated she had "an emotional range unusual among action babes." Conversely, Joyce Millman said "Cameron and Eglee give us very little incentive to care about Max as a person, the way we care about Buffy or Faith. And that's because Max is little more than lips and ass and a premise reminiscent of other, better shows." In December 2000 People listed Alba's portrayal of Max as among the breakthrough performances of 2000.

Alba was nominated for several awards for her portrayal of Max. She won "Best Actress on Television" at the 27th Saturn Awards, "Breakout Star of the Year" at the TV Guide Awards, "Outstanding Actress in a New Television Series" at the ALMA Awards and "Choice Actress" at the 2001 Teen Choice Awards. In 2004, Max was ranked at number 17 in TV Guide's list of the "25 Greatest Sci-Fi Legends", and in 2012, Dave Golder from GamesRadar ranked Max at number 49 on his list of the 100 sexiest women in sci-fi.
