= Phil Joanou =

American film director

- Born: November 20, 1961 (age 63); La Cañada Flintridge, California, U.S.
- Occupation: Film director
- Years active: 1984–present

Phil Joanou (born November 20, 1961) is an American director of film, music videos, and television programs. He is known for his collaborations with the rock band U2, for whom he directed music videos and their 1988 documentary film Rattle and Hum.

== Biography ==
Joanou was born in La Cañada Flintridge, California. He began making short films on super-8 when he was 14 years old. Joanou studied at UCLA's theater department and moved on to USC's cinema program. His award winning student film Last Chance Dance caught the eye of Steven Spielberg who hired him to direct two Amazing Stories episodes, "Santa '85" and "The Doll", when he was 23 years old. John Lithgow won a best actor Emmy Award for his role in "The Doll" and memorably said in his acceptance speech: "I'd like to thank the director, Phil Joanou, remember that name."

Spielberg then offered Joanou his first feature film, Three O'Clock High. Filmed in Ogden, Utah, on a five-million-dollar budget, the black comedy was released in 1987. Although the film was not a box-office success in its initial run, it went on to become a cult favorite with a huge following. While in post-production on Three O'Clock High, Joanou was introduced to the Irish rock band U2, and after a series of discussions, they asked him to direct their 1988 film Rattle and Hum. The film chronicled the band's Joshua Tree Tour as they moved across the United States at the end of 1987. Joanou operated the camera for the documentary portion of the shoot and edited over one million feet of film into the final movie. The film divided critics upon release; it premiered in five cities: Dublin, London, Madrid, New York and Los Angeles in a one week period. Joanou's collaboration with U2 continued on for over twenty years with the director shooting nine music videos for the band as well as a documentary ("40 Cents a Day") that covered Bono's journey throughout Africa for One and Project Red. His other collaborations with the band include: "Who's Gonna Ride Your Wild Horses" -- "If God Will Send His Angels" -- "Merry Christmas, Baby Please Come Home" -- "One Tree Hill" -- "When Love Comes to Town" -- "All Because of You" and "Sometimes You Can't Make it on Your Own".

Joanou also collaborated with Tom Petty on two music videos. The first, "You Don't Know How it Feels", won the MTV award for best rock video and the second, "Walls (circus version)" was a part of the "She's the One" soundtrack. He also directed videos for Whitney Houston and Mariah Carey ("When You Believe") as well as Bon Jovi ("Keep the Faith").

After the release of Rattle and Hum, Joanou went on to direct the Irish gangster drama, State of Grace. The film starred Sean Penn, Gary Oldman, Ed Harris and Robin Wright. It was released by Orion Pictures in September 1990, the same week as Martin Scorsese's Goodfellas. The film received positive reviews, but was eclipsed by the Scorsese film.

In 1990, Joanou directed the American version of Michael Apted's British Up documentary series. The original film, as well as this US version, followed a group of seven-year-old children to see how they would evolve over the course of their lives, re-visiting them every seven years. The first installment directed by Joanou, Age 7 in America, was hosted by Meryl Streep and introduced on network television by Oprah Winfrey. It went on to win a Peabody award for best documentary that same year.

In 1991, Joanou directed the psychological thriller, Final Analysis. The film starred Richard Gere and Kim Basinger. The film was shot by Joanou's frequent collaborator Jordan Cronenweth (his last feature film) and featured a reproduction of the interior of the Pigeon Point Lighthouse by the acclaimed production designer Dean Tavoularis. Released in 1992, the film was well received, and opened at number one.

After several brief forays into TV - directing an episode of the mini-series Wild Palms and an installment of the anthology series Fallen Angels - Joanou returned to features with the Alec Baldwin vehicle, Heaven's Prisoners. Based on the James Lee Burke novel of the same name, the film was shot in New Orleans in the summer of 1994. The production was beset by myriad of problems and Joanou was said to be very frustrated by the experience with Savoy Pictures (who financed the film). The company went bankrupt before Joanou was able to complete the movie and the film was released in a compromised state. Both Joanou and Baldwin attempted to raise the funds to "finish the movie right" outside of the studio, but were unable to do so.

After the disappointment of Heaven's Prisoners, Joanou went into the indie world of filmmaking to write, direct, produce and edit Entropy. Produced by Brad Epstein, Robert De Niro, and Jane Rosenthal at Tribeca Films, this semi-autobiographical film (starring Stephen Dorff as the Joanou-inspired character) was independently produced for three million dollars while shooting in New York, Los Angeles, Paris, Dublin and Cape Town. Five U2 songs were used on the soundtrack, and the band also performed live, while Bono and Larry Mullen Jr. played themselves as characters in the film. The film was ultimately purchased by Touchstone Pictures (Disney).

The second installment of the American Up series, 14 Up in America, was completed in 1998 when Joanou filmed the same children, now 14 years old. In 2005, due to a conflict with a feature film Joanou was directing (Gridiron Gang), rather than wait until the Sony film was finished, Granda Television (the producer of the documentary project) chose to move forward with a different director for Age 21 in America. This installment was never aired in the US and the project was abandoned.

In the early 2000s, Joanou focused on commercial work, directing commercials for Nike, Coke, Gatorade, Bud Light, Honda, Ford, GM, Lexus, Brand Jordan, Sony, UPS, Microsoft, EA, Mercedes, Disney, Visa, MasterCard, and many others.

In 2005, Joanou began production on Gridiron Gang, based on the award-winning documentary that followed the first season of the inaugural football program at Camp Kilpatrick, a juvenile detention center in Los Angeles. The film starred Dwayne Johnson and opened number one in 2006 in both its theatrical run and its home video release. Joanou also directed Chris Tucker's first stand-up comedy special for Netflix in 2013, which was released in 2015.

His latest film The Veil (2016), took Joanou into the horror and mystery genre for Blumhouse, Universal Pictures, and Netflix.

In 2023, Joanou released his first novel, It Just Happened, a comedic coming-of-age story set in 1973.

== Filmography ==
=== Film ===
Director

- Last Chance Dance (1984) (student thesis film)
- Three O'Clock High (1987)
- Rattle and Hum (1988)
- State of Grace (1990)
- Age 7 in America (1991) (TV documentary)
- Final Analysis (1992)
- Heaven's Prisoners (1996)
- 14 Up in America (1998) (TV documentary)
- Entropy (1999) (also writer)
- Gridiron Gang (2006)
- The Punisher: Dirty Laundry (2012)
- The Veil (2016)

Writer

- Flight of the Navigator (1986) as "Matt McManus"

=== Music video ===
- "Bad", U2 (1987)
- "One Tree Hill", U2 (1987)
- "When Love Comes to Town" (version 1), U2 & B.B. King (1988)
- "One" (version 3), U2 (1991)
- "Keep the Faith", Bon Jovi (1992)
- "Who's Gonna Ride Your Wild Horses" (version 1), U2 (1992)
- "You Don't Know How It Feels", Tom Petty (1994)
- "Walls (Circus)", Tom Petty and the Heartbreakers (1996)
- "Sharks Can't Sleep", Tracy Bonham (1996)
- "If God Will Send His Angels", U2 (1997)
- "When You Believe", Mariah Carey & Whitney Houston (1998)
- "All Because of You" (version 1), U2 (2005)
- "Sometimes You Can't Make It on Your Own", U2 (2005)

=== Television ===
- "Santa '85", Amazing Stories, Joshua Brand/John Falsey/Steven Spielberg, (1985)
- "The Doll", Amazing Stories, Joshua Brand/John Falsey/Steven Spielberg (1986)
- "Hello, I Must Be Going", Wild Palms, Bruce Wagner (1993)
- "Dead-End for Delia", Fallen Angels, William Horberg (1993)

Comedy special

- Chris Tucker Live (2015)

Other work

- "Nightmare on Dick Street: Part 1" and "Nightmare on Dick Street: Part 2", Third Rock from the Sun, second unit director of 3D dream sequences, (1996)
- It Just Happened novel (2023).
