= Jessica Alba =

American actress (born 1981)

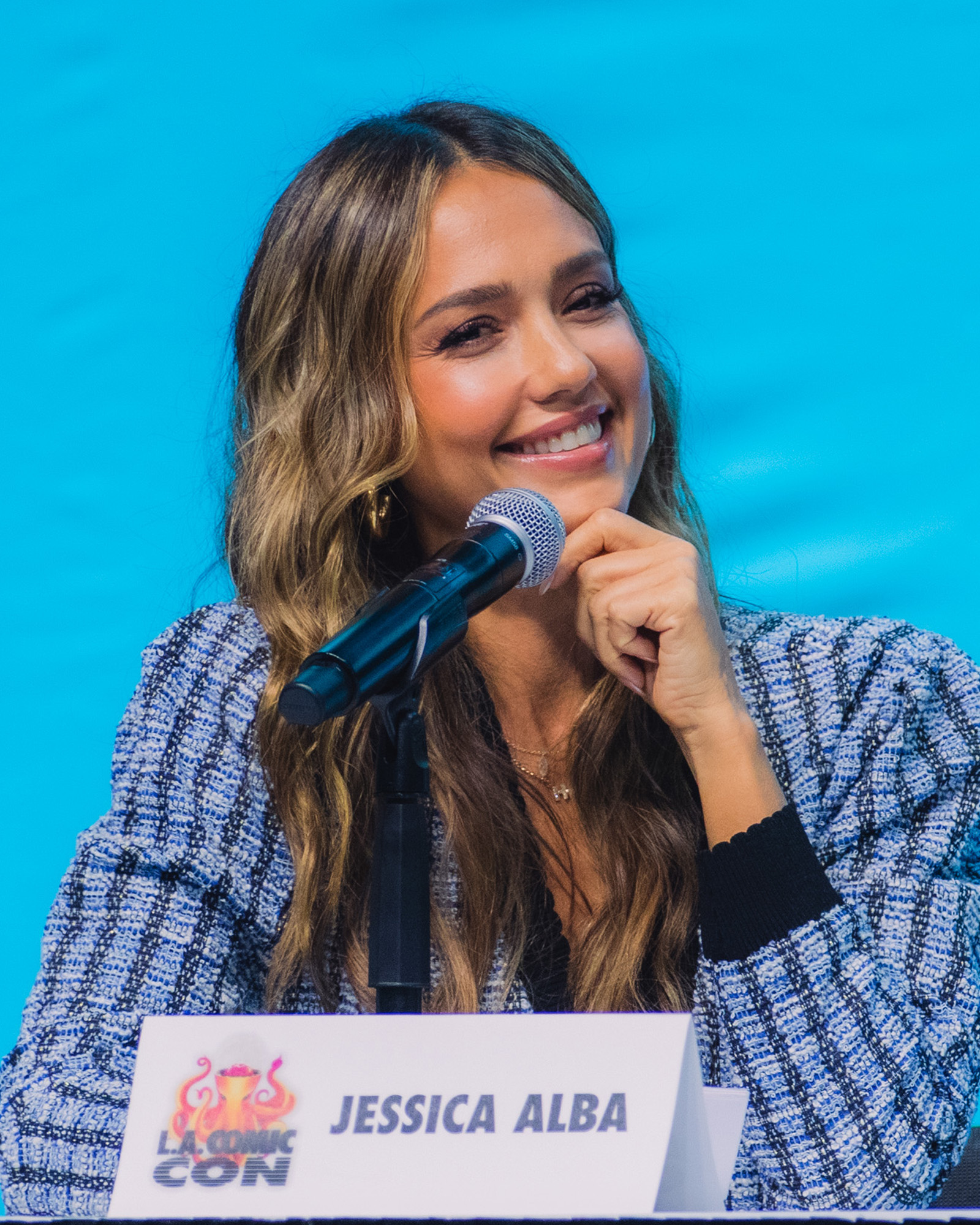
- Alba at the 2025 Los Angeles Comic Con
- Born: Jessica Marie Alba; April 28, 1981 (age 45); Pomona, California, U.S.
- Other name: Jessica Warren
- Occupations: Actress; businesswoman
- Years active: 1992–present
- Spouse: Cash Warren (m. 2008; sep. 2025)
- Partner: Michael Weatherly (2000–2003)
- Children: 3
- Relatives: Gustavo Arellano (third cousin, once removed)

Jessica Marie Alba (/ˈælbə/ AL-bə; born April 28, 1981) is an American actress and businesswoman. She rose to prominence at age 19 for portraying Max Guevara, the lead character in the television series Dark Angel (2000–2002), for which she received a Golden Globe nomination. Her cinematic breakthrough came shortly after with the lead role in Honey (2003).

Alba began her acting career at age 13 in Camp Nowhere, followed by The Secret World of Alex Mack (both 1994). She soon established herself as a Hollywood actress, and has starred in numerous box office hits throughout her career, including Fantastic Four (2005), Fantastic Four: Rise of the Silver Surfer (2007), Good Luck Chuck (2007), The Eye (2008), Valentine's Day (2010), Little Fockers (2010), and Mechanic: Resurrection (2016). She is a frequent collaborator with director Robert Rodriguez, having starred in Sin City (2005), Machete (2010), Spy Kids: All the Time in the World (2011), Machete Kills (2013), and Sin City: A Dame to Kill For (2014). From 2019 to 2020, Alba starred in the Spectrum action crime series L.A.'s Finest.

In 2011, Alba co-founded the Honest Company, a consumer goods company that sells baby, personal, and household products. Based in Los Angeles, the company was valued at roughly $550 million as of February 2022, and currently (as of May 2026) has a valuation of around $380 million. Several magazines, including Men's Health, Vanity Fair and FHM, have included Alba on their lists of the world's most beautiful women.

== Early life ==
Alba was born in Pomona, California, on April 28, 1981, to Catherine Louisa Alba (née Jensen) and Mark David Alba. Her mother has Danish, English, French, German, and Welsh ancestry; while her father is of Mexican descent with small amount of Sephardic Jewish ancestry. She has a younger brother. Her third cousin, once removed, is writer Gustavo Arellano. Her father's Air Force career took the family to Biloxi, Mississippi, and Del Rio, Texas, before they settled in Claremont, California, when she was nine years old. Alba has described her family as "very conservative… a traditional, Catholic, Latin American family", and herself as very liberal; she says she identified as a "feminist" as early as age five.

Alba's early life was marked by a multitude of physical maladies. During childhood, she suffered from pneumonia four to five times a year and had partially collapsed lungs twice, as well as a ruptured appendix and tonsillar cyst. She has also had asthma since she was a child. She became isolated from other children at school because she was hospitalized so often; no one knew her well enough to befriend her. She has said that her family's frequent moving also contributed to her isolation from her peers. She graduated from Claremont High School at age 16 and subsequently attended the Atlantic Theater Company.

== Acting career ==
=== 1992–1999: Beginnings ===
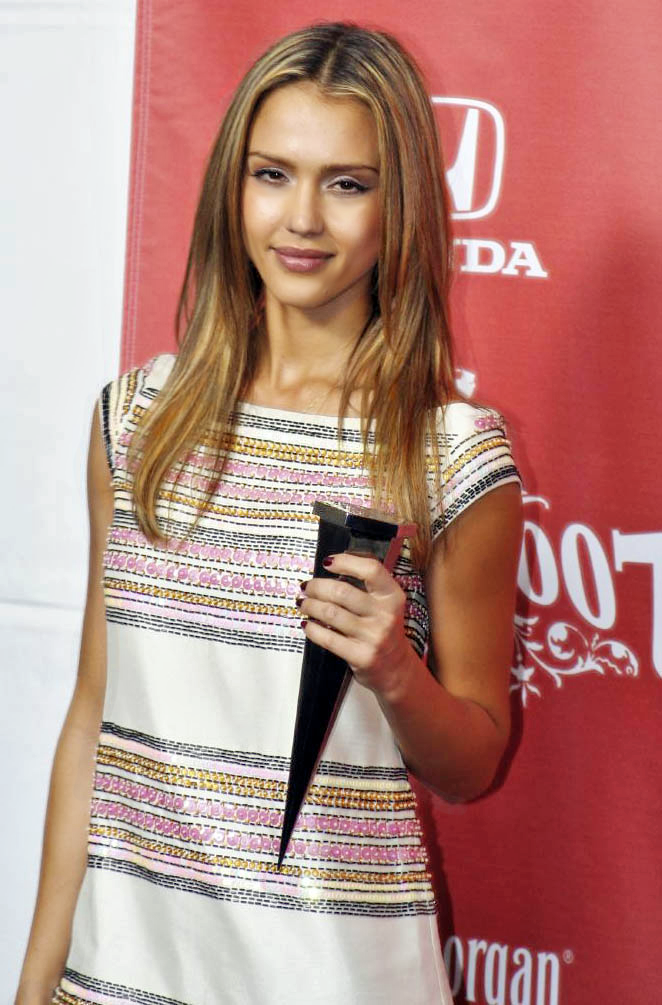
Alba in 2007

Alba expressed an interest in acting from age five. In 1992, the eleven-year-old Alba persuaded her mother to take her to an acting competition in Beverly Hills, where the grand prize was free acting classes. She won the grand prize and took her first acting lessons. An agent signed her nine months later. Her first film appearance was a small role in the 1994 feature Camp Nowhere as Gail. She was originally hired for two weeks, but her role turned into a two-month job when one of the prominent actresses dropped out.

Alba appeared in two national television commercials for Nintendo and J. C. Penney as a child. She was later featured in several independent films. She branched out into television in 1994 with a recurring role as the vain Jessica in three episodes of the Nickelodeon comedy series The Secret World of Alex Mack. She then performed the role of Maya in the first two seasons of the 1995 television series Flipper. Under the tutelage of her lifeguard mother, Alba learned to swim before she could walk, and had PADI certified scuba diving skills which were put to use on the show, which was filmed in Australia.

In 1998, she appeared as Melissa Hauer in a first-season episode of the Steven Bochco crime drama Brooklyn South, as Leanne in two episodes of Beverly Hills, 90210, and as Layla in an episode of Love Boat: The Next Wave. In 1999, she appeared in the Randy Quaid comedy feature P.U.N.K.S.. After Alba graduated from high school, she studied acting with William H. Macy and his wife, Felicity Huffman, at the Atlantic Theater Company, which was developed by Macy and Pulitzer Prize-winning playwright and film director, David Mamet. Alba rose to greater prominence in Hollywood in 1999 after appearing as a member of a snobby high school clique tormenting an insecure copy editor in the romantic comedy Never Been Kissed, opposite Drew Barrymore, and as the female lead in the little seen comedy horror film Idle Hands, alongside Devon Sawa.

=== 2000–2006: Worldwide recognition ===
Her big break came when James Cameron picked Alba from over 1000 candidates for the role of the genetically engineered super-soldier Max Guevara on the FOX sci-fi television series Dark Angel. The series ran for two seasons, until 2002, and earned Alba critical acclaim, a Golden Globe nomination, the Teen Choice Award for Choice Actress, and a Saturn Award for Best Actress. Her role has been cited as a feminist character and is considered a symbol of female empowerment. Writing for the University of Melbourne, Bronwen Auty considered Max "the archetypal modern feminist hero—a young woman empowered to use her body actively to achieve goals", citing Max's refusal to use firearms and instead using martial arts and knowledge as weapons. In 2004, Max was ranked #17 in TV Guide's list of "25 Greatest Sci-Fi Legends". Her Dark Angel role led to significant parts in films. She had her big screen breakthrough in 2003 when she starred as an aspiring dancer-choreographer in Honey. Rotten Tomatoes' critical consensus was: "An attractive Jessica Alba and energetic dance numbers provide some lift to this corny and formulaic movie". Budgeted at US$18 million, the film made US$62.2 million.

Alba next played exotic dancer Nancy Callahan, as part of a long ensemble cast, in the neo-noir crime anthology film Sin City (2005), written, produced, and directed by Robert Rodriguez and Frank Miller. It is based on Miller's graphic novel of the same name. She had not heard about the novel before her involvement with the film, but was eager to work with Rodriguez. The film was a critical darling and grossed US$158.8 million. She received a MTV Movie Award for Sexiest Performance.

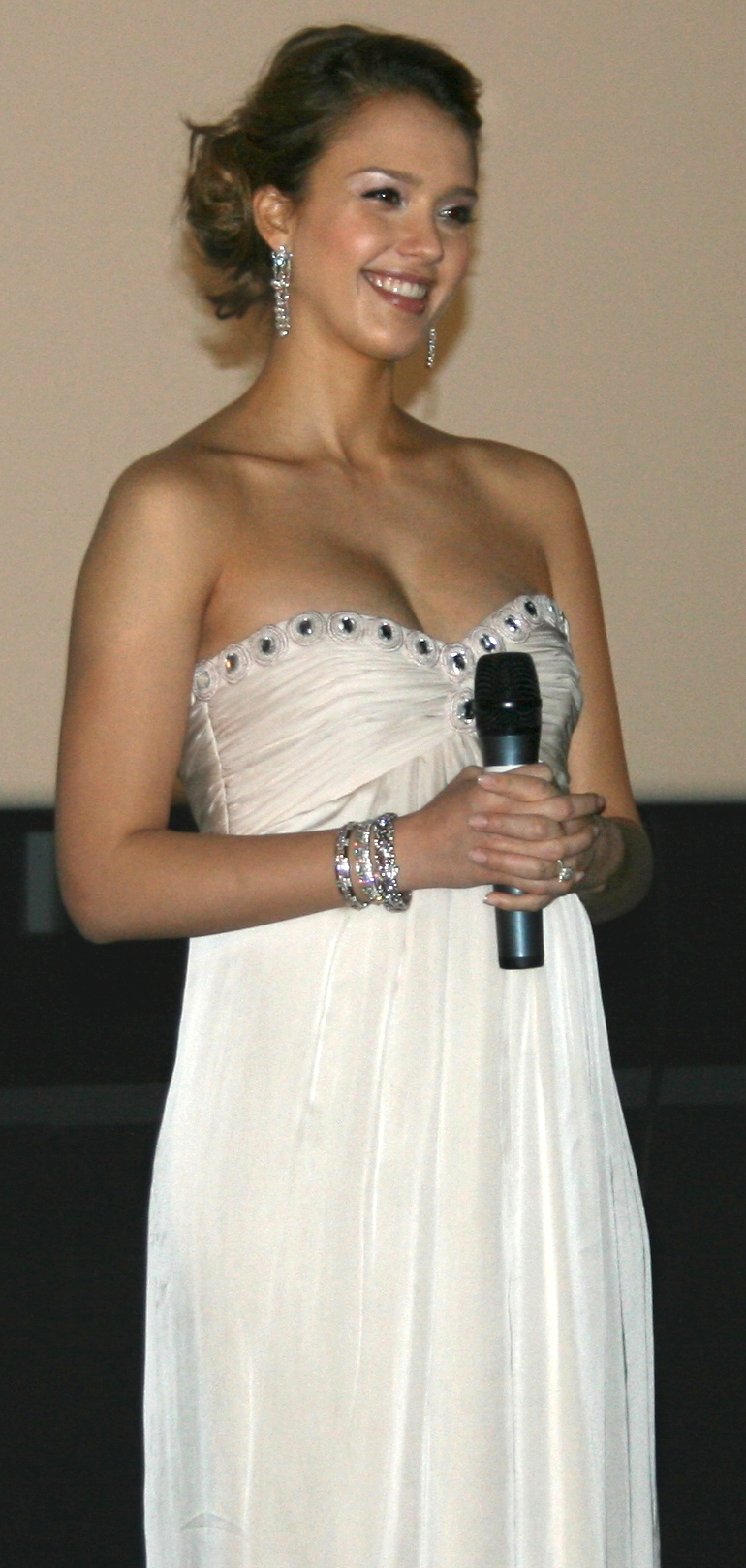
Alba at a screening for The Eye (2008)

Alba portrayed the Marvel Comics character Invisible Woman in Fantastic Four (also 2005), alongside Ioan Gruffudd, Chris Evans, Michael Chiklis, and Julian McMahon. The Guardian, in its review for the film, noted: "Feminists and non-feminists alike must absorb the Fantastic Four's most troubling paradox: having been admitted to the story on the grounds of her beauty, [Alba's] superpower is to be invisible". The film was a commercial success despite negative reviews, grossing US$333.5 million worldwide. At the 2006 MTV Movie Awards, Alba earned nominations for Best Hero and Best On-Screen Team. Her last 2005 film was the thriller Into the Blue, where she portrayed, opposite Paul Walker, one half of a couple who find themselves in trouble with a drug lord after finding the illicit cargo of a sunken airplane. The film saw moderate box office returns, with a US$44.4 million worldwide gross. She hosted the 2006 MTV Movie Awards and performed sketches spoofing the movies King Kong, Mission: Impossible III and The Da Vinci Code.

=== 2007–2010: Romantic comedies ===
Alba reprised her role in Fantastic Four: Rise of the Silver Surfer, released in June 2007. According to Alba, Tim Story's direction during an emotional scene almost made her quit acting. "[He told me] 'It looks too real. It looks too painful. Can you be prettier when you cry? Cry pretty, Jessica.' He was like, 'Don't do that thing with your face. Just make it flat. We can CGI the tears in." According to Alba, this experience filled her with self-doubt: "And then it all got me thinking: Am I not good enough? Are my instincts and my emotions not good enough? Do people hate them so much that they don't want me to be a person? Am I not allowed to be a person in my work? And so I just said, 'Fuck it. I don't care about this business anymore.'" The film grossed US$290 million globally.

In Good Luck Chuck (also 2007), Alba portrayed the love interest of a womanizer dentist. She posed for one of the Good Luck Chuck's theatrical posters parodying the well-known Rolling Stone cover photographed by Annie Leibovitz featuring John Lennon and Yoko Ono in similar poses. While the film was heavily panned by critics, it made almost US$60 million upon its release. Her third starring vehicle in 2007 was the psychological thriller Awake, portraying the girlfriend of a wealthy man who is about to have a heart transplant. Reviews were lukewarm, but Roger Ebert praised her performance, and budgeted at around US$8 million, the film made US$32.7 million.

In February 2008, she hosted the Academy of Motion Picture Arts and Sciences' Science and Technical Awards. Alba made her acting transition to the horror genre in the film The Eye, a remake of the Hong Kong original, in which she obtained the role of a successful classical violinist who receives an eye transplant that allows her to see into the supernatural world. Though the film was not well received by critics, her performance itself received mixed reviews. She garnered a Teen Choice for Choice Movie Actress: Horror–Thriller and a Razzie Award nomination for Worst Actress (shared with The Love Guru). In 2008, she also played a salesgirl in the independent romantic comedy Meet Bill, alongside Logan Lerman and Elizabeth Banks, and starred in the comedy The Love Guru, as a woman who inherits the Toronto Maple Leafs hockey team, opposite Mike Myers and Justin Timberlake. Mick LaSalle, of the San Francisco Chronicle, noting that she was "prominently" in the film, felt that she "finally seems relaxed on camera". The Love Guru was a critical and commercial flop.

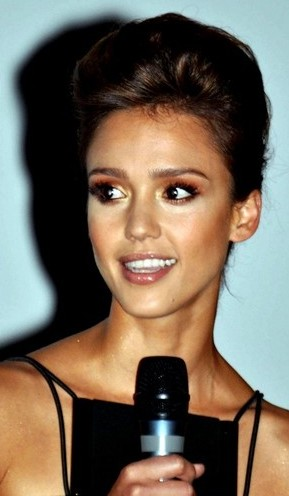
Alba in 2010

While Alba did not have any film releases in 2009, five high-profile films released throughout 2010 featured her in significant roles. Her first role in the year was that of a prostitute in The Killer Inside Me, an adaptation of the book of the same name, opposite Kate Hudson and Casey Affleck, which premiered at the Sundance Film Festival to polarized reactions from critics. Her next film was the romantic comedy Valentine's Day, in which she played the girlfriend of a florist as part of a long ensemble cast consisting of Jessica Biel, Bradley Cooper, Taylor Lautner and Julia Roberts, among others. Despite negative reviews, the film was a commercial success, with a worldwide gross of US$216.5 million. In the action film Machete, Alba reunited with director Robert Rodriguez, taking on the role of an immigration officer torn between enforcing the law and doing what is popular in the eyes of her family. Machete made over US$44 million globally.

The drama An Invisible Sign of My Own, which Alba filmed in late 2008, premiered at the Hamptons Film Festival. In it, she portrayed a painfully withdrawn young woman. Her last 2010 film was the comedy Little Fockers, in which she played an extrovert drug representative, reuniting with Robert De Niro, who was also in Machete. Despite negative reviews from critics, the film grossed over US$310 million worldwide. For all her 2010 roles, she received a Razzie Award for Worst Supporting Actress.

=== 2011–present: action and independent media productions ===
In 2011, Alba worked for the third time with Robert Rodriguez in the film Spy Kids: All the Time in the World, portraying a retired spy who is called back into action. To bond with her new stepchildren, she invites them along. The film paled at the box office in comparison to the previous films in the franchise, but was still a moderate success, taking in US$85 million around the globe. Alba next appeared with Adam Scott, Richard Jenkins, Jane Lynch, Mary Elizabeth Winstead, and Catherine O'Hara in the comedy A.C.O.D. (2013), portraying what the Washington Post described as a "fellow child of divorce", with whom Scott's character "almost cheats on" her girlfriend. ScreenRant critic Ben Kendrick wrote: "[Winstead] and [Alba] also deliver in their contributions – though both of their characters are mainly designed to be mirrors for Carter to examine his own life and choices." A.C.O.D. received a limited theatrical run in North America. In 2013, Alba also made her voice acting debut in the moderately successful animated film Escape from Planet Earth.

Alba worked once again with director Rodriguez for two film sequels. She reprised her role of an Immigration Officer, in an uncredited cameo appearance, in Machete Kills (2013), which flopped with critics and audiences, and her much larger role of stripper Nancy Callahan, seeking to avenge her late protector, in Sin City: A Dame to Kill For, which was released in August 2014, on 2D and 3D. Unlike the first film, A Dame to Kill For was a commercial failure, grossing US$39 million against its US$65 million production budget, and received mixed reviews from film critics. Variety felt it was a "late, limp attempt to turn Alba's character from an exploited figure into an empowered one". She next took on the roles of a cabaret show performer in the dramedy Dear Eleanor (2014), the athletic girlfriend of a successful and well-respected English professor in the romantic comedy Some Kind of Beautiful (2014), a receptionist at a limo company in the thriller Stretch (also 2014), an emotionally vulnerable weapons trafficker in the crime comedy Barely Lethal (2015), and that of a documentary filmmaker in the horror film The Veil (2016); all films were released for limited theatrical runs and VOD.

In the action film Mechanic: Resurrection (2016), alongside Jason Statham, Alba played the girlfriend of a retired hitman. She did Krav Maga to get into shape for the film, and was drawn to the strength her character exhibited, remarking: "I think for these types of movies you don't often get to see the female romantic lead kind of kick butt. I mean, it's usually she's being saved by the guy, and so it's nice that I got to come to the table with a toughness, and a real heart". The film made US$125.7 million worldwide.

In 2020, it was announced that Alba would star in and executive produce a new documentary series for Disney+ called Parenting Without Borders (working title), which would focus on families around the world and their beliefs and culture, it was never released.

== Other endeavors ==
=== The Honest Company ===
In January 2012, Alba and business partner Christopher Gavigan launched the Honest Company, selling a collection of household goods, diapers, and body care products. The company was successful, and was valued at US$1 billion as of 2014.

In early 2013, Alba released her book, The Honest Life, based on her experiences creating a natural, non-toxic life for her family. The book became a New York Times Best Seller. In October 2015, Alba launched a collection of skin care and beauty products called Honest Beauty.

As of April 2022, Alba owned 6.5 percent of the company. She was employed as the company's chief creative officer, receiving an annual base salary of $700,000 and restricted stock valued at $1,500,000. Alba stepped down as chief creative officer in April 2024.

=== Charity and activism ===
Alba posed for a bondage-themed print advertising campaign by Declare Yourself, a campaign encouraging voter registration among youth for the 2008 United States presidential election. The ads, photographed by Mark Liddell, feature Alba wrapped in and gagged with black tape, and drew national media attention. Alba said of doing the advertisements that "it didn't freak me out at all." Alba also said, "I think it is important for young people to be aware of the need we have in this country to get them more active politically...People respond to shocking things."

Alba endorsed and supported Democratic presidential hopeful Barack Obama during the 2008 primary season. She also endorsed Hillary Clinton's campaign for president.

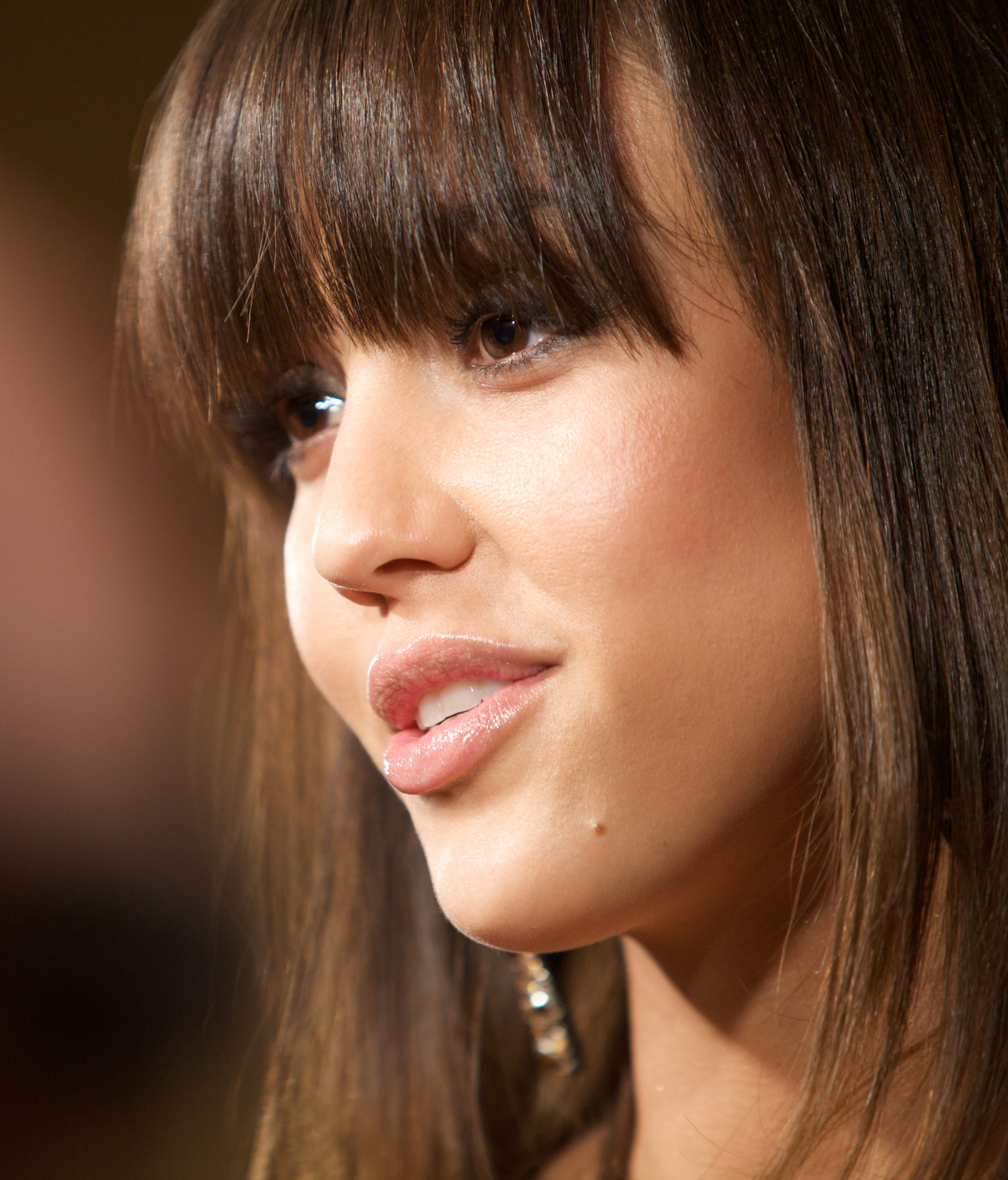
Alba in 2009

In June 2009, while filming The Killer Inside Me in Oklahoma City, Alba was involved in a controversy with residents when she pasted posters of sharks around town. Alba said that she was trying to bring attention to the diminishing population of great white sharks. Media outlets speculated that Alba would be pursued and charged with vandalism. On June 16, 2009, Oklahoma City police said that they would not pursue criminal charges against Alba, because none of the property owners wanted to pursue it. Alba apologized in a statement to People magazine and said that she regretted her actions. She later donated an undisclosed amount of money (over US$500) to the United Way, whose billboard she had obscured with one of the shark posters.

In 2011, Alba participated in a two-day lobbying effort in Washington, D.C. in support of the Safe Chemicals Act, a revision of the Toxic Substances Control Act of 1976. Alba returned to Capitol Hill in 2015 to lobby lawmakers as they once again debated a replacement for the 1976 Substances Control Act. She has also been a strong supporter of gay rights and on June 27, 2013, she expressed her delight with the Supreme Court's decision to strike down DOMA on her Twitter account. She tweeted "#equality #love".

Alba's charity work has included participation with Clothes Off Our Back, Habitat for Humanity, National Center for Missing and Exploited Children, Project HOME, RADD, Revlon Run/Walk for Women, SOS Children's Villages, Soles4Souls, Step Up and Baby2Baby. Alba is an ambassador for the 1Goal movement to provide education to children in Africa. She has also served as a Baby2Baby "angel" ambassador, donating and helping to distribute items such as diapers and clothing to families in Los Angeles. In 2015, Alba and The Honest Company sponsored a laboratory at Mount Sinai Hospital in New York City. The lab was announced to be a specialized room designed to keep out dust and particles, where a team of epidemiologists would research links between household chemicals and autism.

=== Lady Spitfire ===
Alba founded a film and TV production company Lady Spitfire in 2024, along with producer Tracey Nyberg. The company focused on female-driven and Latino themes, and produced films such as Trigger Warning, and Flash Before the Bang. The company was later renamed to Lady Metalmark Entertainment.

== Public image ==
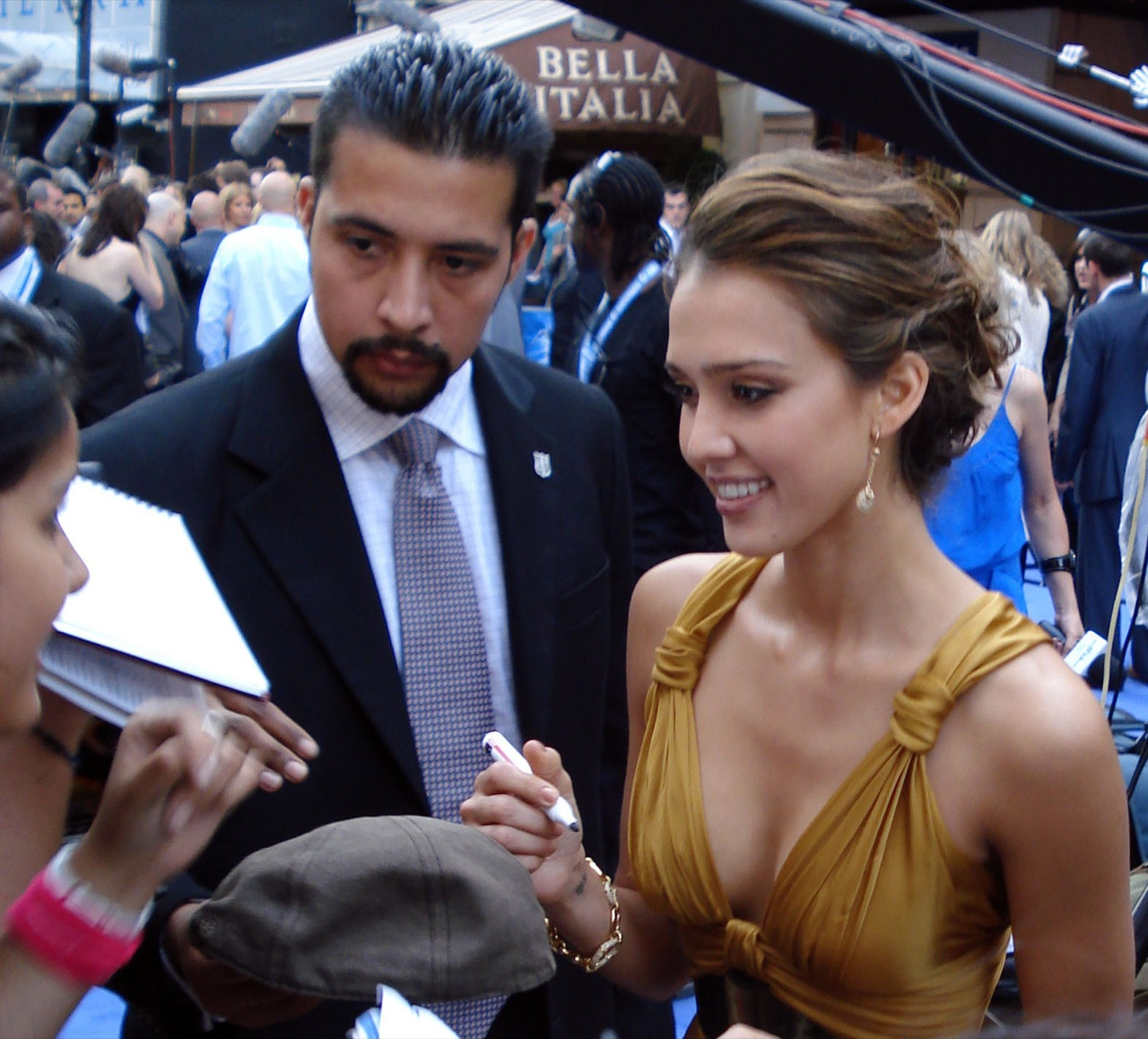
Alba in 2007 at the London premiere of Fantastic Four: Rise of the Silver Surfer

Alba has received attention for her looks over the years and has been included in several publications' lists of the most attractive celebrities of the time. She was included in Maxim magazine's Hot 100 list multiple times from 2001 to 2014. On this she has said, "I have to go to certain lengths to use sexuality to my advantage, while guiding people to thinking the way I want them to." In 2002, she was voted the fifth Sexiest Female Star in a Hollywood.com poll. In 2005, she was named one of People Magazine's 50 Most Beautiful People, and appeared in the magazine's 100 Most Beautiful list in 2007. She has also been named on FHM's Sexiest Women lists.

Alba was named among Playboy magazine's "25 Sexiest Celebrities" in 2006, and appeared on its cover that year. She was involved in litigation against Playboy for its use of her image on this cover (from a promotional shot for Into the Blue) without her consent, which she contended gave the impression that she was featured in the issue in a "nude pictorial". She later dropped the lawsuit after receiving a personal apology from Playboy owner Hugh Hefner, who agreed to make donations to two charities Alba had supported. Also in 2006, readers of AskMen.com voted Alba #1 on its "99 Most Desirable Women" list. In 2007, Alba was ranked No.4 on Empire magazine's "100 Sexiest Movie Stars". Both GQ and InStyle had Alba on their June 2008 covers. She appeared in the 2009 Campari calendar, which featured photos of her posing; Campari printed 9,999 copies of the calendar. In 2011, she was named one of the "100 Hottest Women of All-Time" by Men's Health, and in 2012 People named her one of the year's "Most Beautiful at Every Age".

In 2010, reports surfaced that a 21-year-old Chinese girl was seeking plastic surgery to resemble Alba to win back an ex-boyfriend; the star spoke out against the perceived need to change one's appearance for love.

I think some ambitious girls will do anything to be famous, and they think men in this business are used to women doing that. Contrary to how people may feel, I've never used my sexuality. That's not part of it for me. When I'm in a meeting, I want to tell you why I'm an asset, how I'm a commodity, how I can put asses in the seats, not, "There's a chance you're going to be able to fuck me." That's never been my deal.

— Alba on not using her sex appeal to reach her goals in her acting career, 2008

Alba has commented on her fears of being typecast as a sex kitten based on the bulk of parts offered to her. In an interview, Alba said she wanted to be taken seriously as an actress but believed she needed to do movies that she would otherwise not be interested in to build her career, stating that eventually she hoped to be more selective in her film projects.

Alba has been quoted as saying she will not do nudity for a role. She was given the option to appear nude in Sin City by the film's directors, Frank Miller and Robert Rodriguez, but declined the offer, saying, "I don't do nudity. I just don't. Maybe that makes me a bad actress. Maybe I won't get hired in some things. But I have too much anxiety". She remarked of a GQ shoot in which she was scantily clad, "They didn't want me to wear the granny panties, but I said, 'If I'm gonna be topless I need to wear granny panties."

== Personal life ==
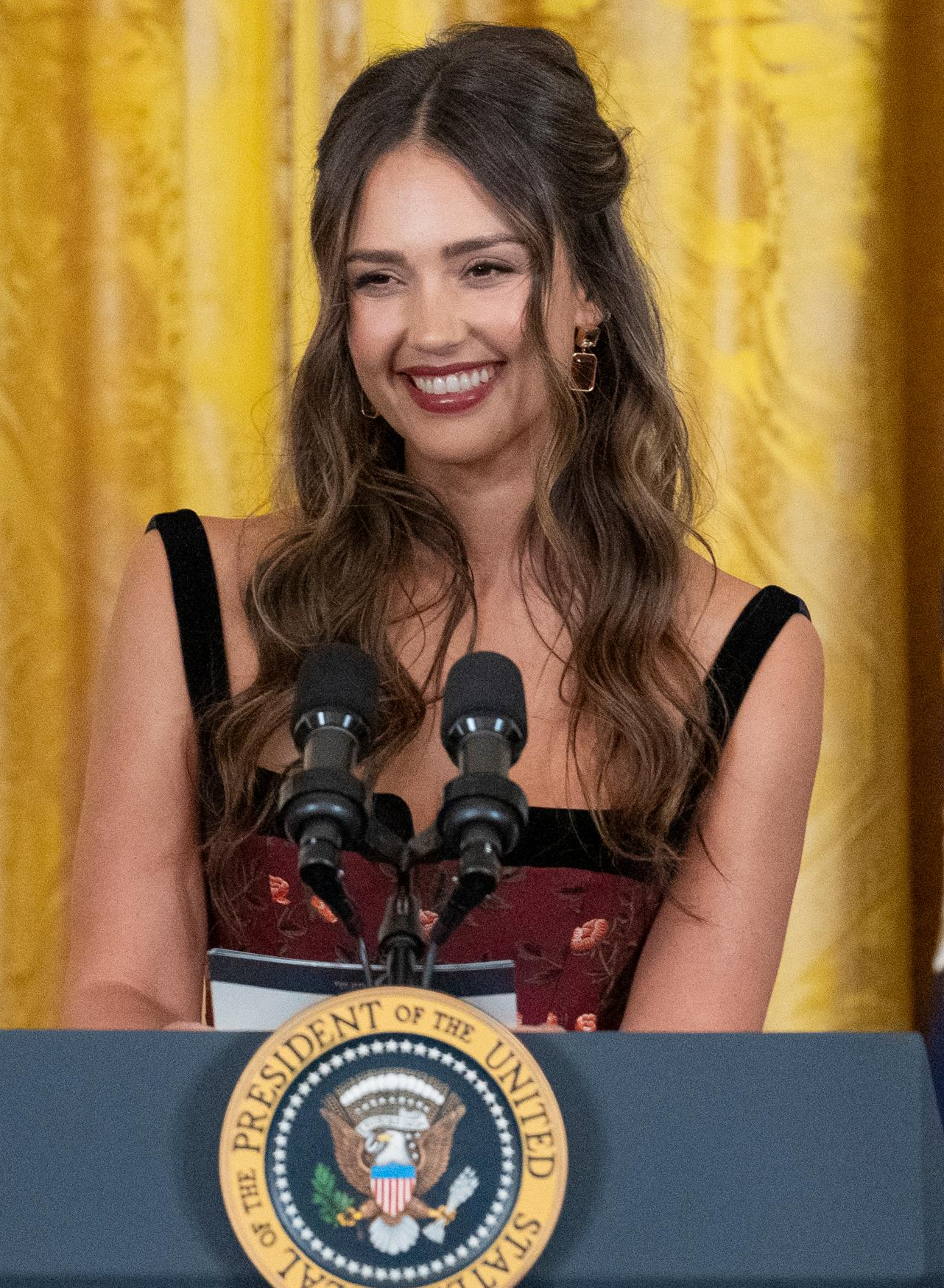
Alba in 2024 at the White House

Alba was raised a Catholic throughout her teenage years. After a four-year stint as a born-again Christian, she backed away from religion because she felt she was being judged for her appearance, explaining, "Older men would hit on me, and my youth pastor said it was because I was wearing provocative clothing, when I wasn't. It just made me feel like if I was in any way desirable to the opposite sex, that it was my fault, and it made me ashamed of my body and being a woman."

Alba also had objections to the church's condemnations of premarital sex and homosexuality, and what she saw as a lack of strong female role models in the Bible, explaining: "I thought it was a nice guide, but it certainly wasn't how I was going to live my life." Her "religious devotion [began] to wane" at age 15 when she guest-starred as a teenager with gonorrhea in the throat in a 1996 episode of the television series Chicago Hope. Her friends at church reacted negatively to her role, making her lose faith in the Church. However, she has stated that she still holds a belief in God.

While filming Dark Angel in January 2000, Alba began a three-year relationship with her co-star Michael Weatherly. Weatherly proposed to Alba on her 20th birthday, which she accepted. In August 2003, they announced that they had ended their relationship. In July 2007, Alba spoke out about the breakup, saying, "I don't know [why I got engaged]. I was a virgin. He was 12 years older than me. I thought he knew better. My parents weren't happy. They're really religious. They believe God wouldn't allow the Bible to be written if it weren't what they are supposed to believe. I'm completely different."

Alba met Cash Warren, son of actor Michael Warren, while filming Fantastic Four in 2004. They were married in Los Angeles in May 2008. They have three children: two daughters, Marie and Haven, and son Hayes. The first pictures of her eldest daughter Marie, which appeared in the July 2008 issue of OK! magazine, reportedly earned Alba US$1.5 million. On January 16, 2025, Alba announced that they had separated followed by filing for divorce the next month.

As of July 2025, Alba was dating actor Danny Ramirez.

In 2014, Alba appeared in Henry Louis Gates Jr.'s genealogy series Finding Your Roots, which documented her learning about her lineage, which was traced back to the ancient Maya civilization. The show's research indicated that her surname was not inherited from a Spanish man, since her father's paternal line (Y-DNA) was Haplogroup Q-M3, being Indigenous American in origin. His matrilineal line (mtDNA) was Jewish and revealed that lawyer Alan Dershowitz is a genetic relative of hers. Alba's global admixture was 72.7% European, 22.5% Native American ("East Asian and Native American"), 2% sub-Saharan African, 0.3% Middle Eastern and North African, 0.1% South Asian and 2.4% "no match".

== Filmography ==
=== Film ===
Year	Title	Role	Notes
1994	Camp Nowhere	Gail	
1995	Venus Rising	Young Eve	
1999	P.U.N.K.S.	Samantha Swoboda	
1999	Never Been Kissed	Kirsten Liosis	
1999	Idle Hands	Molly	
2000	Paranoid	Chloe	
2003	The Sleeping Dictionary	Selima	
2003	Honey	Honey Daniels	
2005	Sin City	Nancy Callahan	
2005	Fantastic Four	Susan Storm / Invisible Woman	
2005	Into the Blue	Sam	
2007	The Ten	Liz Anne Blazer	
2007	Knocked Up	Herself	Uncredited cameo
2007	Fantastic Four: Rise of the Silver Surfer	Susan Storm / Invisible Woman	
2007	Good Luck Chuck	Cam Wexler	
2007	Meet Bill	Lucy	
2007	Awake	Sam Lockwood	
2008	The Eye	Sydney Wells	
2008	The Love Guru	Jane Bullard	
2010	The Killer Inside Me	Joyce Lakeland	
2010	Valentine's Day	Morley Clarkson	
2010	Machete	Special Agent Sartana Rivera	
2010	Machete	Marissa Rivera	Deleted scene
2010	An Invisible Sign	Mona Gray	
2010	Little Fockers	Andi Garcia	
2011	Spy Kids: All the Time in the World	Marissa Wilson (née Cortez)	
2012	Martin Scorsese Eats a Cookie	Herself	
2013	A.C.O.D.	Michelle	
2013	Escape from Planet Earth	Lena (voice)	
2013	Machete Kills	Sartana Rivera	Uncredited cameo
2014	Sin City: A Dame to Kill For	Nancy Callahan	
2014	Stretch	Charlie	
2014	Some Kind of Beautiful	Kate	
2015	Barely Lethal	Victoria Knox	
2015	Entourage	Herself	Cameo
2016	The Veil	Maggie Price	
2016	Dear Eleanor	Aunt Daisy Wax	
2016	Mechanic: Resurrection	Gina Thornton	
2017	El Camino Christmas	Beth Flowers	
2019	Killers Anonymous	Jade	
2021	Dubai Presents: Mission	The Wife	Short film
2024	Trigger Warning	Parker Calvo	
2026	Maserati: The Brothers †	Sandra	Post-production

=== Television ===
Year	Title	Role	Notes
1994	The Secret World of Alex Mack	Jessica	3 episodes
1995–1997	Flipper	Maya Graham	Main role; 44 episodes
1996	ABC Afterschool Special	Christy	Episode: "Too Soon for Jeff"
1996	Chicago Hope	Florie Hernandez	Episode: "Sexual Perversity in Chicago Hope"
1998	Brooklyn South	Melissa Hauer	Episode: "Exposing Johnson"
1998	Beverly Hills, 90210	Leanne	2 episodes
1998	Love Boat: The Next Wave	Layla	Episode: "Remember?"
2000–2002	Dark Angel	Max Guevara / X5-452	Lead role (42 episodes)
2003	MADtv	Jessica Simpson	Episode: "Episode #9.5"
2004	Entourage	Herself	Episode: "The Review"
2005	Trippin'	Herself	2 episodes
2009	The Office	Sophie	Episode: "Stress Relief"
2010	Project Runway	Herself (guest judge)	Episode: "Sew Much Pressure"
2013	Comedy Bang! Bang!	Herself	Episode: "Jessica Alba Wears a Jacket with Patent Leather Pumps"
2014	The Spoils of Babylon	Dixie Mellonworth	4 episodes
2015	RuPaul's Drag Race	Herself (guest judge)	Episode: "Spoof! (There It Is)"
2017	Planet of the Apps	Herself	Mentor
2018	No Activity	Herself	Episode: "The Actress"
2019–2020	L.A.'s Finest	Nancy McKenna	Main role
2023	StoryBots: Answer Time	Ms. Pizza Delivery Lady	Episode: "Time and Distance"

=== Music videos ===
Year	Title	Artist(s)	Role	Ref.
2008	"We Are the Ones"	will.i.am	Herself	
2010	"I Just Had Sex"	The Lonely Island	Jorma Taccone's love interest	
2015	"Bad Blood"	Taylor Swift featuring Kendrick Lamar	Domino	
2025	"Gabriela"	Katseye	CEO of Gabriela Enterprises	

=== Video games ===
Year	Title	Role	Notes
2002	Dark Angel	Max Guevara	Based on the TV series of the same name
2005	Fantastic Four	Sue Storm / Invisible Woman	Based on the film of the same name

== Awards ==
Year	Awards	Category	Nominated work	Result
2001	ALMA Award	Breakthrough Actress of the Year	—	Won
2001	People's Choice Awards	Favorite Female Performer in a New TV Series	Dark Angel	Nominated
2001	Golden Globe Awards	Best Performance by an Actress in a TV Series – Drama	Dark Angel	Nominated
2002	Nickelodeon Kids' Choice Awards	Favorite Female Action Hero	Dark Angel	Nominated
2005	Young Hollywood Awards	Superstar of Tomorrow	—	Won
2006	Nickelodeon Kids' Choice Awards	Favorite Movie Actress	Fantastic Four	Nominated
2006	Golden Raspberry Awards	Worst Actress	Fantastic Four / Into the Blue	Nominated
2007	TV Land Awards	Little Screen / Big Screen Star (Women)	—	Nominated
2007	Spike TV Guys' Choice Awards	Hottest Jessica	—	Won
2008	Golden Raspberry Awards	Worst Actress	Awake / Good Luck Chuck / Fantastic Four: Rise of the Silver Surfer	Nominated
2008	Golden Raspberry Awards	Worst Screen Couple	Awake / Good Luck Chuck / Fantastic Four: Rise of the Silver Surfer (shared with Hayden Christensen, Dane Cook, and Ioan Gruffud)	Nominated
2008	People's Choice Awards	Favorite Female Action Star	—	Nominated
2008	People's Choice Awards	Favorite Leading Lady	—	Nominated
2008	Nickelodeon Kids' Choice Awards	Favorite Female Movie Star	Fantastic 4: Rise of the Silver Surfer	Won
2009	Golden Raspberry Awards	Worst Actress	The Eye / The Love Guru	Nominated
2011	Golden Raspberry Awards	Worst Supporting Actress	The Killer Inside Me / Little Fockers / Machete / Valentine's Day	Won
2012	Nickelodeon Kids' Choice Awards	Favorite Buttkicker	Spy Kids: All the Time in the World in 4D	Nominated
2019	Teen Choice Awards	Choice Action TV Actress	L.A.'s Finest	Nominated
