= List of programs broadcast by The WB 100+ Station Group =

The following is a list of programs which have been broadcast on The WB 100+ Station Group, a specialized programming service feed that operated from September 1998 to September 2006 and was distributed mainly to media markets ranked above #100 by Nielsen, which provided a master schedule of network content from parent television network The WB and acquired programs distributed for syndication that filled time periods not allocated to network programming (some of which were subsequently acquired by successor service The CW Plus, following the announcement of The CW's launch and the shutdowns of The WB and UPN).

== Former programming ==
=== Dramas ===
- Angel (2003–05)
- Acapulco H.E.A.T.
- Buffy the Vampire Slayer (2003–05)
- China Beach (1999–2000)
- Conan the Adventurer
- Cobra (1998-99)
- Early Edition
- The Equalizer (1998–2001)
- ER
- Hotel
- The Immortal (2000–01)
- In the Heat of the Night (2000–04)
- Knight Rider (1998-99)
- The Lost World (1999–2003)
- Midnight Caller
- Mortal Kombat Conquest (1998-99)
- My Secret Identity (1998-99)
- The New Adventures of Robin Hood (1998–2000)
- Once a Thief (2002-03)
- Smallville
- The Pretender
- The Practice (2001-03)
- Quincy, M.E. (1998–2001)
- The Rockford Files (1998–2001)
- The Secret Adventures of Jules Verne
- Spenser: For Hire (1999-2000)
- The Twilight Zone (2004–06)
- Thunderbox (2000-02)
- The West Wing (2003–06)
- Wiseguy (1998-99)

=== Comedies ===
- The Bernie Mac Show (2005–06)
- The Cosby Show (2004-06)
- The Drew Carey Show (1999–2006)
- Friends (1998–2001)
- In the House (1999–2001)
- The Jamie Foxx Show (2000–02)
- The King of Queens (2003–06)
- Mad About You (2004-06)
- Mad TV
- Major Dad (1998–2000)
- Mama's Family (1998-2006)
- The Nanny (2004-06)
- The Larry Sanders Show (2002-04)
- The Parent 'Hood (1999–2001)
- Perfect Strangers (2001–02)
- Police Academy: The Series
- South Park (2005-06)
- Sex and the City (2005–06)
- The Wayans Bros. (1999–2001)
- Will & Grace (2002–06)
- Yes, Dear (2004–06)

=== Reality/other ===
- The 5th Wheel (2001–04)
- Ask Rita (2003–04)
- B. Smith with Style
- The Bravest (2001-02)
- Celebrity Justice (2002–05)
- Cheaters (2001–06)
- Change of Heart (1998-99)
- Cops (2002–06)
- The Daily Buzz (2002–06)
- Destination Stardom
- ElimiDate (2001–05)
- The Ellen DeGeneres Show (2003–05)
- Entertainers with Byron Allen
- Every Woman
- Famous Homes & Hideaways
- Global Business People
- Hard Rock Live
- The Jane Whitney Show (1998-99)
- The Jenny Jones Show (1998-2000)
- Jim Fowler's Life in the Wild
- Keeping It Wild
- Kickin' It with Byron Allen
- Kwik Witz (1998-2000)
- Life & Style (2004–05)
- Living Edge
- The Larry Elder Show (2004-05)
- Love Connection (1998–99)
- Moral Court
- Ripley's Believe It or Not! (2003–06)
- Ricki Lake (2003-04)
- Rendez-View
- Real World' (2000-02)
- Road Rules
- Ron Hazelton's HouseCalls
- The Rosie O'Donnell Show (1998–2002)
- Scope (2001-02)
- The Sharon Osbourne Show (2003–04)
- Talk or Walk
- Texas Justice (2002–05)
- That's Funny (2004-06)
- World's Wildest Police Videos (2001-03)
- WWE Bottom Line (2002-05)
- WWF Attitude (2001-02)

=== Children's programming ===
- Anyplace Wild (2003)
- Awesome Adventures
- Beakman's World (2006)
- Beetlejuice (2001–02)
- BKN (1998–2001)
- California Dreams (2003)
- City Guys (2001–03)
- Crash! Bang! Splat! (2005–06)
- Critter Gitters (2005–06)
- D'Myna Leagues (2003–04)
- DiC Kids Network (2003–05)
  - Archie's Weird Mysteries (2003-2004)
  - Liberty's Kids (2004-2005)
  - Sabrina: The Animated Series (2003, 2005)
  - Sabrina's Secret Life (2003-2004)
  - Super Duper Sumos (2004)
  - The Littles (2003-2004)
- Field Trip (1999–2000)
- Go For It! (2003–05)
- Kid Guides (2006)
- Heavy Gear The Animated Series (2001–02)
- The Lionhearts (1998–99)
- The New Adventures of Batman
- Poochini's Yard (2003–04)
- Pressure 1 (1999–2000)
- Pressure 2
- Richie Rich (2001)
- Real Life 101 (2005–06)
- Saved by the Bell
- Sherlock Holmes in the 22nd Century
- Taz-Mania (2001–02)
- Tama and Friends (2001–02)
- Teen Talk (2002–03)
- Ultimate Choice (2005–06)
- Voltron: The Third Dimension (1998–2000)
- War Planets (1998–99)

== See also ==
- List of programs broadcast by The WB
- List of programs broadcast by Kids' WB
- List of programs broadcast by The CW Plus
