= TWF =

TWF may refer to:

- Thumb Wrestling Federation
- This World Fair, an American rock band
- Magic Valley Regional Airport, an airport serving Twin Falls, Idaho, United States (IATA airport code: TWF)
- Those Who Fear, an American christian metal band
- Turkey Wealth Fund

== See also ==
- TWF1
- TWF2
