= Dark Angel (American TV series) =

American science fiction action drama television series

- Genre: Science fiction; Action; Drama
- Created by: James Cameron; Charles H. Eglee
- Starring: Jessica Alba; Michael Weatherly; Alimi Ballard; Jennifer Blanc; Richard Gunn; J. C. MacKenzie; Valarie Rae Miller; John Savage; Jensen Ackles; Martin Cummins; Kevin Durand; Ashley Scott
- Theme music composer: Chuck D; Gary G-Wiz
- Composers: Joel McNeely; Amani K. Smith
- Country of origin: United States
- Original language: English
- No. of seasons: 2
- No. of episodes: 43 (list of episodes)

Production
- Executive producers: James Cameron; Charles H. Eglee; René Echevarria
- Running time: 43 minutes; 86 minutes ("Pilot"); 60 minutes ("Freak Nation")
- Production companies: Cameron/Eglee Productions; 20th Century Fox Television

Original release
- Network: Fox
- Release: October 3, 2000 – May 3, 2002

Dark Angel is an American science fiction action drama television series that aired on Fox from October 3, 2000, to May 3, 2002. Created by James Cameron and Charles H. Eglee, it stars Jessica Alba in her breakthrough role. Set in 2019, the series chronicles the life of Max Guevara (Alba), a genetically enhanced runaway supersoldier who escapes from a covert military facility as a child. In a dystopian near-future Seattle, she tries to lead a normal life while eluding capture by government agents and searching for her brothers and sisters scattered in the aftermath of their escape. Dark Angel was the only show produced by the company Cameron/Eglee Productions, with principal photography in Vancouver, at Lionsgate Studios.

The high-budget pilot episode marked Cameron's television debut and was heavily promoted by Fox, reaching 17.4 million viewers. The first season, which was shown on Tuesday nights in the United States, received mainly positive reviews and won several awards, including the People's Choice Award for Favorite New TV Drama, and averaged 10.4 million viewers per episode. Alba's portrayal of Max also received mostly positive reviews and several awards. For the second season, the show was moved to the less desirable air time of Friday night and received some criticism for new plot elements. It suffered from a drop in ratings, averaging 6 million viewers per episode, and was canceled.

A series of novels continued the storyline, and a video game adaptation was also released. Dark Angel is considered to have gothic and female empowerment themes; Max followed a long line of strong female characters in Cameron's work, including Sarah Connor and Ellen Ripley. Cameron was also influenced by the manga Battle Angel Alita. Dark Angel is considered to be part of a wave of shows in the late 1990s and early 2000s that feature strong female characters, alongside Xena: Warrior Princess, Buffy the Vampire Slayer, La Femme Nikita, and Alias.

== Plot ==
Season	Episodes	Originally released	
Season	Episodes	First released	Last released
1	22	October 3, 2000	May 22, 2001
2	21	September 28, 2001	May 3, 2002

=== Season one ===
In February 2009, a genetically enhanced nine-year-old female supersoldier designated as X5-452 (Geneva Locke) escapes along with eleven others from a secret U.S. government institution code-named Manticore, where they were born, raised, and trained to be soldiers and assassins. On June 1, 2009, months after the twelve X5s' escape, terrorists detonate an electromagnetic pulse weapon in the atmosphere over the U.S., which destroys the vast majority of computer and communication systems, throwing the country into chaos.

Ten years later in 2019, the now 19-year-old X5-452 (Jessica Alba), who calls herself Max Guevara, struggles to search for her Manticore brothers and sisters. In the recovering United States, which is now barely more than a developing country, she tries to live a relatively normal life and evade capture by Manticore, which wishes to recover its lost asset. Logan Cale (Michael Weatherly), an underground cyber-journalist with the alias Eyes Only, attempts to recruit her to help fight corruption in the post-Pulse world. She initially refuses but accepts after Cale is rendered a paraplegic while attempting the assignment for which he was attempting to recruit her. A romantic interest buds between the two. While assisting Cale, Max also makes a living as a bicycle messenger at Jam Pony, a courier company, along with her friends Original Cindy (Valarie Rae Miller), Herbal Thought (Alimi Ballard), and Sketchy (Richard Gunn). Other X5s are periodically introduced, most significantly the unit leader Zack (William Gregory Lee). The Manticore hunt for the escaped X5s is led by Colonel Donald Lydecker (John Savage). Near the end of the season, Lydecker is betrayed by his superior, the even more ruthless Elizabeth Renfro (Nana Visitor), and he defects from Manticore. He aids Max and Zack in an assault on Manticore headquarters. Max is badly wounded and captured. Zack, who has also been captured, commits suicide to provide Max with his heart, as she needs an X5 heart transplant to survive.

=== Season two ===
Cale exposes Manticore to the world. Renfro decides to burn the facility to cover up the evidence and is killed in the process. Aided by Joshua (Kevin Durand), a transgenic with conspicuous canine DNA, Max escapes the facility and frees the other transgenics, including Alec (Jensen Ackles), a fellow X5 and clone of Max's brother Ben (also Jensen Ackles) whom she was forced to kill in the first season, who later joins Jam Pony. When Max is reunited with Cale he immediately becomes ill and almost dies. Max discovers that Manticore has infected her with a virus specifically designed to kill Cale, and the two must avoid all physical contact to keep him alive. Max learns that Joshua was the first transgenic created by Sandeman, Manticore's founder. Over the course of the season, it is revealed that a millennia-old breeding cult has bred their own advanced humans who rival the Manticore-produced transgenics in their abilities. Ames White (Martin Cummins), a government agent tasked with eliminating the freed transgenics, is revealed to be a member of the cult. When a strange message written in Max's genetic code makes an appearance on her skin it is revealed that Sandeman is a renegade from the breeding cult and Ames White is his son. White is still loyal to the cult and hates his father's transgenic creations with a passion. Believing that the special sequences Sandeman buried in Max's DNA are a threat to the breeding cult's plans for the extinction of normal humanity, they attempt to kill her, but she escapes to Terminal City, an abandoned part of Seattle where hundreds of outcast transgenics have been hiding. When the police begin to surround Terminal City Max convinces the other transgenics to stand their ground rather than run. The series ends with the military surrounding Terminal City as the residents raise their newly designed flag from one of the buildings, and wait for a possible invasion.

== Cast and characters ==
The main characters of the first season from left to right: Col. Donald Lydecker, Kendra Maibaum, Calvin Simon "Sketchy" Theodore, Herbal Thought, Reagan "Normal" Ronald, Max Guevara, Logan Cale, and Cynthia "Original Cindy" McEachin.

The first season introduced Jessica Alba as the main character Max Guevara (X5-452), a genetically enhanced transgenic super-soldier who escaped from a government facility named Manticore. She works as a bike messenger for the courier company Jam Pony during the day and as a cat burglar at night. Michael Weatherly played Logan Cale, the show's second most prominent character. Cale is a wealthy cyber-journalist and vigilante who operates under the alias Eyes Only. He recruits Max to assist with his campaign against corruption and crime in return for helping her find information on her fellow Manticore escapees. Main roles were given to several of the couriers at Jam Pony, including Valarie Rae Miller as Cynthia "Original Cindy" McEachin, Richard Gunn as Calvin "Sketchy" Theodore, and Alimi Ballard as Herbal Thought. J. C. MacKenzie played Reagan "Normal" Ronald, the company's boss, and Jennifer Blanc played Kendra Maibaum, Max's first roommate, and John Savage played the main antagonist, Col. Donald Lydecker, who is trying to recapture Max and the other Manticore escapees.

The Lydecker character is written out of the series early in the second season, and Herbal Thought and Kendra Maibaum do not appear at all. Season two introduces Kevin Durand as Joshua, an experimental creature from Manticore who has distinct canine facial features. It also brings back Jensen Ackles as Alec McDowell (X5-494), who is an identical twin of Ben (X5-493), one of the original 12 escapees from Manticore, and introduces Ashley Scott as Asha Barlow, a resistance fighter who has a romantic interest in Cale. Martin Cummins portrayed the season's main antagonist Ames White, a National Security Agency agent tasked with destroying the Manticore escapees.

== Production ==
=== Background ===
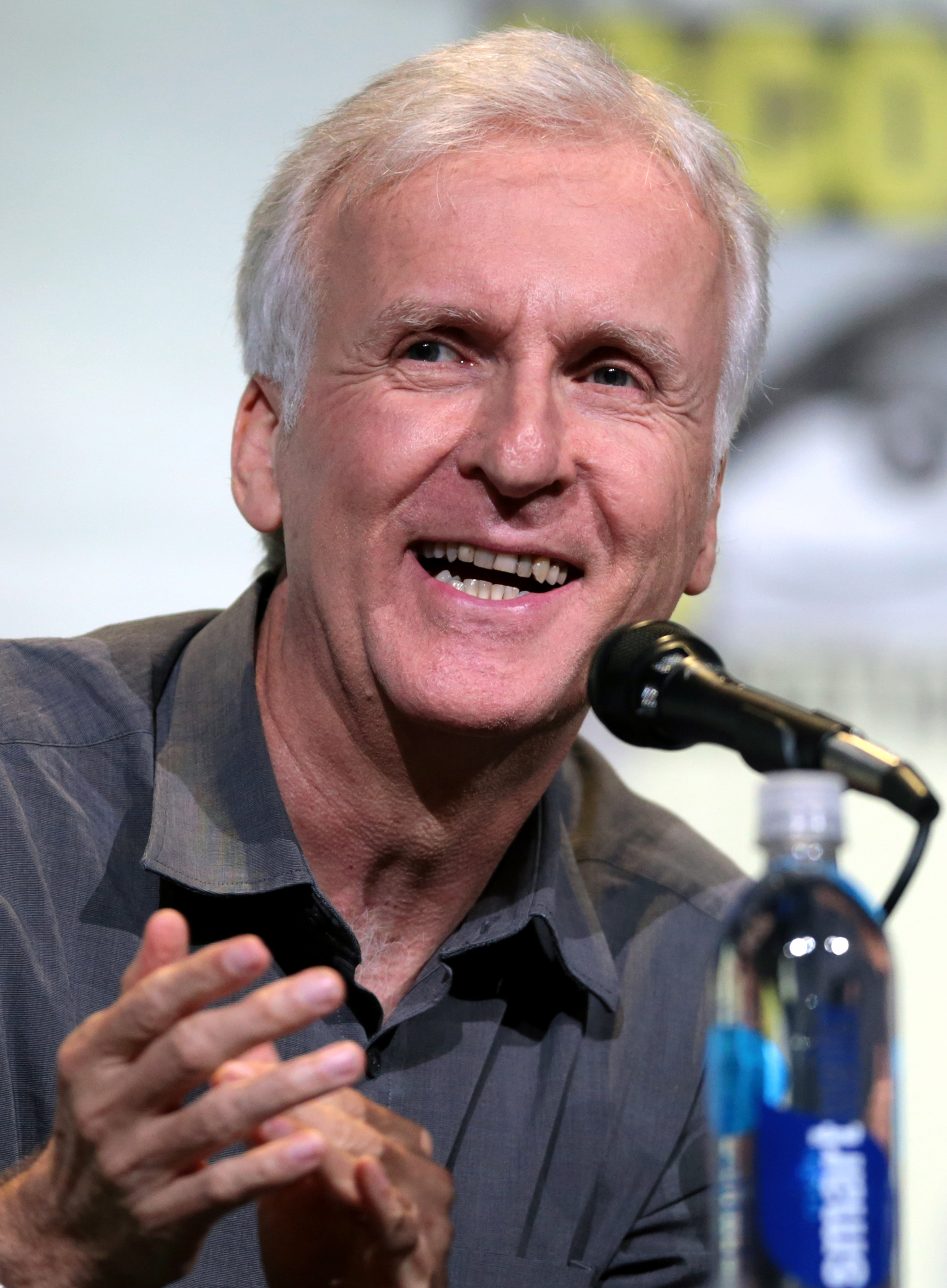
James Cameron (pictured in 2016) co-created the series with Charles H. Eglee.

Following his success with the film Titanic, director James Cameron teamed up with Charles H. Eglee with whom he had previously worked on projects including Piranha II: The Spawning. The two formed a production company, Cameron/Eglee Productions, and began working on ideas for a television series. They considered several options, including a family drama, before deciding on the idea of Dark Angel. Cameron said they began with the idea that Max would be a genetic construct who "looked normal on the outside but was different on the cellular, genetic level. We explore what that could mean." Cameron was influenced by the manga Battle Angel Alita, which he was originally intending to adapt into a film after completing Dark Angel.

Dark Angel would be the first and only work by Cameron/Eglee Productions. Max followed a long line of strong female characters in Cameron's work, including Sarah Connor and Ellen Ripley. Cameron said "it's a win/win situation" as "women respond to characters who appear strong and capable" and young male audiences "want to see girls kick ass". Later they decided to set the series in a post-social collapse world, saying that the hysteria surrounding Y2K served as inspiration; in the series, an electromagnetic pulse previously destroyed every computer in the United States. Working titles for the series included "Experimental Girl" and "Maximum Girl". The project marked Cameron's television debut; he worked mainly as a writer and executive producer for the series.

=== Casting and filming ===
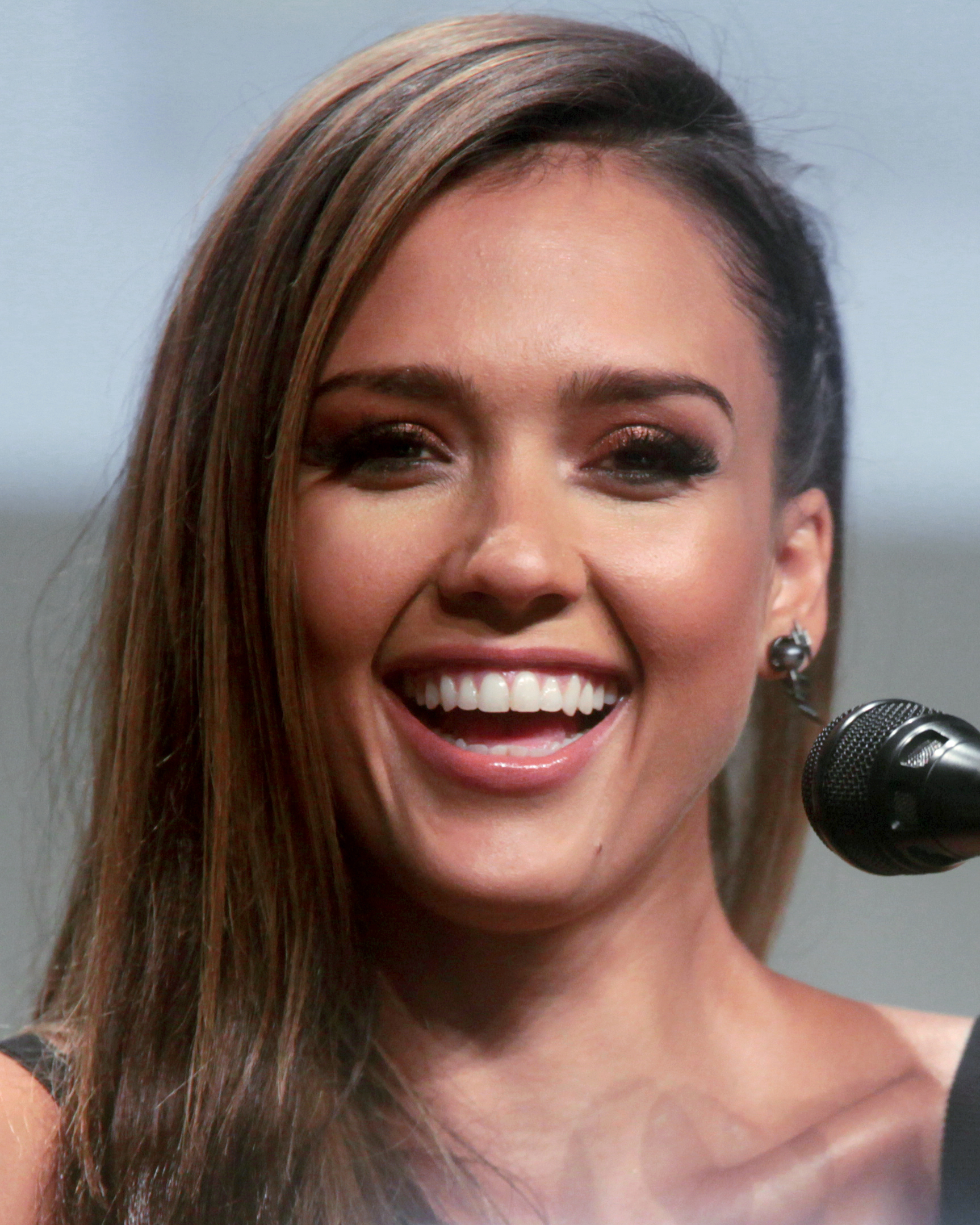
Jessica Alba (pictured in 2014) won the role of Max over more than 1,000 other actresses.

More than a thousand young actresses were considered for the part of Max. Cameron started reviewing audition tapes when the field had been narrowed down to twenty or thirty applicants. He was initially not impressed with Alba's audition tape, saying "she had her head down, she was reading out of the script ... she didn't present herself all that well. But there was something about the way she read the script that copped an attitude that I liked." Cameron continually reviewed the audition tapes but kept coming back to Alba's, eventually deciding that he needed to meet her. Alba was hired for the role before the script was written. Eglee said: "We had the benefit of being able to write a script kind of backward, we were writing for this actress, with her cadences and her rhythms and her sensibilities and her attitude and her slang." To train for the role, Alba spent a year doing martial arts and gymnastics and riding motorcycles.

The two-hour premiere episode cost up to $10 million to produce, and Cameron reportedly "brought the pilot in on time and on budget". Subsequent episodes had a considerably smaller budget. Fox spent heavily on the promotional campaign for the premiere, paying for theatrical trailers, billboards, and guerilla marketing. Cameron took a "very basic view" of the show's chance of success, saying: "If it flies, it flies. If it doesn't, it doesn't ... If people connect with it, which I hope they will, fine. If we don't find an audience, we deserve to be off the air. It's that simple." Eglee admitted the series had been "routinely over budget" in the first season, and feared that this would be a factor in whether or not the show was renewed for a second season, though Cameron downplayed these concerns.

Fox "just barely" renewed the series for a second season. The budget for episodes in season two was $1.3 million each. After the intended director of the final episode did not work out, Cameron decided to step in and fill the position. He did this partially for the experience but also to show the network the potential for a third season. It was his first experience directing a TV drama.

The producers were initially told a third season had been approved, but two days later Fox informed them that the series had been canceled.

They called us on Saturday and told us we were on schedule and we'd been picked up. We got together Saturday night and celebrated. Sunday goes by, and Monday morning we get a call saying, "No, you're not on the schedule! It's been changed." I've never heard of that happening. But then, I'd never been around television. ... We were supposed to be on a plane on Monday to go to the [network] upfront in New York on Tuesday. They called us that day and told us not to go! I was pissed!

— James Cameron

Dark Angel was set in Seattle, and filmed in Vancouver at Lions Gate Studios. Other filming locations included the Vancouver Art Gallery, as well as Buntzen Lake and Riverview Hospital, also in British Columbia.

=== Unproduced season ===
In the DVD commentary for "Freak Nation", the series finale, Charles H. Eglee explained what had been planned for season three. The intention was to bring together the storylines of seasons one ("Manticore") and two ("Breeding Cult") and reveal the mythology of Dark Angel. The season would reveal that thousands of years ago, Earth passed through a comet's tail which deposited viral material that killed 97% of the human race. The breeding cult preserved the survivors' genetic immunity so that when the comet returned, only members of the cult would survive. Sandeman, a cult member, and Max's creator betrayed the cult and decided to give this genetic immunity to the rest of humanity through Max, who would be the savior of the human race. There were multiple ideas on how to spread Max's immunity, including an air burst that would disperse the antibody through the atmosphere, or attaching the immunity to a common cold virus (Eglee detailed how a scene would show Original Cindy sneezing as part of the beginning of the immunity spread). This storyline is expanded upon in the final Dark Angel novel After the Dark though when the comet returns nobody falls ill, and it is believed that the cult simply had a false prediction.

=== Broadcast history ===
The first season premiered in the United States on Tuesday, October 3, 2000, from 9:00 pm until 11:00 pm. Fox had to obtain agreements from its affiliates to broadcast past 10:00 pm, as most of them air local news programs at this time. In subsequent weeks the show aired from 9:00 pm till 10:00 pm Tuesdays. During its first season, the show was preempted on several occasions, including by the 2000 World Series, the Billboard Music Awards and coverage of the presidential election. The frequent preemptions became a running joke on the set. Dark Angel's scheduled air time put it in direct competition with Angel on The WB. Critics debated which of the similarly named shows would dominate the time-slot. Jonathon Storm from Philadelphia Media Network believed that Dark Angel would prove victorious, while Brad Adgate, a research director at Horizon Media, predicted that Dark Angel would only initially take the lead in the ratings, as Angel's strong fanbase would prevail in the long run. Brad Turrell, executive vice-president of Network Communication for the WB conceded that the heavy promotion for Dark Angel would give it higher initial ratings at first but believed that as Angel was a "better show" it would not be affected long-term. Concerned that there might be confusion between the two shows, the WB took out a full page ad in TV Guide, which read "There is only ONE. David Boreanaz is ANGEL." Angel won the time slot when Fox moved the broadcast time of Dark Angel to 8:00 pm on Fridays for its second season, where it preceded the new series Pasadena.

The final episode of the series aired on May 3, 2002, as a special 90-minute episode. Dark Angel has been syndicated on Syfy and the El Rey Network in the United States and on E4 and the Horror Channel in the UK.

=== Music ===
The score for the Dark Angel pilot was composed and conducted by Joel McNeely. The pilot score track "Bicycle Ride" was used in the end credits for the duration of the series. The pilot score was released in full as part of the original publicity press kit, titled Dark Angel: Complete Score from the Dark Angel Pilot. The 37-track CD was for promotional use only and not for resale. McNeely returned to score the entire series, making frequent use of "grumbling timpani rolls, bass drum beats and shrill brass and violin crescendos that familiarly sketch the action arcs of the narrative." Traditional orchestral elements are integrated with innovative electronic sounds and female vocals to create a sense of Max's "otherworldliness", "haunting wind chimes, pseudo-Orientalist refrains and extenuated high-pitched eerie sounds" evoke Max's super-human abilities, and "driving hip hop bass beats with heavy percussive effects [and] high-pitched feedback and reverberation" convey Max's struggles with violence and her memories of Manticore. The theme song for the series was composed by Chuck D and Gary G-Wiz. Both McNeely and G-Wiz cited Dark Angel as an opportunity to push sonic boundaries; G-Wiz stated that Eglee and music supervisor Randy Gerston kept calling him and telling him to make the theme song "crazier". McNeely said scoring the series was "like the difference between jazz and classical music. I'm a jazz player, so Dark Angel is as free form and as weird as we want to get."

A soundtrack album consisting of hip-hop and R&B songs was released on April 23, 2002, through Artemis Records. Eglee explained that he and Cameron began with the idea that they could do a "hip hop youth ensemble thing", noting that "hip hop had become the dominant influence in the country [and] in the world" and that they saw an opportunity to give the future of Dark Angel the soundtrack of contemporary American popular culture. In the soundtrack's liner notes, Eglee writes:

Reminiscent of another time and place ... that part of the Bronx in the late 1970s known as Fort Apache: a place that for white America, defined lack and limitation, violence and hopelessness. What white Americans couldn't see or hear then was the beautiful thing being birthed there, which, years later, would come to be known as Hip Hop. ... This album remembers the foundations of Hip Hop as it contemplates its future.

Randy Gerston said that because of the near future setting of the series, he avoided any major hit songs as these would not sound futuristic. This gave them the opportunity to discover new talent instead. The album features predominately female hip-hop and neo soul artists whose lyrics typically "focus on the expression of female agency and power – particularly with regard to sexuality." It peaked at No. 50 on the Top Independent Albums chart. Jason Birchmeier of AllMusic gave the soundtrack three out of five stars. He noted the lack of major artists on the album and commented that it "seems to be a female-orientated soundtrack, perhaps because of the show's female lead character". Birchmeier said many of the songs were "quite impressive" and that it "exceeds your expectations for a television show soundtrack".

No.	Title	Music	Length
1.	"Dark Angel Theme"	Public Enemy & MC Lyte	3:07
2.	"My Neck, My Back"	Khia	3:42
3.	"Trouble Again"	Tricky & John Forté	4:26
4.	"No Dealz"	MC Lyte ft. Ericka Yancey	4:12
5.	"Bring It to Me"	Samantha Cole	3:14
6.	"Moving With U"	Q-Tip	3:23
7.	"Candy"	Foxy Brown ft. Kelis	3:43
8.	"Bad News"	Damizza ft. Shade Sheist & N.U.N.E.	3:55
9.	"The Life"	Mystic	3:32
10.	"Somethin' About This Music"	Abstract Rude & Tribe Unique	3:53
11.	"Things I've Seen"	The Spooks	4:35
12.	"The One"	Niki Haris	4:12
13.	"Bring It to Me" (Dark Angel Remix)	Samantha Cole	3:15
Total length:			49:09

== Themes ==
Dark Angel is considered to be in the cyberpunk genre. Writing in Reconstruction: Studies in Contemporary Culture, Lorna Jowett considered Dark Angel to be a "hybrid of science fiction, Gothic, and action" which incorporated forms and themes from all three genres. Jowett compared Dark Angel to the Gothic novel Frankenstein, saying that Max's genetic engineering makes her a "postmodern Frankenstein's monster, blurring boundaries between human and monster". Kathleen McConnell in Gothic Studies also compared Max's unconventional conception to Frankenstein's monster, and cited several other Gothic themes in the series. She states that Max fits the model of a Gothic heroine who "ostensibly appear[s] to be conforming to their accepted role within the patriarchy but who actually subvert the father's power at every possible occasion." In her book Post-feminist Impasses in Popular Heroine Television, Alison Horbury theorizes that Dark Angel, along with the shows Alias, La Femme Nikita, and Dollhouse have themes of abduction, physical and symbolic rape, motherlessness, and the discovery of a sister.

Several academics have considered Dark Angel to be part of a wave of shows in the late 90s and early 2000s including Buffy the Vampire Slayer, Xena: Warrior Princess, and La Femme Nikita that feature strong female characters. Writing in Science Fiction Film & Television, Clarice Butkus noted Max has been considered to be a "distinctly millennial post-third-wave feminist warrior. She also felt that Max's relationship and dialogue with Original Cindy, an African American lesbian, conveyed female empowerment. For example, Cindy encourages Max not to feel guilt over her sexual behaviour and instead to embrace a traditionally masculine approach to sex. McConnell and Jowett also cited Max as an example of female empowerment; Jowett considered Max to be the "usual postmodern, postfeminist representation of the female action hero with [at least] a reversal or [at most] a mixture of traditional gender traits."

Butkus stated that Dark Angel repeatedly paid homage to the film Blade Runner. Lydecker, the "flawed antagonist" of Dark Angel is said to be a transposition of Deckard, the "flawed hero" of Blade Runner. Alec McDowell/X5-494's love interest is named Rachel, believed to be a reference to the replicant Rachael, though in Dark Angel it is McDowell and not Rachel who is bio-engineered. His flashbacks of this traumatic relationship use piano music similar to that used in Blade Runner to denote memories and a desire for former times. Alec's genetic memory enhancements enable him, with only a few hours practice, to play a detailed piano piece by Frédéric Chopin, the composer originally scripted for the scene in Blade Runner where Rachael inexplicably finds herself able to play the piano; both characters are considered to be pre-programmed by state forces to master superhuman skills.

== Reception and legacy ==
Initial reaction to the series and Max's character was mostly positive, with favorable reviews in Rolling Stone and Time. Hal Boedeker of the Orlando Sentinel said: "Television's newest warrior woman possesses skills worthy of Catwoman, Xena, Emma Peel, and Wonder Woman." Howard Rosenberg said: "If pouty faces and sexy walks could destroy, the highly arresting Max would be wiping out the entire planet." However Joyce Millman said Max was "little more than lips and ass" and considered the series to be an expensive Britney Spears music video. People ran a negative review of the Pilot episode in October 2000, though in December they listed Alba's portrayal of Max as among the "breakthrough" performances of 2000.

The first episode was behind only CSI: Crime Scene Investigation as the most watched new show of the week, albeit in a week with fewer new shows because of the presidential debate coverage. Fox chose to debut Dark Angel instead of airing the first presidential debate, a move which TV analyst Marc Berman praised, saying: "The people who watch the debates aren't the people who'll tune into Dark Angel anyway", though he predicted that the premiere's high ratings would not hold up as the show competed against more varied competition in subsequent weeks. It was the tenth most popular show overall that week, attracting 17.4 million viewers. The first season averaged 10.4 million viewers per episode, ranking number 59 for the 2000–01 season. Cameron said he did not know if the broadcast time change for the second season would have a positive or negative effect on the show's ratings, though R. D. Heldenfels of the Sun Journal noted the poor ratings of Friday night television, especially the low viewing rates among 18 to 24-year-olds, the age-group that Dark Angel was most popular with. The new time slot saw a ratings drop; for the second season Dark Angel averaged 6 million viewers, ranking number 114 for the 2001–02 season in the Nielsen ratings. On the review aggregator website Rotten Tomatoes, the first seasons holds a score of 65% based on 23 reviews, with a critics consensus stating: "Jessica Alba does a solid job as a post-apocalyptic heroine in Dark Angel, a sleek – if somewhat predictable – cyberpunk show.

Commenting on the release of the second season, Cynthia Fuchs of PopMatters said the first season of Dark Angel was one of the "few straight-up successes, a ratings hit among the coveted 'youth' demographic." She praised the series but clarified: "I'm not getting carried away: Jim Cameron is not going to be making revolutionary art anytime soon." Michael Sauter of Entertainment Weekly gave the first season a B+ and spoke highly of Alba, saying that "for a while [she was] TV's hottest kick-butt heroine". Elka Karl of Common Sense Media gave the entire series 3 out of 5 stars, saying: "While the dialogue sometimes falls flat, overall the show is well-scripted and well acted, and Alba does an excellent job of carrying the series. Dark Angel isn't perfect by any stretch of the imagination, but it is compelling television that teen sci-fi fans will enjoy." While praising the first season, Randy Dankievitch of TVOvermind labelled the second season "silly", criticizing "dumb stories" like Max's dream episode "Boo", the virus that prevents Logan and Max having physical contact, and the various half-animal Manticore experiments that are revealed.

Writing in his book The Encyclopedia of Superheroes on Film and Television, John Kenneth Muir said it was necessary for Cameron to set Dark Angel in the future because the prosperity of the U.S. in 2000 "offered little possibility for crime, squalor and other societal problems". While criticizing certain plot elements in the second season as contributing to the show's downfall, Muir said that larger factors in ratings dropping were the September 11 attacks, the Enron scandal, and the depletion of the U.S. government's surplus, which changed Dark Angel's "futuristic vision of recession in a Third-World America" from an interesting, far-fetched premise to a "depressing reminder that things could still get worse".

In 2004, Max was ranked number 17 on TV Guide's list of the 25 Greatest Sci-Fi Legends, and in 2012, Dave Golder of GamesRadar ranked her number 49 on his list of the 100 sexiest women in sci-fi. In 2009, AfterEllen ranked Original Cindy number 6 on their list of the Top 11 Lesbian/Bi Sidekicks. In 2015, Kayti Burt of Den of Geek included Dark Angel at the top of her list of "10 Sci-Fi Shows That Don't Get Enough Love". In 2016, it was recognized that Dark Angel was the first American television series to feature an openly transgender actress playing a transgender character. In the season one episode "Out", transgender actress Jessica Crockett portrayed "Louise", a young woman on a date with Normal.

The 2007 film Hitman re-used footage of Max and other Manticore children in training from Dark Angel. It was used to portray the Hitman protagonist Agent 47, a cloned assassin who, like the Manticore children, has a barcode on the back of his head.

=== Accolades ===
In its first season Dark Angel won the Favorite Television New Dramatic Series award at the 27th People's Choice Awards, and was nominated for Best Television by the International Horror Guild Awards. The production team was nominated for the Excellence in Production Design Award by the Art Directors Guild. Editor Stephen Mark won Best Edited Motion Picture for Commercial Television at the Eddie Awards for the pilot episode, and the pilot was also nominated for Outstanding Special Visual Effects for the 53rd Primetime Emmy Awards and "Best Visual Effects: Dramatic Series" by the Leo Awards. Dark Angel was nominated for the 2001 Golden Reel Award for Best Sound Editing – Television Movies and Specials – Dialogue & ADR, and for Choice Drama at the 2001 Teen Choice Awards.

Jessica Alba won Best Actress on Television at the 27th Saturn Awards, Breakout Star of the Year at the TV Guide Awards, Outstanding Actress in a New Television Series at the ALMA Awards, and Choice Actress at the 2001 Teen Choice Awards. She also received nominations for Best Actress – Television Series Drama for the 58th Golden Globe Awards and Best Performance in a TV Drama Series – Leading Young Actress for the 22nd Young Artist Awards.

Dark Angel was nominated for fewer awards in its second season. It was nominated for Choice Drama/Action Adventure for the 2002 Teen Choice Awards, where Alba was also nominated for Choice Actress, Drama. Alba was also nominated for Outstanding Actress in a Television Series for the ALMA Awards. At the Leo Awards the episode "Boo" received a nomination for Best Visual Effects: Dramatic Series, and David Geddes won Best Cinematography: Dramatic Series for the episode "Two".

Year	Event	Award	Nominee	Result
2000	27th Saturn Awards	Best Actress on Television	Jessica Alba	Won
2000	58th Golden Globe Awards	Best Actress – Television Series Drama	Jessica Alba	Nominated
2001	22nd Young Artist Awards	Best Performance in a TV Drama Series – Leading Young Actress	Jessica Alba	Nominated
2001	27th People's Choice Awards	Favorite Television New Dramatic Series	Dark Angel	Won
2001	53rd Primetime Emmy Awards	Outstanding Special Visual Effects for a Series (for Pilot episode)	Special effects team	Nominated
2001	2001 Teen Choice Awards	TV – Choice Actress	Jessica Alba	Won
2001	2001 Teen Choice Awards	TV – Choice Actor	Michael Weatherly	Nominated
2001	2001 Teen Choice Awards	TV – Choice Drama	Dark Angel	Nominated
2001	ALMA Award	Outstanding Actress in a New Television Series	Jessica Alba	Nominated
2001	Art Directors Guild	Excellence in Production Design Award	Production team	Nominated
2001	Eddie Award	Best Edited Motion Picture for Commercial Television (for Pilot episode)	Stephen Mark	Won
2001	International Horror Guild Award	Best Television	Dark Angel	Nominated
2001	Leo Awards	Best Visual Effects: Dramatic Series (for Pilot episode)	Visual effects team	Nominated
2001	TV Guide Award	Breakout Star of the Year	Jessica Alba	Won
2001	TV Guide Award	Actress of the Year in a New Series	Jessica Alba	Nominated
2001	Golden Reel Award	Best Sound Editing – Television Movies and Specials – Dialogue & ADR	Sound team	Nominated
2002	28th Saturn Awards	Best Network Television Series	Dark Angel	Nominated
2002	28th Saturn Awards	Best Actress in a Television Series	Jessica Alba	Nominated
2002	28th Saturn Awards	Best Supporting Actor in a Television Series	Michael Weatherly	Nominated
2002	2002 Teen Choice Awards	TV – Choice Drama/Action Adventure	Dark Angel	Nominated
2002	2002 Teen Choice Awards	TV – Choice Actress, Drama	Jessica Alba	Nominated
2002	ALMA Award	Outstanding Actress in a Television Series	Jessica Alba	Nominated
2002	Leo Awards	Best Visual Effects: Dramatic Series (for episode "Boo")	Visual effects Team	Nominated
2002	Leo Awards	Best Cinematography: Dramatic Series (for episode "Two")	David Geddes	Won

== Home media ==
20th Century Fox Home Entertainment released seasons 1 and 2 of Dark Angel on DVD in region 1 (R1), as well as a dual-coded region 2 and 4 (R2/4) set in 2003, as six-disc sets packaged in cardboard sleeves containing three DVD cases each of two discs. Season 1 was released in R2/4 in February and R1 in May, and season 2 was released in R2/4 in June and R1 in October.

The R1 releases contain several special features, including four episodes with optional commentary in each season, bloopers, deleted scenes, and featurettes. The R2/4 releases contain no commentaries and fewer other special features, but the episodes are presented in anamorphic widescreen, while R1 releases are fullscreen. Adam Tyner of DVD Talk gave the R1 first season three out of five stars for audio and video, and three and a half stars for special features. Shannon Nutt of DVD Talk gave the R1 second season three stars out of five for audio and video, and two and a half stars for extras, stating: "it appears [to have] a decent number of features, but then you discover the length of each one and really feel short-changed by Fox". She also noted the episode's commentary was mainly by writers and producers, and did not feature James Cameron or any of the actors.

Both seasons were re-released in R1 on June 5, 2007, with slim packaging consisting of one plastic case containing all six discs (which were unchanged in content and cosmetics).

== Related media ==
A video game of the same name based on the series was developed by Radical Entertainment, published by Sierra Entertainment and released for PlayStation 2 on November 18, 2002, and later on Xbox. Alba and Weatherly voiced their respective characters in the game. Development of the game started before the series was cancelled, and the game was met with mixed to negative reception upon release. Brett Todd of GameSpot gave the game 3.8 out of 10, saying: "Although it's impossible to say whether or not the developers' morale was affected by the cancellation of the series, this third-person action adventure plays like it was cranked out to fulfill a contract" and concluded "the development of this game probably should have been cancelled at the same time as the television series". Duke Ferris from Game Revolution gave the game a 'D+', saying that while fans of Dark Angel would enjoy it as it "mirrors an episode of the show almost exactly", anybody else was likely to find it boring.

Three original novels written by Max Allan Collins expand upon the Dark Angel television series, with two picking up directly where the series ended, and another serving as a prequel. A companion book, Dark Angel: The Eyes Only Dossier, was written by D.A. Stern.

- Dark Angel: Before the Dawn (2002) is a prequel to the television series, detailing Max's life after her escape from Manticore in 2009. After witnessing footage taken in Seattle of a man she believes to be one of her X5 siblings, Max moves from Los Angeles to Seattle, meeting Original Cindy and Kendra on the way, before finding employment at Jam Pony. Max eventually discovers the man in the footage is her brother Seth, who unbeknown to her has been working for Logan as a personal agent. Shortly after being reunited with him at the Space Needle, Seth, who has been injured, commits suicide by falling from it to avoid being captured by Lydecker. Max begins returning to the Space Needle to think and "to be with Seth".
- Dark Angel: Skin Game (2003) immediately follows the events of "Freak Nation", the final episode of season two, describing days in May 2021. Skin Game focuses on a killer terrorizing the streets of Seattle and the growing suspicion and evidence that the killer could be transgenic. As the killings escalate, the U.S. Army and National Guard prepare themselves for an invasion of Terminal City. Max uncovers that the killer is a shapeshifting transgenic named Kelpy, though he has been unwillingly given a drug by Ames White that is causing his psychosis. When Max reveals this information to the public through Eyes Only, Ames White goes into hiding, and the invasion of Terminal City is called off. When Kelpy takes on Logan's form he is killed by the virus Max carries which was designed to kill Logan.
- Dark Angel: After the Dark (2003) follows Skin Game. It is revealed that Max's virus is gone, the most likely explanation being that when the virus killed Kelpy it went dormant as it believed its mission to kill Logan was accomplished. However, Logan and Max's relationship is thrown into turmoil when he reveals that he inadvertently caused Seth's death by sending him on an assignment. Just as Max is ready to forgive him, Logan is kidnapped by Ames White and the breeding cult, who are preparing for the coming of a comet they believe will destroy everyone except cult-members and transgenics through depositing viral material into Earth's atmosphere. They are trying to kill Max as they believe she possesses a genetic code that will save ordinary humans from the comet's viral material. With the aid of a team of transgenics, Max eventually rescues Logan and destroys the headquarters of the breeding cult; Joshua kills Ames White. When the comet arrives, nobody falls ill, and it is believed the cult's prediction was false. Max finds Lydecker in a prison cell at the cult's headquarters. He promises to help her find her mother if she saves him, and she agrees. The book ends with Logan and Max finally consummating their relationship.

The companion book, Dark Angel: The Eyes Only Dossier, begins with a letter written by Logan Cale during the stand-off at Terminal City. It is addressed to Detective Matt Sung, a recurring character from the series who aides Logan, instructing him that the package he is sending him contains documents pertaining to the four most critical Eyes Only investigations. If he is killed by the potential invasion of Terminal City, Logan wants Sung to carry on the investigations. The rest of the book contains the documents relating to the four investigations.
