= S.I.O.S.O.S. Volume One =

Studio album by Spooks
- Released: February 8, 2000
- Recorded: 1999
- Studios: Various: The Cutting Room (New York City); No Mystery Studios (New York City); The Rug Room (Neptune, New Jersey); Skyelab Studios (New York City); Unique Recording Studios (New York City)
- Genre: Hip hop
- Length: 64:47
- Labels: Antra; Artemis; Sony
- Producers: Dan Askew; Rick Dahrouge; Kay-Gee; Odyssey; Sedni-Fi; Spooks

Spooks chronology
S.I.O.S.O.S. Volume One (2000)	Faster Than You Know... (2003)

Singles from S.I.O.S.O.S. Volume One
- 1. "Sweet Revenge" Released: 2000; 2. "Things I've Seen" Released: February 29, 2000; 3. "Karma Hotel" Released: 2001

S.I.O.S.O.S. Volume One is the debut album by American hip-hop group Spooks, released on February 8, 2000, by Antra, Artemis and Sony Music. The title is an initialism for "Spooks Is On Some Other Shit". The album launched the single "Things I've Seen", which charted at number 11 on Billboard's Hot Rap Singles chart and number 94 on the Hot R&B/Hip-Hop Singles & Tracks chart as well as went to number 1 in Europe and United States became the most played song internationally from 2001 to 2002. Spooks went gold in 5 countries and became eligible for a European and North American platform plaque. Spooks eventually sold several million records.

== Critical reception ==
Professional ratings
Review scores
Source	Rating
AllMusic	2/5 stars
Dotmusic	8/10
Entertainment.ie	3/5 stars
laut.de	3/5 stars
Muzik	5/5 stars
NME	6/10
RapReviews	7/10

S.I.O.S.O.S. garnered a mixed reception from music critics. Steve 'Flash' Juon of RapReviews found some songs of lesser quality and the rappers' voices to be nondescript, but gave praise to tracks like "Sweet Revenge", "Karma Hotel" and "Jungle House" for their haunting experimental beats and use of Ming Xia's vocals, concluding that: "Whether you buy into their claim that they represent a totally new direction in hip-hop or not, it's not hard to enjoy the positive aspects of this album - it's hip-hop, well done." A writer from Entertainment.ie also praised the group's mixture of hip hop and soul music with Ming Xia's chorus delivery, but was critical of their comedy skits and views on the music industry, concluding that: "If the Spooks cut out the foolery and focus on their musical talent, which on this evidence is considerable, they could go far." Jim Alexander of NME commended the Fugees and RZA influences found throughout the various tracks, and singled out the group's singer Ming Xia for "adding a touch of steely R&B modernism, a welcome female counterpoint, and enough hook-laden soul to catapult them into the big time." Vibe contributor Jon Caramanica said that despite Ming Xia's appearance throughout the record, he criticized the rappers traversing from different topics and styles as being "disorienting", concluding that: "S.I.O.S.O.S. compromises compelling parts that never yield a revolutionary whole." AllMusic editor Steve Kurutz said of the album: "S.I.O.S.O.S. (Spooks Is on Some Other Shit) is an eclectic mix of jazz, reggae, hip-hop, and neo-soul, and it's also not that good. Spooks consist of four gruff, male MCs and female singer Ming Xia, but five is truly a crowd and often the arrangements are so cluttered that the vocalists trip over themselves and interrupt each other like overeager grade-schoolers."

== Track listing ==
All lyrics are written by Joseph M. Davis, Chenjerai Kumanyika, Irina M. Perez, Jerel Spruill and Booker T. Tucker.

No.	Title	Producer	Length
1.	"Other Script"	Odyssey	5:16
2.	"The Mission"	Odyssey	3:35
3.	"Things I've Seen"	Rick Dahrouge	4:33
4.	"They Don't Know"	Sedni-Fi; Spooks^{[a]}	5:17
5.	"I Got U"	Sedni-Fi; Spooks^{[a]}	4:04
6.	"Flesh Not Bone"	Kay-Gee	3:57
7.	"Sweet Revenge"	Spooks	5:58
8.	"Deep Cutz"	Sedni-Fi; Spooks^{[a]}	4:13
9.	"Karma Hotel"	Spooks	5:01
10.	"Safe House"	Odyssey	4:42
11.	"Something Fresh"	Dahrouge	4:14
12.	"Swindley's Maracas"	Dan Askew	4:58
13.	"Bitch Blood"	Askew	4:43
14.	"Murder"	Dahrouge	4:12

- ^{^[a]} signifies a co-producer.

Sample credits

- "Other Script" contains a sample of "Say It with Silence" written and performed by Hubert Laws.
- "Safe House" contains an interpolation of "Calling You", written by Bob Telson, performed by Jevetta Steele.
- "Something Fresh" contains an interpolation of "Mama Used to Say", written by Bob Carter and Norman Giscombe, performed by Junior.

== Personnel ==
Adapted from the liner notes of S.I.O.S.O.S. Volume One.

Spooks

- Booka-T
- Hypno
- Ming Xia
- Vengeance
- Water Water

Additional musicians

- Dan Askew – guitar (track 12)
- Rick Dahrouge – keyboards, guitar, bass (tracks 3, 11, 14)
- Randy Feinberg – guitar (track 14)
- Lawrence Griffith – bass guitar (tracks 7 and 9)
- Jay "Rock" Kulikowski – drums (tracks 3, 11, 14)
- Pete Mitchell – drums (tracks 7, 9)
- Vladimir Narcisse – keyboards (tracks 7, 9)
- Irina M. Perez – keyboards (tracks 7, 11)
- Charmel Rogers – guitar (tracks 7, 9)

Production

- Jeff Abell – engineer, mixing engineer
- Eric Agosto – assistant engineer (tracks 1, 2)
- Al Boogie – engineer (tracks 12, 13)
- Cheek – mixing engineer (track 3)
- Daryl Dahrouge – engineer (tracks 3, 7, 9, 11, 14)
- Greg Frentzen – assistant mixing engineer (track 3)
- Herb Powers – mastering engineer
- Tim Wayne – engineer (tracks 1, 2)

Artwork

- Toupee – art direction and design
- James Hicks – photography

== Charts ==
Chart performance for S.I.O.S.O.S. Volume One
Chart (2001)	Peak position
Austrian Albums (Ö3 Austria)	39
Belgian Albums (Ultratop Flanders)	19
Dutch Albums (Album Top 100)	94
French Albums (SNEP)	55
German Albums (Offizielle Top 100)	73
New Zealand Albums (RMNZ)	36
Swiss Albums (Schweizer Hitparade)	73
UK Albums (Official Charts)	25
UK R&B Albums (Official Charts)	3

== Certifications ==
Certifications for S.I.O.S.O.S. Volume One
Region	Certification	Certified units/sales
France	—	60,000
United Kingdom (BPI)	Gold	100,000^{^}
United States	—	14,003
