= List of programs broadcast by The CW Plus =

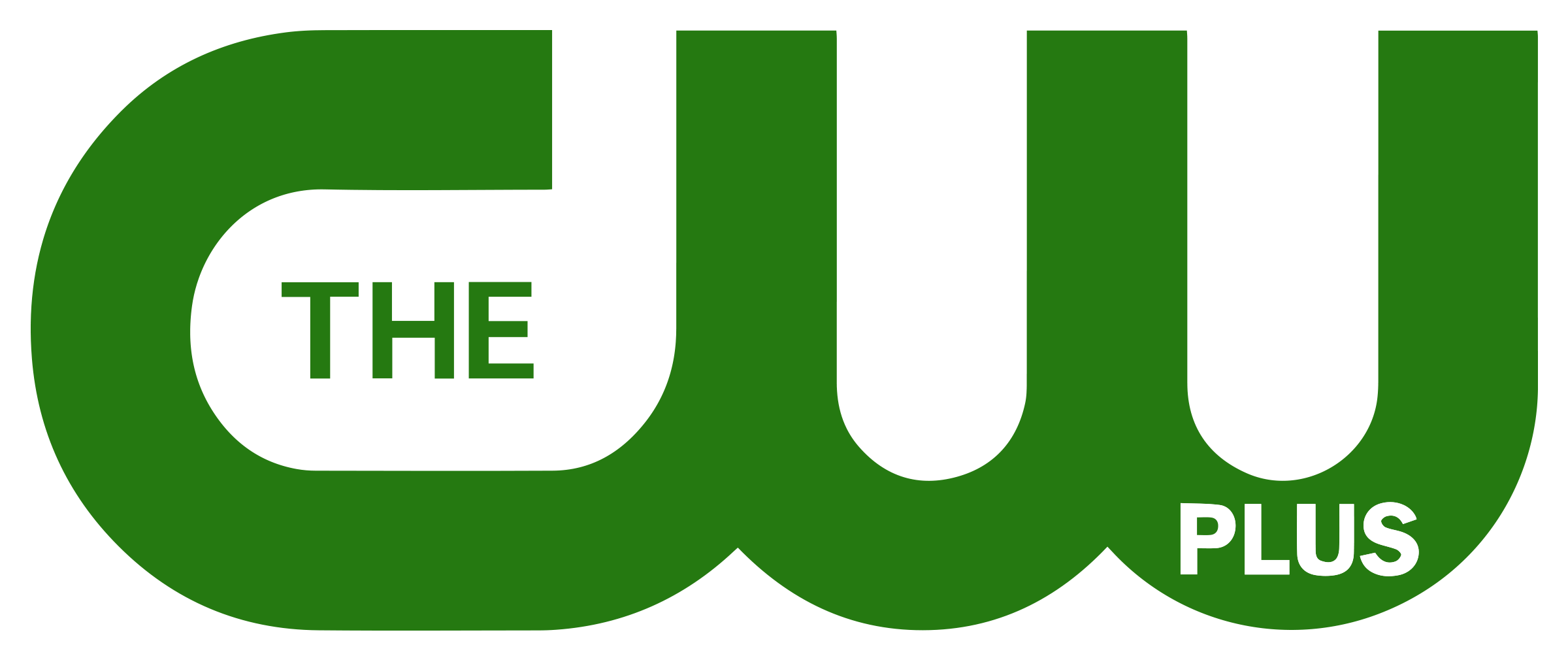

The following is a list of programs which have been or are soon to be broadcast on The CW Plus, a specialized programming service mainly available in media markets ranked above #100 by Nielsen, which provides a master schedule of network content from parent television network The CW and acquired programs distributed for syndication that fill time periods not allocated to network programming (some of which were originally acquired by predecessor service The WB 100+ Station Group, prior to the announcement of The CW's launch and the shutdowns of The WB and UPN).

Some programming may be pre-empted and replaced with alternate programming if another station in a certain market contracts to carry that program or are within the network's local news windows, and local deviations and programming from the master schedule are not noted here.

== Current programming ==
=== Comedies ===
- Friends (2024)

=== Dramas ===
- Chicago P.D. (2022)

=== Reality/other ===
- Bloodline Detectives (2020)
- Divorce Court (2021)
- Dish Nation (2023)
- Heart of the Nation Sunday (Catholic) Mass
- Highway Thru Hell (2021)
- In Touch Ministries (2006)
- Karamo (2022)
- The Liquidator (2021)
- Maury (2017)
- Made in Hollywood (2011)
- Manna Fest with Perry Stone
- Moviefone TV (2021)
- The Key of David (2006)
- The Steve Wilkos Show (2007)
- To the Rescue (2020)
- TMZ on TV (2023)
- TMZ Live (2023)
- True Crime News (2024)
- Lauren Lake's Paternity Court (2024)
- Tomorrow's World (2006)
- Women of Wrestling (2022)
- We the People (2022)

== Former programming ==
=== Drama ===
- Agents of S.H.I.E.L.D. (2016–17)
- The Border (2012–13)
- Cold Case (2009–11)
- Cold Squad (2006–11)
- Da Vinci's Inquest (2008–11)
- The Dead Zone (2007–09)
- Dead Like Me (2007–09)
- Elementary (2017–20)
- Farscape (2006–08)
- The Good Doctor (2022–24)
- Heartland (2010–12, 2016–17)
- House (2010–12)
- Jeremiah (2007–08)
- The Listener (2018–20)
- MacGyver (2021–22)
- Masterminds (2006–07)
- Murdoch Mysteries (2014–15)
- The Outer Limits (2009–11)
- The Pinkertons (2014–15)
- Poltergeist: The Legacy (2007-08)
- Rookie Blue (2015–18)
- ReGenesis (2007–10)
- Saving Hope (2017–19)
- The Shield (2006–08)
- Stone Undercover (2006–08)
- Stargate Atlantis (2010–11)
- Stargate SG-1 (2008–09)
- Stargate Universe (2010–11)
- Star Wars: The Clone Wars (2012–13)
- True Blood (2012–14)

=== Comedy ===
- American Dad! (2015–19)
- Are We There Yet? (2012–16)
- The Bernie Mac Show (2006–10)
- Black-ish (2018–23)
- Bob's Burgers (2015–24)
- The Cleveland Show (2013–19)
- Community (2013–16)
- Cougar Town (2014–16)
- The Cosby Show (2006–11)
- Comedy.TV (2009–10)
- The Drew Carey Show (2008–09)
- Family Guy (2015–24)
- Girls Behaving Badly (2006–08)
- The Goldbergs (2017–22)
- Just Shoot Me! (2014–15)
- King of the Hill (2013–19)
- The King of Queens (2006–19)
- Mad About You (2006–07)
- Meet the Browns (2010–14)
- Married... with Children (2008–11, 2015)
- The Nanny (2006–07)
- Raising Hope (2014–17)
- Reba (2009–10)
- Roseanne (2006–12)
- Rules of Engagement (2012–19)
- Schitt's Creek (2020–22)
- Seinfeld (2011–21)
- Sex and the City (2006–09)
- South Park (2010–12)
- Sony Wheel Of Comedy (2014)
- Still Standing (2006–09)
- That 70's Show (2008–14)
- 'Til Death (2011–14)
- Tyler Perry's House of Payne (2008–14)
- Will & Grace (2006–08)

=== Reality/other ===
- America's Funniest Home Videos (2009–13)
- American Ninja Warrior (2018-22)
- American Idol Rewind (2008–10)
- Better (2011–15)
- The Brian McKnight Show (2009–10)
- Campmeeting
- Caught in Providence (2022-23)
- Championship Wrestling from Hollywood (2017–18)
- Cheaters (2006–17, 2018–19)
- Christian Worship Hour
- Central Ave (2020-21)
- Cops (2006–13, 2017–20)
- Cops Reloaded (2013–17)
- Crazy Talk (2015–16)
- The Daily Buzz (2006–14)
- Don't Forget the Lyrics! (2010–11)
- E! True Hollywood Story (2010–12)
- Family Court with Judge Penny (2008–09)
- The Game Plane (2014–15)
- Garner Ted Armstrong (2006–16)
- The Greg Behrendt Show (2006–07)
- Intelligence for Your Life (2014–16)
- In Search of the Lord's Way (2006–17)
- The Jeremy Kyle Show (2011–13)
- Jerry Springer (2016–20, 2023-24)
- Judge Alex (2016–17)
- Judge Jerry (2019-23)
- Judge Maria Lopez (2006–08)
- Know The Cause with Doug Kaufman (2008–12)
- Live PD Police Patrol (2019–20)
- Nightwatch (2020-21)
- Nick Cannon (2021-22)
- Page Six TV (2017–19)
- Punk'd (2008-10)
- Sheriffs El Dorado County (2017–20)
- Smash Cuts (2009–11)
- SSN Sports (2020-23)
- Stag: A Test of Love (2008–09)
- Style by Jury (2008-09)
- Troubadour, TX (2011-12)
- True Crime Files (2018-19)
- The Wendy Williams Show (2012–14)
- Top 30 (2017-19)
- Who Wants to Be a Millionaire (2020-21)

=== Children's programming ===
- Animal Science ^{E/I} (2012-14)
- Beakman's World ^{E/I} (2006–07)
- Critter Gitters ^{E/I} (2006–07)
- Chatroom ^{E/I} (2012-14)
- Degrassi: The Next Generation ^{E/I} (2007–11)
- Elizabeth Stanton's Great Big World ^{E/I} (2011–16)
- Edgemont ^{E/I} (2010-11)
- Gladiators 2000 ^{E/I} (2008-10)
- Kid Guides ^{E/I} (2006–07)
- Live Life and Win ^{E/I} (2011–15)
- Made in Hollywood: Teen Edition ^{E/I} (2011–15)
- On the Spot ^{E/I} (2011–15)
- Real Life 101 ^{E/I} (2006–07)
- Ultimate Choice ^{E/I} (2006–07)
- Wild LTD ^{E/I} (2011-12)

== See also ==
- List of programs broadcast by The CW
- List of programs broadcast by The WB 100+ Station Group
