= Valarie Rae Miller =

American actress

- Occupations: Actress, host
- Years active: 1993–present

Valarie Rae Miller is an American actress and television host.

== Early life ==
Valarie Rae Miller became interested in acting when she was quite young. She attended a high school for the performing arts and landed a number of high-profile commercials while still in college.

On summer vacation in Los Angeles, Miller took a course in stand-up comedy and went on to perform at such well-known clubs as The Improv and The Comedy Store. Despite offers to go on tour with her stand-up routine, Miller decided to move to Los Angeles and pursue acting.

== Acting career ==
Miller is best known for her role as Cynthia "Original Cindy" McEachin in Dark Angel (2000–2002). She hosted two game shows; one was the second season of Gladiators 2000, replacing Maria Sansone; the other was (along with Nick Spano) Peer Pressure. In 1998 until 2000, she also hosted Disney's One Saturday Morning on ABC. From Fall 2007 to May 2009, Miller appeared in the TV drama Reaper on The CW. She also appeared in Crank, in the NCIS episode "Reunion", and in the Netflix film Reality High. She voiced Tiffany Fox, Lucius Fox's daughter, in Batman: The Enemy Within. She voices Wish Bear in Care Bears: Unlock the Magic on Boomerang. She also had a part in the 2002 film All About the Benjamins starring Ice Cube and Mike Epps.

== Filmography ==
=== Film ===
Year	Title	Role	Notes
1996	The Disappearance of Kevin Johnson	Rudi	
2000	Bear to the Right	Girlfriend	Short
2002	All About the Benjamins	Pam	
2003	Hollywood Homicide	Sartain Receptionist	
2006	Crank	Chocolate	
2009	Thank You for Washing	Lauren	Short
2013	Shoes!	Lefty (voice)	Short
2015	Liza, Liza, Skies Are Grey	Teresa	
2016	La La Land	Amy Brandt	
2017	Reality High	Mrs. Barnes	
2021	Dog Cop 7: The Final Chapter	Lieutenant Linda (voice)	Short
2023	Under the Boardwalk	Townie Crab/Neon Crab (voice)	

=== Television ===
Year	Title	Role	Notes
1993	Family Matters	Helen	Episode: "Car Wars"
1997	Malcolm & Eddie	Katrina	Episode: "Jugglin'"
1997	Hollywood Confidential	C.C.	Television film
1997–1998	In the House	Paula	2 episodes
1997–2000	One Saturday Morning	MeMe	Host
2000–2002	Dark Angel	Cynthia "Original Cindy" McEachin	Main cast (42 episodes)
2006	Smith	Macy	4 episodes
2007–2008	Reaper	Josie Miller	Main cast (18 episodes)
2009	Life	Erin Cordette	Episode: "Shelf Life"
2009	NCIS	Agent Bryn Fillmore	Episode: "Reunion"
2009–2011	Men of a Certain Age	Alexis	5 episodes
2014	Mixology	Starr	Episode: "Cal & Kacey"
2019–2023	Care Bears: Unlock the Magic	Wish Bear/Togetherness Bear (voice)	2 episodes
2021	Shameless	Judge Ilene	Episode: "Judge Ilene"
2023	Young Love	Additional Voices	2 episodes

=== Video games ===
Year	Title	Role
2017-18	Batman: The Enemy Within	Tiffany Fox (voice)
