= Spooks (group) =

American hip hop band

- Origin: Philadelphia, Pennsylvania, U.S. Brooklyn, New York City, U.S.
- Genre: Hip hop
- Years active: 1994–2006
- Labels: Artemis; Antra; Koch; Epic
- Past members: Booka-T; Hypno; Ming-Xia; Joe Davis; Water-Water (deceased)

Spooks was an American hip-hop group, active from the mid-1990s to the mid-2000s. The members of the group got together in 1994, taking their name from the 1969 novel by Sam Greenlee, The Spook Who Sat by the Door.

== Career ==
After attaining success throughout Europe and North America with their album S.I.O.S.O.S., Vol. 1, Spooks garnered a hit with the single, "Things I've Seen", which featured in the Laurence Fishburne film Once in the Life (2000) as well as the intro for the European version of the American TV series Dark Angel. Shortly afterwards, Spooks followed up with the number 16 on the top 40 charts hit "Karma Hotel." Back home in America, "Things I've Seen" hit number 11 on the hip hop singles charts and "Sweet Revenge" hit number 6 on the R&B singles charts. Water-Water left the group before their second album Faster Than You Know, and died in a car accident in September 2003, days before the album's release.

== Discography ==
=== Albums ===
Year	Album details	Peak chart positions								Certifications
Year	Album details	AUT	BEL	FRA	GER	NLD	NZ	SWI	UK	Certifications
S.I.O.S.O.S. Volume One	Released: February 8, 2000; Label: Antra, Artemis, Epic; Formats: CD, LP, cassette	39	19	55	73	94	36	73	25	BPI: Gold
Faster Than You Know...	Released: September 23, 2003; Label: Koch; Formats: CD, LP, cassette	—	—	—	—	—	—	—	—	

=== Singles ===
Title	Year	Peak chart positions										Album
Title	Year	AUT	BEL	DEN	FRA	GER	ITA	NLD	SWE	SWI	UK	Album
"Sweet Revenge"	2000	—	—	—	—	—	—	—	—	—	67	S.I.O.S.O.S. Volume One
"Things I've Seen"	2000	4	6	10	4	24	28	10	8	10	6	S.I.O.S.O.S. Volume One
"Karma Hotel"	2001	—	34	—	55	83	—	65	48	78	15	S.I.O.S.O.S. Volume One
"Yes"	2001	—	—	—	—	—	—	—	—	—	—	Non-album singles
"I Believe"	2001	—	—	—	—	—	—	—	—	—	—	Non-album singles
"Swindley's Maracas"	2001	—	—	—	—	—	—	—	—	—	—	S.I.O.S.O.S. Volume One
"Faster Than You Know"	2003	—	—	—	—	—	—	—	—	—	117	Faster Than You Know...
"Still Gonna Do It"	2003	—	—	—	—	—	—	—	—	—	—	Faster Than You Know...
"Crazy"	2003	—	—	—	—	—	—	—	—	—	—	Faster Than You Know...
"Change"	2003	—	—	—	—	—	—	—	—	—	—	Faster Than You Know...
"Don't Be Afraid"	2003	—	—	—	—	—	—	—	—	—	—	Faster Than You Know...
