= 27th People's Choice Awards =

Pop culture award show held in 2001

- Date: January 7, 2001
- Location: Shrine Auditorium, Los Angeles, California
- Hosted by: Kevin James

Television/radio coverage
- Network: CBS

The 27th People's Choice Awards, honoring the best in popular culture for 2000, were held on January 7, 2001, at the Shrine Auditorium in Los Angeles, California. They were hosted by Kevin James, and broadcast on CBS.

== Awards ==
Winners are listed first, in bold.

Favorite New TV Comedy	Favorite Female Musical Performer
**Ed**; Bette; The Geena Davis Show	**Faith Hill**; Shania Twain; Britney Spears
Favorite Drama Motion Picture	Favorite Comedy Motion Picture
**The Green Mile**; Remember the Titans; The Patriot	**Meet the Parents**; Nutty Professor II: The Klumps; Scary Movie
Favorite Male TV Performer	Favorite Male Musical Performer
**Drew Carey – The Drew Carey Show**; Kelsey Grammer – Frasier; Ray Romano – Everybody Loves Raymond	**Garth Brooks**; Ricky Martin; George Strait
Favorite Musical Group Or Band	Favorite Reality Based Show
***NSYNC**; Dixie Chicks; Alabama	**Survivor**; Cops; The Real World
Favorite Female Performer In A New TV Series	Favorite Female TV Performer
**Bette Midler – Bette**; Jessica Alba – Dark Angel; Geena Davis – The Geena Davis Show	**Jennifer Aniston – Friends**; Calista Flockhart – Ally McBeal; Jenna Elfman – Dharma & Greg
Favorite Motion Picture Actor	Favorite TV Comedy
**Mel Gibson – The Patriot & What Women Want**; Tom Hanks – Cast Away; Denzel Washington – Remember the Titans	**Friends**; Frasier; Everybody Loves Raymond
Favorite TV Drama	Favorite Motion Picture Actress
**ER**; The West Wing; Law & Order	**Julia Roberts – Erin Brockovich**; Meg Ryan – Hanging Up; Sandra Bullock – Miss Congeniality
Favorite Actor In A Comedy Motion Picture	Favorite Male Performer In A New TV Series
**Jim Carrey – Dr. Seuss' How the Grinch Stole Christmas**; Adam Sandler – Little Nicky; Eddie Murphy – Nutty Professor II: The Klumps	**John Goodman – Normal, Ohio**; Tom Cavanagh – Ed; Michael Richards – The Michael Richards Show
Favorite New TV Dramatic Series	Favorite Motion Picture
**Dark Angel**; Boston Public; Gideon's Crossing	**The Green Mile**; The Patriot; Remember the Titans
