= List of programs broadcast by The WB =

The following is a list of programs broadcast by The WB. Some programs were carried over to The CW, a network formed through a partnership between WB parent company Time Warner and UPN corporate parent CBS Corporation, in September 2006 following the closure of The WB. Titles are listed in alphabetical order followed by the year of debut in parentheses.

Much of The WB content today can be found on streaming services such as Tubi, Hulu, Netflix, Sling, Pluto TV and The Roku Channel.

== Drama ==
- 7th Heaven (1996–2006)
- Savannah (1996–97)
- Buffy the Vampire Slayer (1997–2001) (moved to UPN)
- Charmed (1998–2006)
- Dawson's Creek (1998–2003)
- Felicity (1998–2002)
- Hyperion Bay (1998–99)
- Three (1998)
- Angel (1999–2004)
- Jack & Jill (1999–2001)
- Popular (1999–2001)
- Rescue 77 (1999)
- Roswell (1999–2001) (moved to UPN)
- Safe Harbor (1999)
- D.C. (2000)
- Gilmore Girls (2000–06)
- Young Americans (2000)
- Dead Last (2001)
- Smallville (2001–06)
- Birds of Prey (2002–03)
- Everwood (2002–06)
- Glory Days (2002)
- Black Sash (2003)
- Tarzan (2003)
- One Tree Hill (2003–06)
- Jack & Bobby (2004–05)
- The Mountain (2004–05)
- Summerland (2004–05)
- Just Legal (2005–06)
- Related (2005–06)
- Supernatural (2005–06)
- The Bedford Diaries (2006)
- Pepper Dennis (2006)

== Comedy ==
- Cleghorne! (1995)
- First Time Out (1995)
- Kirk (1995–96)
- Muscle (1995)
- The Parent 'Hood (1995–99)
- Sister, Sister (1995–99) (moved from ABC)
- Simon (1995–96)
- The Wayans Bros. (1995–99)
- Unhappily Ever After (1995–99)
- Nick Freno: Licensed Teacher (1996–98)
- Life with Roger (1996–97)
- Brotherly Love (1996–97) (moved from NBC)
- The Jamie Foxx Show (1996–2001)
- The Steve Harvey Show (1996–2002)
- The Tom Show (1997–98)
- Alright Already (1997–98)
- Smart Guy (1997–99)
- The Army Show (1998)
- You're the One (1998)
- For Your Love (1998–2002) (moved from NBC)
- Kelly Kelly (1998)
- Katie Joplin (1999)
- Movie Stars (1999–2000)
- Zoe, Duncan, Jack and Jane (1999–2000)
- Brutally Normal (2000)
- Grosse Pointe (2000)
- Hype (2000–01)
- Nikki (2000–02)
- Sabrina the Teenage Witch (2000–03) (moved from ABC)
- Men, Women & Dogs (2001)
- Off Centre (2001–02)
- Maybe It's Me (2001–02)
- Raising Dad (2001–02)
- Reba (2001–06)
- Do Over (2002)
- Family Affair (2002–03)
- Greetings from Tucson (2002–03)
- The Jamie Kennedy Experiment (2002–04)
- My Guide to Becoming a Rock Star (2002)
- What I Like About You (2002–06)
- All About the Andersons (2003–04)
- Grounded for Life (2003–05) (moved from Fox)
- Like Family (2003–04)
- Run of the House (2003–04)
- Steve Harvey's Big Time Challenge (2003–05)
- The O'Keefes (2003)
- On the Spot (2003)
- Blue Collar TV (2004–06)
- Drew Carey's Green Screen Show (2004)
- The Help (2004)
- Living with Fran (2005–06)
- Twins (2005–06)
- Modern Men (2006)

== Adult animation ==
- Invasion America (1998)
- Mission Hill (1999–2000; moved to Adult Swim)
- Baby Blues (2000; moved to Adult Swim)
- The PJs (2000–01; moved from Fox)
- The Oblongs (2001; moved to Adult Swim)

== Reality/unscripted ==
- Popstars (2001–03)
- ElimiDate Deluxe (2001, a primetime spinoff of the syndicated reality dating series ElimiDate)
- No Boundaries (March 3 until 24, 2002; moved to OLN from September 30 until May 8, 2002)
- Boarding House: North Shore (2003)
- High School Reunion (2003–05)
- The Surreal Life (2003–04; moved to VH1 from 2004-2022, revived by MTV in 2024)
- Pepsi Play for a Billion (Special that aired on September 14, 2003; moved to ABC in 2004)
- The Celebrity Look-Alike Show (Special that aired on May 16, 2003)
- Pepsi Smash (2003–04)
- B.M.O.C: Big Man on Campus (2004–05)
- Studio 7 (2004)
- The WB's Superstar USA (2004)
- Drew Carey's Green Screen Show (2004; moved to Comedy Central in 2005)
- Beauty and the Geek (2005–06; moved to The CW from 2007–08)
- The Starlet (2005)
- Survival of the Richest (2006)

== Special ==
- The WB's Outrageous Outtakes (Special that aired on May 16, 2003)
- The WB's Outrageous Halloween Outtakes (Special that aired on October 24, 2003)

== Daytime ==
- 8 Simple Rules (2006)
- ER (2006)

== Children's programming ==
- Pinky and the Brain (1995)
- Freakazoid! (1995)

== See also ==
- List of programs broadcast by The WB 100+ Station Group – for programs aired by The WB's master programming feed for smaller markets
- List of programs broadcast by Kids' WB – for programs aired as part of The WB's Saturday-morning cartoon block.
- List of programs broadcast by The CW – for programs that transitioned to The WB's successor network, The CW.
