= Pressure 1 =

- Created by: Burt Wheeler; Sharon Sussman
- Presented by: Mark Long
- Country of origin: United States
- No. of seasons: 1

Production
- Running time: 30 minutes

Original release
- Network: Fox 5
- Release: September 5, 1999 – September 2000

Pressure 1 was a game show targeted at teenagers and preteens. Hosted by Mark Long, the series aired in weekly syndication for one season, from Fall 1999 to Spring 2000, with reruns continuing until September. Produced by Wheeler-Sussman Productions and distributed by Hearst-Argyle Television, the program was taped at the studios of WCVB-TV in Boston.

The series was offered as one of two series named Pressure in an hour-long block. Its companion series, Pressure 2, was actually heavily edited reruns of the 1997-98 game show Peer Pressure.

== Gameplay ==
Unlike its parent show, Pressure 1 was based on general trivia. The only similarities between the two were the shared logo and theme song. At the end of each round, a clip was shown of the eliminated player telling the viewers their most embarrassing moment, referred to as the "Wall of Shame".

=== Round 1 (Four's a Crowd) ===
The four contestants competed in answering questions, with the round ending after three of the four players had each correctly answered two questions; the remaining player was eliminated (hence the round's name).

=== Round 2 (Take That!) ===
The remaining three players competed in another round of questions sitting in chairs (one red, one orange, and one blue), which began with the first player to win a spot in that round choosing one of two possible categories to answer a question in, then giving the remaining category to his/her opponents for them to buzz in and answer. The player that answered correctly would then be given a choice of two categories to play, with the other two players trying their luck at the remaining category, and so on for the remainder of the round. Correct answers were worth 10 points each, and when time expired, the lowest-scoring contestant was eliminated.

=== Round 3 (Pressure Cooker) ===
After the end of general play, the two finalists would face off in a "lightning round" in which they had to answer five questions in 60 seconds. Whoever answered them in the fastest time, or whoever answered the most questions correctly, won the game and a prize package. Both players received the same questions; the contestant playing second was sequestered in an isolation booth so that he could not hear the questions or answers.
