= Peer Pressure (game show) =

American television game show

- Created by: Burt Wheeler, Sharon Sussman
- Directed by: Joe Carolei
- Presented by: Nick Spano; Valarie Rae Miller
- Country of origin: United States
- No. of seasons: 1

Production
- Producers: Gary Ponticello, Lynne Spiegel Spillman
- Running time: approx. 22-26 minutes
- Production company: Wheeler-Sussman Productions

Original release
- Network: Syndication
- Release: September 9, 1997 – September 1998

Peer Pressure is an American television game show. Youth contestants perform stunts and answer questions about moral dilemmas. The show aired in syndication from 1997-1998 in first-run, and was hosted by Nick Spano and Valarie Rae Miller.

== Gameplay ==
Three youths, ages 12–17, compete in a game based around moral dilemmas and stunts. They compete on a set resembling an oversized board game, and attempt to progress furthest on the game board. One at a time, each contestant determines moves via a Magic 8 Ball, which reveals a type of activity (a stunt or a moral-based question) and the number of spaces the contestant can move upon a correct answer or completion of said stunt. The board also features "go ahead" and "move back" spaces.

=== Activities ===
Four different activities are possible:

- Decision – The contestant and a "Peer Group" (a jury composed of about 10-12 teenagers in the studio audience) are read a moral dilemma-type question (e.g., "She's a really pretty, petite young blonde, but often wears plain white T-shirts and blue jeans to school because that's what she likes to wear. Does she turn you off because she dresses like a tomboy?") The contestant, without knowing how the Peer Group voted, supplies an answer, and progresses if their answer matches the group's consensus.
- Odd Job – The player performs a stunt (such as sorting clothing by type into the appropriate laundry basket), and has to meet the goal in a time limit to move.
- Temptation – A prize is described. The contestant can take the prize and accept a two-step penalty, or pass it up and advance. If the contestant takes the prize, it is theirs to keep regardless of the outcome of the game.
- Fast Track – Similar to "Odd Job", except the stunt is more difficult and always worth eight steps (e.g., preparing three banana split sundaes on a moving conveyor belt within a time limit). Failing to complete the task awards a two-step move as consolation.

After each contestant has taken a turn, the host asks a "Pop Quiz" question. Correct answers allow that player to advance three spaces, while a wrong answer (or failing to answer) offers a three-step penalty. Gameplay continues until time expires.

In the final segment of the game, the two higher-scoring contestants of three compete in the "Pressure Cooker" round. The goal is to correctly guess the outcome of yes-or-no questions asked of the in-studio peer group. The first contestant to correctly guess three times wins a prize package.

== Production ==
Peer Pressure was hosted by Nick Spano and Valarie Rae Miller. It was created and distributed by Wheeler-Sussman Productions, also the creators of Singled Out. The show recorded at the Production Group Studios in Hollywood, Los Angeles.

While no further episodes were produced after early 1998, reruns would continue for the 1998-99 season, with onscreen Pop-Up Video-style graphics added to highlight certain moments during the episodes, and the "Magic 8 Ball" was replaced by generic category graphics. For the 1999-2000 season, the reruns were paired with new entry Pressure 1, now airing under the title Pressure 2, with all mentions of the word "peer" edited or muted from the episodes.
