= TWF2 =

Protein-coding gene in the species Homo sapiens

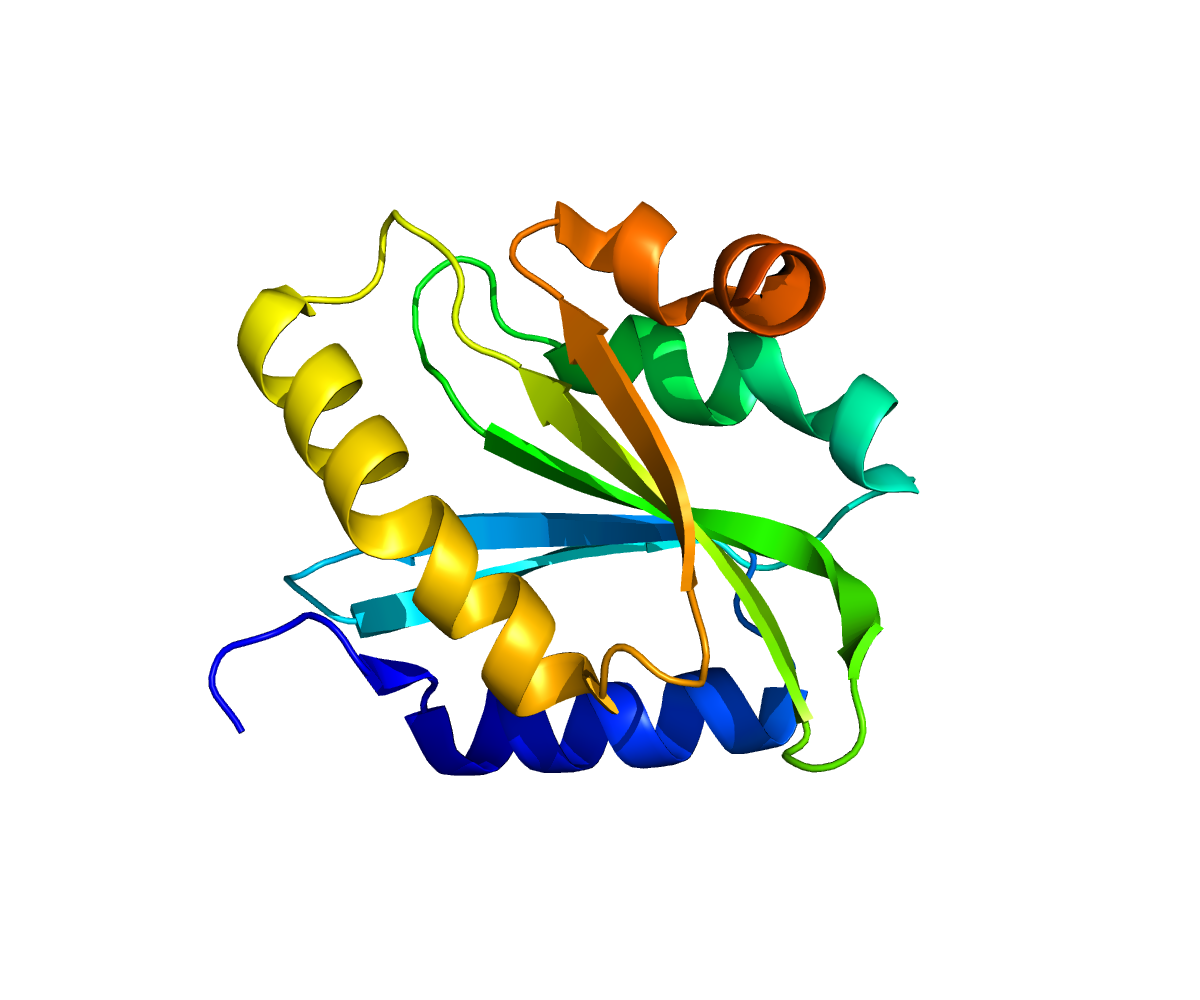
Available structures
PDB	Ortholog search: PDBe RCSB
PDB	List of PDB id codes 2VAC, 2W0I

Identifiers
- Aliases: TWF2, A6RP, A6r, PTK9L, MSTP011, twinfilin actin binding protein 2
- External IDs: OMIM: 607433; MGI: 1346078; HomoloGene: 5272; GeneCards: TWF2; OMA:TWF2 - orthologs

Gene location (Human)
Chr.	Chromosome 3 (human)
Band	3p21.2	Start	52,228,612 bp
Band	3p21.2	End	52,246,788 bp

Gene location (Mouse)
Chr.	Chromosome 9 (mouse)
Band	9|9 F1	Start	106,080,307 bp
Band	9|9 F1	End	106,092,588 bp
RNA expression pattern
Bgee	Human / Mouse (ortholog); Top expressed in: apex of heart; muscle of thigh; granulocyte; gastrocnemius muscle; monocyte; glutes; left ventricle; triceps brachii muscle; blood; mucosa of transverse colon / Top expressed in: intercostal muscle; granulocyte; soleus muscle; vestibular sensory epithelium; interventricular septum; thoracic diaphragm; medial head of gastrocnemius muscle; masseter muscle; muscle of thigh; digastric muscle; More reference expression data
BioGPS	n/a
Gene ontology
Molecular function	actin monomer binding; protein binding; actin binding; phosphatidylinositol-4,5-bisphosphate binding; ATP binding; protein kinase C binding; RNA binding; cadherin binding; actin filament binding
Cellular component	cell projection; filopodium; growth cone; intracellular anatomical structure; stereocilium; perinuclear region of cytoplasm; extracellular exosome; cytoskeleton; lamellipodium; cytoplasm; myofibril; actin filament
Biological process	cellular response to retinoic acid; regulation of actin cytoskeleton organization; negative regulation of actin filament polymerization; cellular response to growth factor stimulus; cell projection organization; positive regulation of neuron projection development; positive regulation of axon extension; positive regulation of lamellipodium assembly; regulation of microvillus length; sequestering of actin monomers; barbed-end actin filament capping; regulation of lamellipodium assembly; actin filament depolymerization
Sources:Amigo / QuickGO
Orthologs
Species	Human	Mouse
Entrez	11344	23999
Ensembl	ENSG00000247596	ENSMUSG00000023277
UniProt	Q6IBS0	Q9Z0P5
RefSeq (mRNA)	NM_007284	NM_011876
RefSeq (protein)	NP_009215	NP_036006
Location (UCSC)	Chr 3: 52.23 – 52.25 Mb	Chr 9: 106.08 – 106.09 Mb
PubMed search
- Wikidata
View/Edit Human	View/Edit Mouse

Twinfilin-2 is a protein that in humans is encoded by the TWF2 gene.

The protein encoded by this gene was identified by its interaction with the catalytic domain of protein kinase C-zeta. The encoded protein contains an actin-binding site and an ATP-binding site. It is most closely related to twinfilin (PTK9), a conserved actin monomer-binding protein.
