= Every Woman =

- Created by: Byron Allen
- Country of origin: United States
- Original language: English

Production
- Executive producers: Byron Allen; Carolyn Folks
- Running time: Approx. 20 minutes
- Production company: Entertainment Studios

Original release
- Network: First-run syndication
- Release: October 20, 2007 – October 6, 2012

Every Woman is a syndicated television series produced by Entertainment Studios and created by Byron Allen. Heidi Klum made a guest appearance on the show in 2011.
