= Things I've Seen =

2000 single by Spooks

Single by Spooks

from the album S.I.O.S.O.S. Volume One
- B-side: "Young Thugs-Ballad of Youth" (snippet); 1. "Yes Yes Y'all" (snippet)
- Released: February 29, 2000
- Studio: The Rug Room
- Length: 4:34
- Label: Antra; Epic
- Songwriters: Booker T. Tucker; Joseph M. Davis; Chenjurai Kumayika; Jerel Spruill; Irina M. Perez; Rick Dahrouge
- Producer: Rick Dahrouge

Spooks singles chronology
"Sweet Revenge" (2000)	"Things I've Seen" (2000)	"Karma Hotel" (2001)

Audio
- "Things I've Seen" on YouTube

"Things I've Seen" is a song by American hip hop group Spooks from their first studio album, S.I.O.S.O.S. Volume One (2000). The song was written by Spooks and Rick Dahrouge, who also produced the track, and was released as the second single from S.I.O.S.O.S. Volume One in the United States; in Europe, it was Spooks' debut single. The European maxi-CD single includes two snippets from songs by Roscoe (brother of Kurupt) and Schoolly D.

Antra Records released "Things I've Seen" in the US on February 29, 2000, but the song did not make a major impact. In Europe, the song became a hit across the continent after receiving substantial airplay in France, reaching the top 10 in eight countries, including France and the United Kingdom. Music critics gave the song mixed reviews, praising Ming-Xia's vocal performance but criticizing the instrumental track. American actor Laurence Fishburne appears in the song's music video.

== Critical reception ==
British trade paper Music Week called the track "infectious" and noted its similarities to works by Fugees. Cristian Ward of British website NME criticized the song's instrumental, describing it as "uninspired", but praised Ming-Xia's "beautiful" and "fragile" vocals. Reviewing the album on AllMusic, Steve Kurutz also complimented Ming-Xia's vocals while mentioning that the song "take[s] on too much and suffers for it."

== Release and chart performance ==
"Things I've Seen" was sent to US rhythmic contemporary radio stations on February 29, 2000, but did not make an impact, and the band soon faded into obscurity. According to Spooks member Booka T., the commercial failure of the song was because their music sounded too "original" and "cerebral" for Americans. In Europe, where "Things I've Seen" was released as the group's debut single, the song was immediately picked up by French radio stations, particularly Fun Radio. The song eventually peaked at number four on the French Singles Chart for two weeks, spending 22 weeks in the top 100 and selling 400,000 copies by January 2001. In the wake of its French success, "Things I've Seen" was gradually issued across Europe. It first charted in Germany and Switzerland in November 2000, reaching number 24 in the former country and number 10 in the latter. In Benelux, the single reached the top 10 in both the Netherlands and Belgium (Flanders and Wallonia).

Throughout the first quarter of 2001, "Things I've Seen" charted in several more countries. On January 21, 2001, the song debuted and peaked at number six on the UK Singles Chart, staying on the listing for 10 weeks, while in Ireland, it reached number 21 on February 1. The song reached number four in Austria the following month. In Scandinavia, the track entered the top 10 in Denmark and Sweden and peaked outside the top 10 in Norway, reaching number 11. Elsewhere in Europe, the song peaked at number 12 in Finland and number 28 in Italy. Overall, the song was Europe's 32nd-most-successful hit of 2001, reaching number five on the Eurochart Hot 100. The record also charted within the top 40 in New Zealand, where it climbed to number 16 on the RIANZ Singles Chart in May 2001.

== Track listings ==
US and European CD single

1. "Things I've Seen" (radio edit)
2. "Things I've Seen" (KB Weal's Krude club mix)

UK CD single

1. "Things I've Seen" (radio edit) – 3:59
2. "Things I've Seen" (international radio edit) – 3:21
3. "Things I've Seen" (KB Weal's Krude club mix) – 4:35
4. "Things I've Seen" (Philip Steir's Spooktacular Bomb Mix) – 5:19

UK cassette single

1. "Things I've Seen" (radio edit) – 3:59
2. "Things I've Seen" (international radio edit) – 3:21

French CD single

1. "Things I've Seen" (French edit) – 3:21
2. "Things I've Seen" (album version) – 4:34
3. "Things I've Seen" (KB Weal's Krude club mix) – 4:35

European maxi-CD single

1. "Things I've Seen" (radio edit) – 3:59
2. "Things I've Seen" (Aural clean mix) – 4:33
3. "Things I've Seen" (KB Weal's Krude club mix) – 4:35
4. "Young Thugs-Ballad of Youth" by Roscoe featuring Richie Sambora (snippet) – 0:32
5. "Yes Yes Y'all" by Schoolly D (snippet) – 0:39

Australian CD single

1. "Things I've Seen" (international radio edit) – 3:21
2. "Things I've Seen" (radio edit) – 3:59
3. "Things I've Seen" (KB Weal's Krude club mix) – 4:35
4. "Things I've Seen" (Philip Steir's Spooktacular Bomb Mix) – 5:19

== Credits and personnel ==
Credits are taken from the European maxi-CD single liner notes.

Studios

- Recorded at The Rug Room
- Pre-production recorded at Outback Recording (Neptune, New Jersey)
- Mixed at Sigma Sound Studios (Philadelphia, Pennsylvania)

Personnel

- Booker T. Tucker – writing
- Joseph M. Davis – writing
- Chenjurai Kumayika – writing
- Jerel Spruill – writing
- Irina M. Perez – writing
- Rick Dahrouge – writing, guitar, bass, keyboards, production
- J "Rock" Kulikowski – drums
- Daryl "D Man" Dahrouge – programming, engineering
- Cheek – chief and mix engineering
- Greg Frentzen – assistant engineering

== Charts ==
=== Weekly charts ===
Chart (2000–2001)	Peak position
Austria (Ö3 Austria Top 40)	4
Belgium (Ultratop 50 Flanders)	6
Belgium (Ultratop 50 Wallonia)	7
Denmark (Tracklisten)	10
Europe (Eurochart Hot 100)	5
Finland (Suomen virallinen lista)	12
France (SNEP)	4
Germany (GfK)	24
Ireland (IRMA)	21
Italy (FIMI)	28
Netherlands (Dutch Top 40)	7
Netherlands (Single Top 100)	10
New Zealand (Recorded Music NZ)	16
Norway (VG-lista)	11
Scotland Singles (OCC)	13
Sweden (Sverigetopplistan)	8
Switzerland (Schweizer Hitparade)	10
UK Singles (OCC)	6
UK Hip Hop/R&B (OCC)	2
US Hot R&B/Hip-Hop Singles & Tracks (Billboard)	94
US Hot Rap Singles (Billboard)	13

=== Year-end charts ===
Chart (2000)	Position
France (SNEP)	25

Chart (2001)	Position
Austria (Ö3 Austria Top 40)	35
Belgium (Ultratop 50 Flanders)	39
Belgium (Ultratop 50 Wallonia)	65
Europe (Eurochart Hot 100)	32
Netherlands (Dutch Top 40)	19
Netherlands (Single Top 100)	87
Sweden (Hitlistan)	57
Switzerland (Schweizer Hitparade)	56
UK Singles (OCC)	103

== Certifications ==
Region	Certification	Certified units/sales
Belgium (BRMA)	Gold	25,000^{*}
France (SNEP)	Gold	400,000
Sweden (GLF)	Gold	15,000^{^}
^{*} Sales figures based on certification alone.^{^} Shipments figures based on certification alone.

== Release history ==
Region	Date	Format(s)	Label(s)	Ref.
United States	February 29, 2000	Rhythmic contemporary radio	Antra	
United States	March 28, 2000	CD	Antra	
United Kingdom	January 15, 2001	CD; cassette	Antra; Epic	
Australia	March 19, 2001	CD	Antra	
