= TWF1 =

Protein-coding gene in the species Homo sapiens

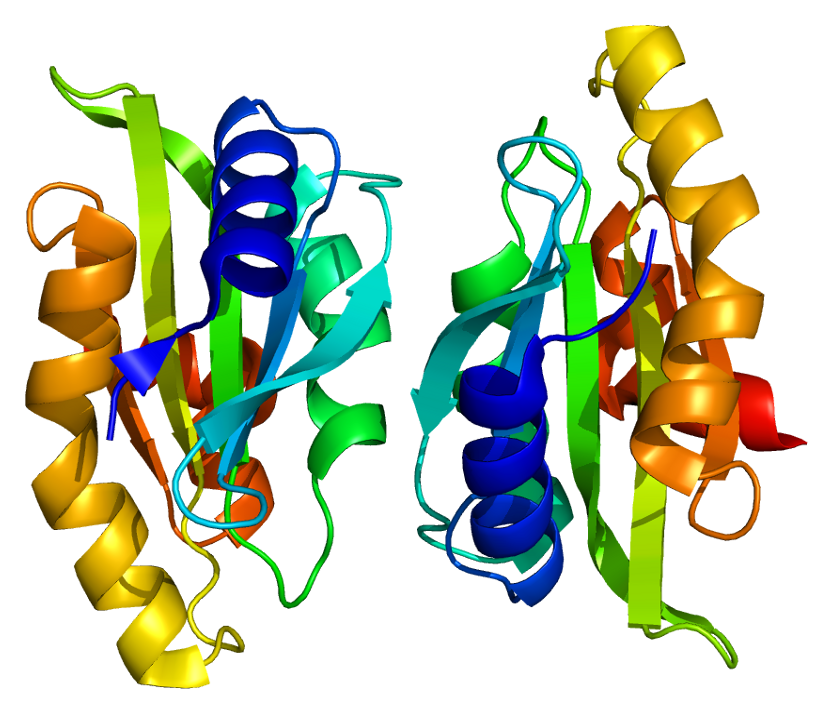

Identifiers
- Aliases: TWF1, A6, PTK9, twinfilin actin binding protein 1
- External IDs: OMIM: 610932; MGI: 1100520; HomoloGene: 48140; GeneCards: TWF1; OMA:TWF1 - orthologs

Gene location (Human)
Chr.	Chromosome 12 (human)
Band	12q12	Start	43,793,723 bp
Band	12q12	End	43,806,328 bp

Gene location (Mouse)
Chr.	Chromosome 15 (mouse)
Band	15|15 E3	Start	94,475,832 bp
Band	15|15 E3	End	94,487,770 bp
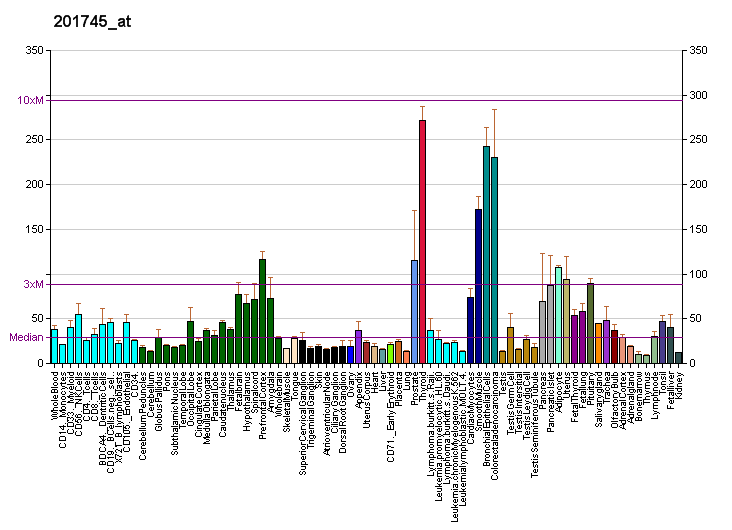

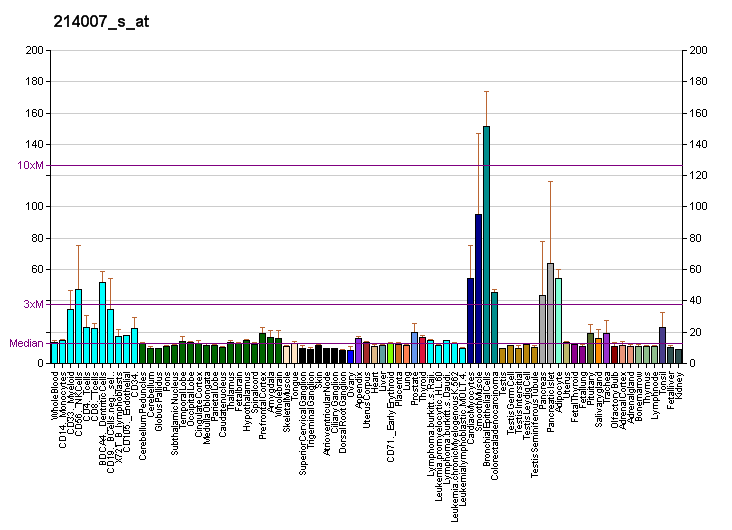
RNA expression pattern
Bgee	Human / Mouse (ortholog); Top expressed in: secondary oocyte; palpebral conjunctiva; seminal vesicula; gingival epithelium; epithelium of nasopharynx; Achilles tendon; oral cavity; jejunal mucosa; islet of Langerhans; rectum / Top expressed in: utricle; vestibular sensory epithelium; stroma of bone marrow; endothelial cell of lymphatic vessel; Paneth cell; vestibular membrane of cochlear duct; transitional epithelium of urinary bladder; cumulus cell; olfactory epithelium; ileum; More reference expression data
BioGPS	More reference expression data
Gene ontology
Molecular function	protein-containing complex binding; protein tyrosine kinase activity; ATP binding; actin monomer binding; phosphatidylinositol-4,5-bisphosphate binding; cadherin binding; actin binding; protein binding; actin filament binding
Cellular component	intracellular anatomical structure; cytoskeleton; focal adhesion; filopodium; actin cytoskeleton; cell-cell junction; perinuclear region of cytoplasm; myofibril; ruffle membrane; cytoplasm; cytosol; actin filament
Biological process	regulation of actin phosphorylation; barbed-end actin filament capping; sequestering of actin monomers; negative regulation of actin filament polymerization; positive regulation of cardiac muscle hypertrophy; regulation of lamellipodium assembly; positive regulation of neuron projection development; peptidyl-tyrosine phosphorylation; actin filament depolymerization
Sources:Amigo / QuickGO
Orthologs
Species	Human	Mouse
Entrez	5756	19230
Ensembl	ENSG00000151239	ENSMUSG00000022451
UniProt	Q12792	Q91YR1
RefSeq (mRNA)	NM_001242397; NM_002822; NM_198974	NM_008971
RefSeq (protein)	NP_001229326; NP_002813	NP_032997; NP_001389738; NP_001389739
Location (UCSC)	Chr 12: 43.79 – 43.81 Mb	Chr 15: 94.48 – 94.49 Mb
PubMed search
- Wikidata
View/Edit Human	View/Edit Mouse

Twinfilin-1 is a protein that in humans is encoded by the TWF1 gene. This gene encodes twinfilin, an actin monomer-binding protein conserved from yeast to mammals. Studies of the mouse counterpart suggest that this protein may be an actin monomer-binding protein, and its localization to cortical G-actin-rich structures may be regulated by the small GTPase RAC1.
