= List of programs broadcast by Kids' WB =

This is a list of television shows formerly broadcast on the Kids' WB programming block in the United States. The block launched on September 9, 1995, on The WB and continued after the 2006 United States broadcast TV realignment on The CW until it aired for the final time on May 17, 2008. Kids' WB would be succeeded by The CW4Kids.

Much of the Kids' WB content today can be found on streaming services such as HBO Max and Tubi.

== Programming ==
=== Original programming ===
Title	First date	Last aired	Source(s)
Animaniacs (Note: Originally aired on Fox (Fox Kids))	September 9, 1995	February 22, 2000	
The Sylvester & Tweety Mysteries	September 9, 1995	February 22, 2001 (Note: Final episode only on Cartoon Network)	
Freakazoid!	September 9, 1995	June 1, 1997	
Pinky and the Brain	September 9, 1995	July 15, 2000	
That's Warner Bros.!	September 11, 1995	September 6, 1996	
Superman: The Animated Series	September 7, 1996	February 12, 2000	
Road Rovers	September 7, 1996	September 6, 1997	
Bugs 'n' Daffy	September 9, 1996	September 11, 1998	
Waynehead	October 19, 1996	September 6, 1997	
The Daffy Duck Show	November 23, 1996	August 30, 1997	
The New Batman Adventures	September 13, 1997	January 16, 1999	
The New Batman/Superman Adventures	September 13, 1997	August 31, 2000	
Histeria!^{E/I}	September 14, 1998	August 30, 2001	
Pinky, Elmyra & the Brain	September 19, 1998	January 9, 1999	
Batman Beyond	January 16, 1999	September 14, 2001	
The Big Cartoonie Show	January 16, 1999	August 31, 2000	
Detention^{E/I}	September 11, 1999	August 31, 2001	
Static Shock	September 23, 2000	July 13, 2004	
The Zeta Project	January 27, 2001	August 10, 2002	
The Nightmare Room^{Live-Action}	August 31, 2001	March 16, 2002	
¡Mucha Lucha!	August 17, 2002	May 28, 2005	
Baby Looney Tunes^{E/I}	September 6, 2002	April 14, 2003 (Note: Season 1 aired on selected WB-affiliated stations; season 2 was produced for Cartoon Network)	
What's New, Scooby-Doo?	September 14, 2002	April 16, 2005	
Ozzy & Drix	September 14, 2002	July 30, 2004	
Xiaolin Showdown	November 1, 2003	September 15, 2007	
The Batman †	September 11, 2004	March 8, 2008 (Note: Some episodes aired on Cartoon Network)	
Coconut Fred's Fruit Salad Island!	September 17, 2005	July 1, 2006	
Loonatics Unleashed	September 17, 2005	September 15, 2007	
Johnny Test †	September 17, 2005	May 17, 2008 (Note: Moved to Cartoon Network)	
Tom and Jerry Tales †	September 23, 2006	May 17, 2008	
Shaggy & Scooby-Doo Get a Clue!	September 23, 2006	March 22, 2008	
Legion of Super Heroes	September 23, 2006	April 5, 2008	

=== Programming from Warner Bros. Television ===
Title	First date	Last aired	Source(s)
Samurai Jack	September 1, 2001		
The Powerpuff Girls	May 25, 2002	July 13, 2002	
Codename: Kids Next Door	May 15, 2004	July 10, 2004	
Foster's Home for Imaginary Friends	July 9, 2005	August 27, 2005	
Tiny Toon Adventures	September 1, 1997	August 29, 2000	
Teen Titans	November 1, 2003	April 16, 2005	
Teen Titans	December 1, 2007	March 1, 2008	
Captain Planet and the Planeteers^{E/I}	September 1, 1997	September 11, 1998	
Scooby-Doo, Where Are You!	January 12, 2002	January 2, 2004	
The New Scooby-Doo Movies	2002	2003	
The Scooby-Doo Show	2002	2003	
Scooby-Doo and Scrappy-Doo	2002	2003	
The New Scooby and Scrappy-Doo Show	2002	2003	
Krypto the Superdog^{E/I}	September 23, 2006	September 15, 2007	

=== Acquired programming ===
==== Anime ====
Title	First date	Last aired	Source(s)
Pokémon	February 13, 1999	September 16, 2006	
Yu-Gi-Oh! † ‡	September 29, 2001	September 2, 2006	
Cardcaptors	June 17, 2000	December 14, 2001	
Dragon Ball Z	July 30, 2001	2001	
Sailor Moon	September 3, 2001	2001	
MegaMan NT Warrior	May 17, 2003	July 22, 2005	
Astro Boy	January 17, 2004	April 30, 2004	
Transformers: Cybertron	September 19, 2005	December 30, 2005	
Viewtiful Joe	November 5, 2005	August 26, 2006	
Spider Riders	June 17, 2006	March 31, 2007	

==== Miscellaneous ====
Title	First date	Last aired	Source(s)
Earthworm Jim (Note: Kids' WB is named in the credits but did not directly produce the show.)	September 9, 1995	December 13, 1996	
The Legend of Calamity Jane	September 13, 1997	September 27, 1997	
Men in Black: The Series	October 11, 1997	August 31, 2001	
Channel Umptee-3	October 20, 1997	September 4, 1998	
Invasion America	June 8, 1998	July 7, 1998	
Brats of the Lost Nebula	October 10, 1998	October 24, 1998	
Max Steel	February 26, 2000	August 31, 2001	
Generation O!	August 26, 2000	August 31, 2001	
Jackie Chan Adventures	September 9, 2000	September 16, 2005	
X-Men: Evolution	November 4, 2000	November 15, 2003	
Rescue Heroes^{E/I} ‡	July 21, 2001	August 29, 2003	
Cubix: Robots for Everyone^{E/I} † ‡	August 11, 2001	May 10, 2003	
The Mummy: The Animated Series	September 29, 2001	July 26, 2003	
Phantom Investigators	May 25, 2002	June 29, 2002	
Da Boom Crew	September 11, 2004	October 16, 2004	
Monster Allergy	September 23, 2006	March 31, 2007	
Will and Dewitt^{E/I} †	September 22, 2007	May 17, 2008	
Magi-Nation^{E/I} †	September 22, 2007	May 17, 2008	
Eon Kid †	September 22, 2007	May 17, 2008	
Skunk Fu! †	September 22, 2007	May 17, 2008	
The Spectacular Spider-Man † ‡	March 8, 2008	May 17, 2008	
World of Quest †	March 15, 2008	May 17, 2008	

=== Short-form programming ===
Title	First date	Last aired	Source(s)
Thumb Wrestling Federation	2007	2008	

† - Program transitioned to The CW4Kids/Toonzai
‡ - Program transitioned to Vortexx

=== Films ===
Title	Initial broadcast date	Source(s)
Wakko's Wish	February 21, 2000	
Grandma Got Run Over by a Reindeer	December 23, 2002	
Zolar	May 29, 2004	
Pokémon: Destiny Deoxys	January 22, 2005	
Pokémon: The Mastermind of Mirage Pokémon	April 29, 2006	

== See also ==
- List of programs broadcast by The WB
- List of programs broadcast by UPN
- List of programs broadcast by The CW
